= List of Pakistani cattle breeds =

This is a list of the cattle breeds considered in Pakistan to be wholly or partly of Pakistani origin. Some may have complex or obscure histories, so inclusion here does not necessarily imply that a breed is predominantly or exclusively Pakistani.

Local name	Other names	Notes	Image
Achai^{[2]}^{[4]}			
Bhagnari^{[1]}^{[2]}	Nari^{[4]}		
Cholistani^{[1]}^{[2]}^{[4]}			
Dajal^{[1]}^{[2]}^{[4]}			
Dhanni^{[1]}^{[2]}	Pothwari^{[4]}		
Gabrali^{[2]}^{[4]}			
Hariana^{[4]}			
Hissar^{[4]}			
Kankaraj^{[1]}^{[2]}^{[4]}			
Lohani^{[1]}^{[2]}^{[4]}			
Red Sindhi^{[1]}^{[2]}	Malir; Sindhi^{[4]}		
Rojhan^{[1]}^{[2]}^{[4]}			
Sahiwal^{[1]}^{[2]}	Lola; Montgomery^{[4]}		
Thari^{[1]}^{[2]}^{[4]}	Tharparkar; GreySindhi^{[4]}		
