= Lehri =

== People ==
- Lehri (tribe), a Baloch tribe of the Balochistan province of Pakistan
- Lehri (actor) (1929–2012), Pakistani film actor
- Sudesh Lehri (born 1968), Indian actor and comedian
- Sunil Lahri (born 1961), Indian actor

== Places ==
- Lehri, Balochistan, a town and union council in the Sibi District in the Balochistan province of Pakistan
  - Lehri District
- Lehri, Morocco a commune of the Khenifra Province
- Lehri, Jhelum, a village and union council in the Jhelum District in the Punjab province of Pakistan

== See also ==
- Lahari (disambiguation)
- Lahar (disambiguation)
- Battle of El Herri, or Lehri, a 1914 military conflict between Zayan tribes and French invading forces
