= Dajal cattle =

Pakistani breed of cattle

Dajal
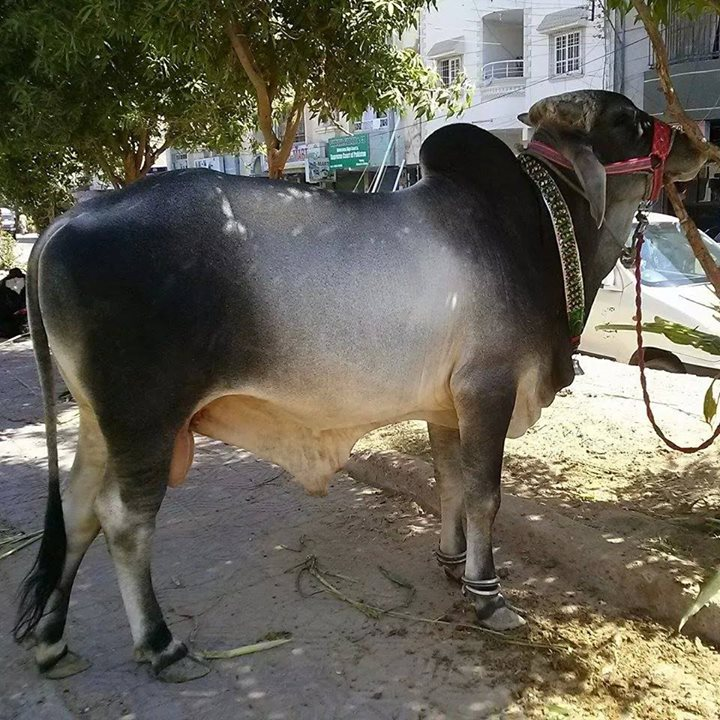
- Conservation status: FAO (2007): not at risk; DAD-IS (2023): unknown
- Other names: Dajjal; Kachhi; Nari
- Country of origin: Pakistan
- Use: draught; meat

Traits
- Weight: Male: 587 kg; Female: 400 kg
- Height: Male: 147 cm; Female: 138 cm
- Cattle; Bos (primigenius) indicus

The Dajal or Dajjal is a Pakistani breed of large zebuine draught cattle. It originates in Dera Ghazi Khan District of Punjab Province in central-eastern Pakistan, and is named for the town of Dajal in that district. It derives from the Bhagnari, but is not as large.

== History ==
From the middle of the nineteenth century, cattle of the Bhagnari breed were used to improve the local cattle of Dera Ghazi Khan district of Punjab, leading to the creation of the Dajal breed, which is similar to the Bhagnari, but is not so large. In the early twentieth century it was the only draught breed of any significance in the western Punjab Province. In the 1940s there were over a million head of the Dajal, considerably more than there were Bhagnari; by 1986 that number had dropped to below 72000.

The Dajal, like the Cholistani, was not included in the 1996 census of cattle in Pakistan, apparently because there were at that time no purebred examples in any government breeding station. In 2007 its conservation status was listed by the FAO as 'not at risk'. No population data has been reported to DAD-IS since 1986, and in 2023 its conservation status was shown as 'unknown'.

== Characteristics ==
The Dajal is morphologically similar to the Bhagnari from which it derives, but is not so large. Genetically it is closest to the Rojhan, which has a similar area of distribution.

== Use ==
The Dajal is a draught breed. The annual milk yield is variously reported to be approximately 750 kg or 900 kg in a lactation of 257 days, or 1000 kg in a lactation of undefined length; a statistical study published in 2022 found a median yield of 826 kg and median lactation length of 203 days.

Cross-breeding with Charolais stock produces a fast-growing beef calf.
