= Jalsa =

Jalsa may refer to:

- Jalsa (2008 film), an Indian Telugu-language film
- Jalsa (2016 film), an Indian Marathi-language film
- Jalsa (2022 film), an Indian Hindi-language film
- Jalsa (traditional sport), a bull racing sport in Punjab, Pakistan
- Jalsa Bungalow, in Mumbai, India; residence of actor Amitabh Bachchan and the Bachchan family
- Jalsa Salana, an annual Ahmadi gathering
