= Sar-I-Bolan railway station =

Railway station in Pakistan

Coordinates: 29.9009°N 67.2772°E

General information
- Owner: Ministry of Railways

Other information
- Station code: SBN
Location
- Location within Balochistan, Pakistan Location within Pakistan

Sar-I-Bolan railway station (Urdu: سر بولان ریلوے اسٹیشن) is a railway station located in the Kacchi district of Pakistan.

== See also ==
- List of railway stations in Pakistan
- Pakistan Railways
