= Jalal Khan (disambiguation) =

Jalal Khan refers to:

- Jalal Khan, a legendary figure in the history of Balochistan
- Jalal Khan (Bahmani rebel), who rebelled against the Bahmani Sultanate and established a shortlived state at Nalgonda
- Jalal Khan Orakzai, Afghan hero who saved the lives of thousands of Muslims of India
- Jalal Khan, Balochistan, a town in Pakistan
- Jalal Khan (athlete) (born 1927), a Pakistani javelin thrower
- Ahmad Shah II (r. 1451–1458), born Jalal Khan, ruler of the Gujarat Sultanate in India
- Diler Khan, born Jalal Khan, Afghan general of Aurangzeb and Mughal governor of Awadh
- Jalal Khan (politician), Pakistani politician
- Jamali Kamboh, also Jalal Khan, 16th-century Indian Sufi saint and poet
