= Miniature Zebu =

American breed of cattle

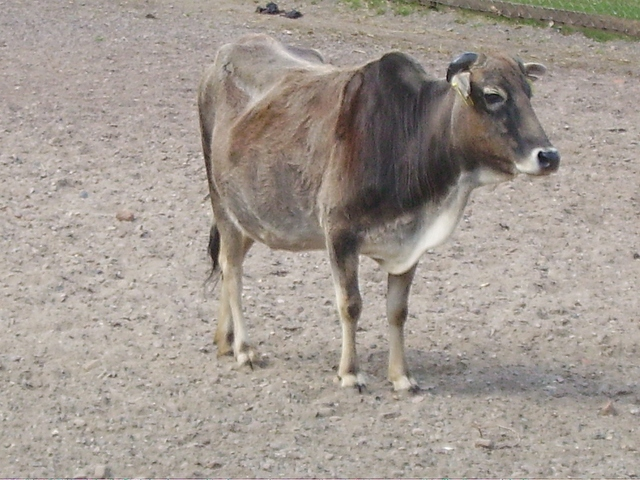
- Conservation status: FAO (2007): not listed; DAD-IS (2025): not reported
- Country of origin: United States

Traits
- Weight: Male: 182–272 kg; Female: 136–227 kg
- Height: maximum 107 cm (42 in)

The Miniature Zebu is a modern American breed of zebuine miniature cattle. A breed association was established in 1991.

== History ==
India has numerous traditional breeds of very small zebuine cattle, such as the Vechur breed of southern Kerala. These may be collectively known as nadudana, "small cattle".

The Miniature Zebu was established as a breed in the United States in 1991, when a herd-book was started by the International Miniature Zebu Association, a breed association. At that time, there were small zebuine cattle in twenty-three American zoos, and others were held by some fifty private owners. The parent stock had originally been imported from Brazil, the Dominican Republic and Sweden. By 2016 more than 6200 animals were registered.

The Miniature Zebu is not reported by the United States Department of Agriculture to the DAD-IS database of the Food and Agriculture Organization of the United Nations. It was not included in the list of farm animal genetic resources published in 2007 by that organisation as an annex to its report on The State of the World's Animal Genetic Resources for Food and Agriculture.

== Characteristics ==
The maximum withers height permitted for registration by the association is 107 cm (42 in).
