= Miniature horse =

Very small horse

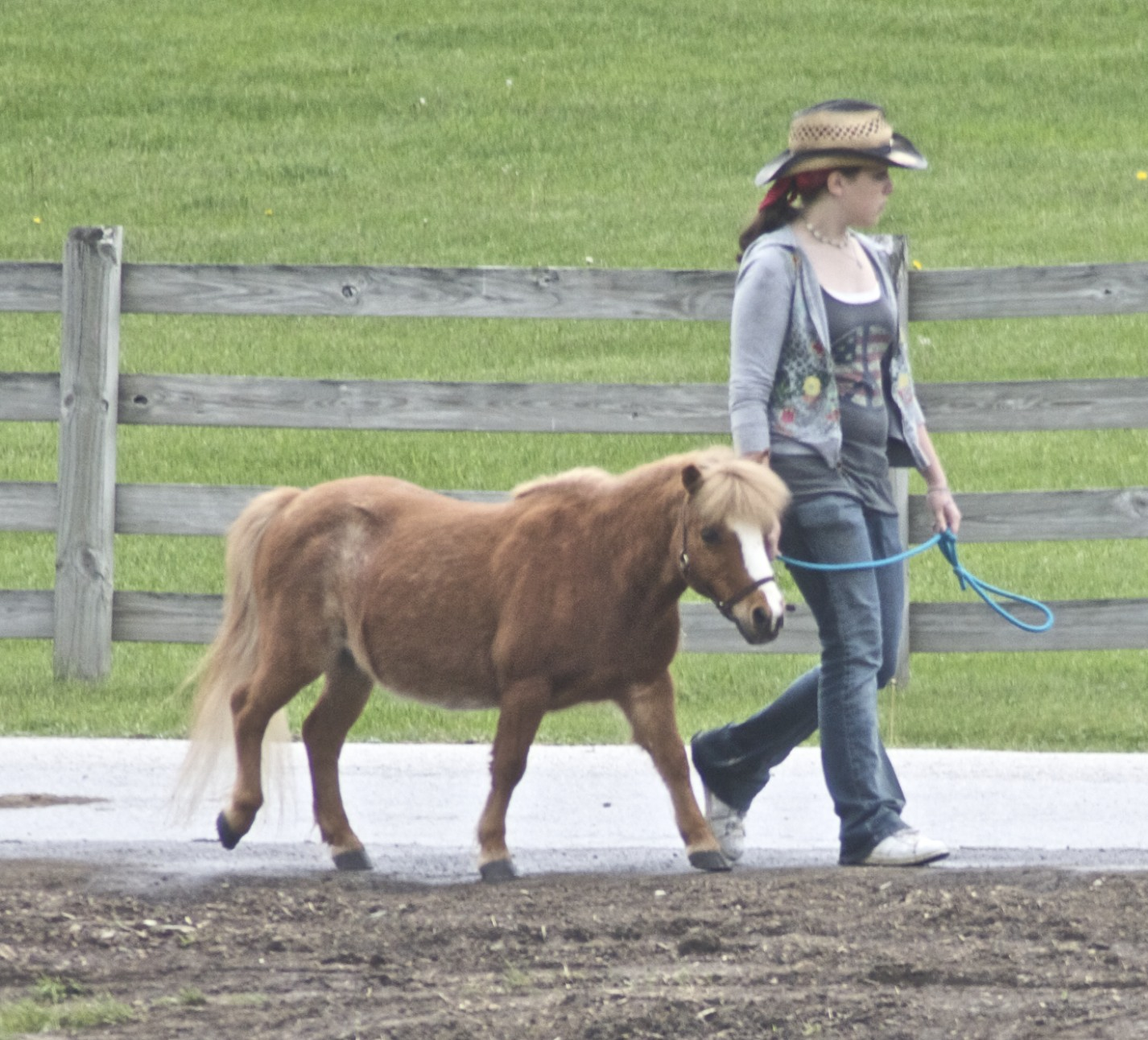
Miniature Horse

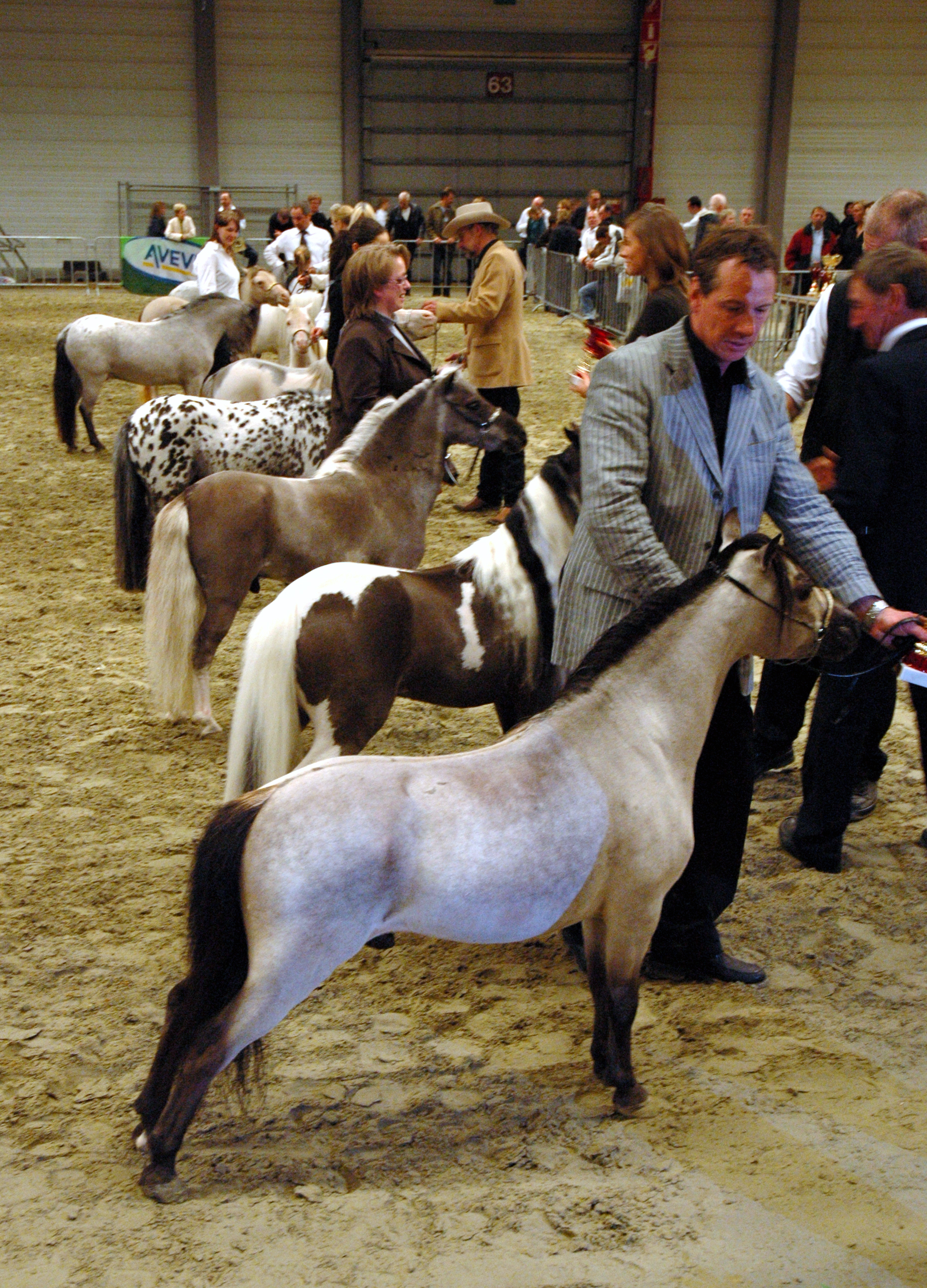
Miniature horses being shown

A miniature horse is a type of horse characterised by its small size. Usually it has been bred to display in miniature the physical characteristics of a full-sized horse, but to be little over 100 cm (40 in) in height, or even less. Although such horses have the appearance of small horses, they are genetically much more similar to pony breeds, such as the Shetland. They have various colors and coat patterns.

Miniature horses are present in several countries, including Argentina, Australia, France, Germany, the Netherlands, Ireland, Namibia, the Philippines, the United Kingdom and the United States. In some countries they have the status of a breed such as the Falabella of Argentina, the Dutch Miniature or Nederlands Mini Paard, the South African Miniature Horse and the American Miniature Horse.

They are commonly kept as companion animals, or for activities such as driving or other competitive horse show events. A few have been trained as guide horses for blind people.

== Characteristics ==
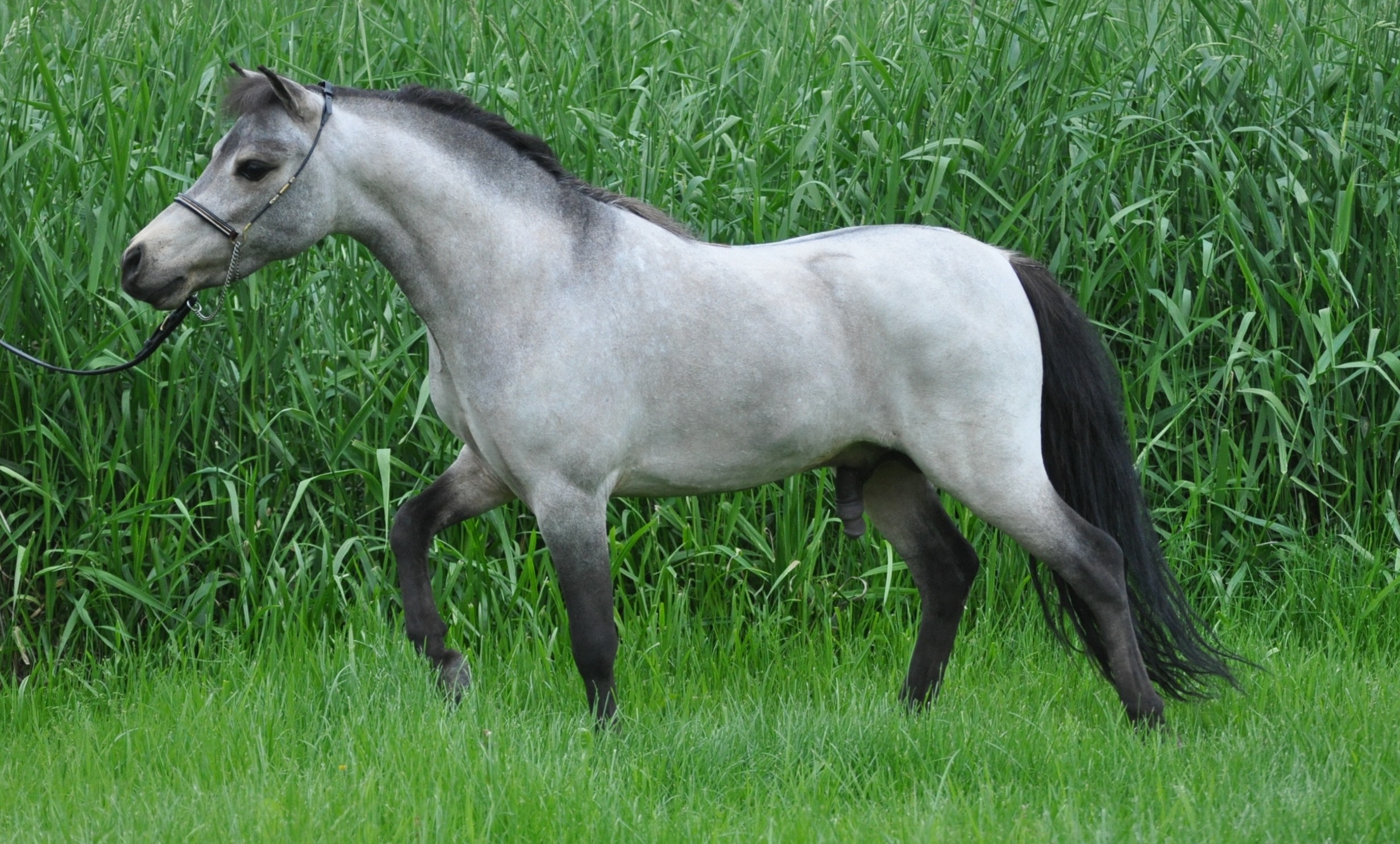
Show type

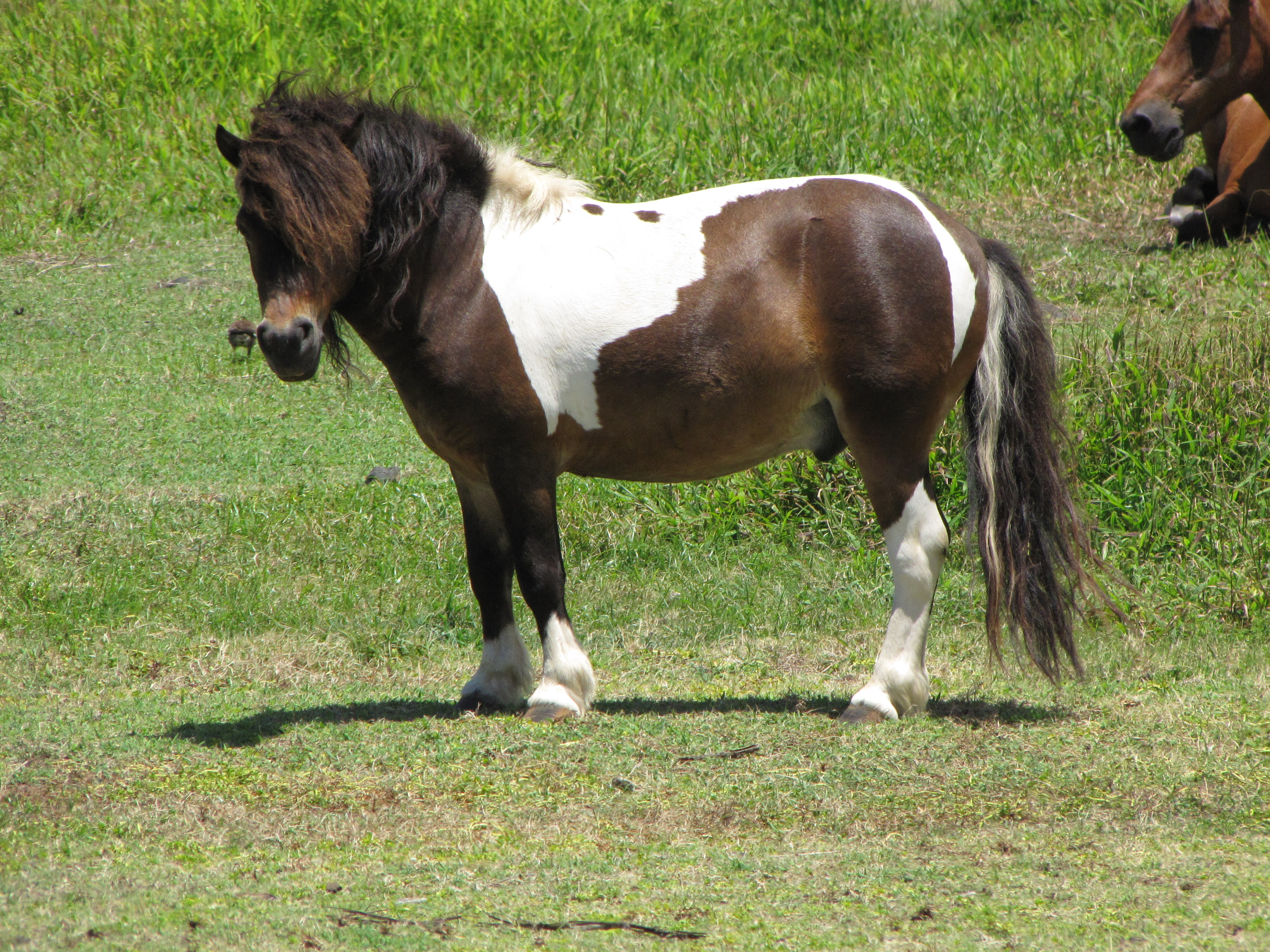
Pony type

Miniature horses are generally quite hardy. They often live for longer than is typical for full-sized horses of some breeds; the usual life span is from 25 to 35 years.

Their predisposition to disease is markedly different from that of full-sized horses. They are only rarely affected by ailments such as laryngeal hemiplegia, osteochondrosis or navicular disease, all of which are common in larger horses, but are much more likely to develop other illnesses rare in large horses, such as hyperlipaemia — which may lead to hepatic lipidosis — or eclampsia. Dental misalignment and overcrowding are more common than in larger horses: brachygnathism ("parrot mouth") and prognathism ("sow mouth") are often seen; retention of caps can occur, as can infection of the sinuses associated with tooth eruption. Poor mastication can contribute to an increased incidence of colic caused by enteroliths, faecoliths, or sand.

== History ==
Miniature horses originated in Europe, where there is written and iconographic documentation of them from the late eighteenth century. In the first half of the twentieth century small horses were bred in England by Lady Estella Mary Hope and her sister Lady Dorothea.

The Falabella was developed in Argentina in the mid-1800s by Patrick Newtall. When Newtall died, the herd and breeding methods were passed to his son-in-law, Juan Falabella. Falabella added additional bloodlines including the Welsh Pony, Shetland pony, and small Thoroughbreds. With considerable inbreeding he was able to gain consistently small size within the herd.

The South African Miniature Horse was bred in South Africa from about 1945, when Wynand de Wet of Lindley began selective breeding of Shetland stock. In 2011 there were about 700 of the horses in the country. Morphology is variable: some have an Arab appearance, while others have the conformation of a draft horse. A breed association was established in 1984, and in 1989 the South African Miniature was recognized by the national South African Stud Book and Livestock Improvement Association.

== Use ==
Miniature horses are commonly kept as companion animals. They are often too small for any but the smallest riders to ride, but are suitable for driving. Some may participate in other horse show events. A small number have been trained as guide horses for blind people, particularly for those who consider dogs unclean, as is common in Muslim cultures.

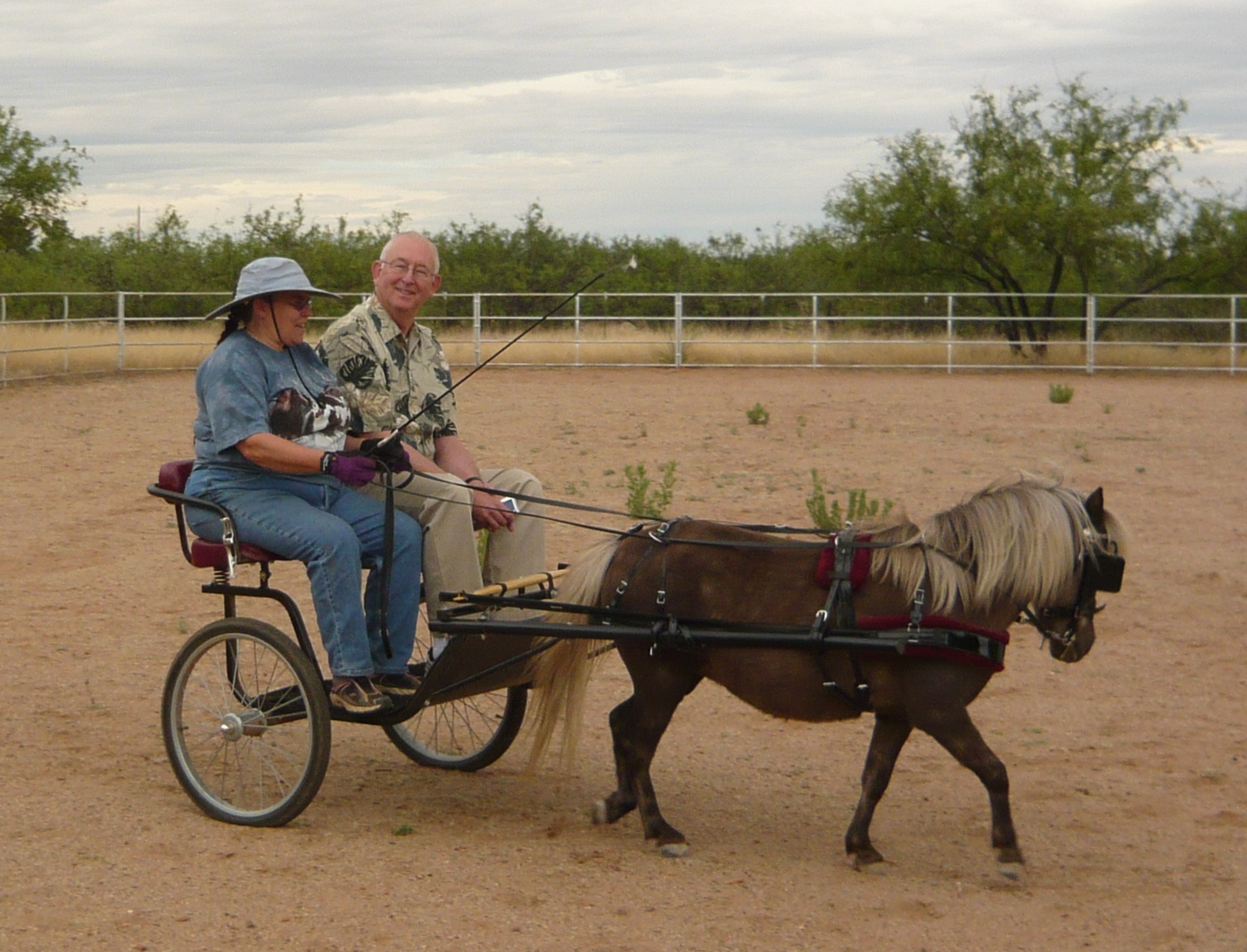
Driving

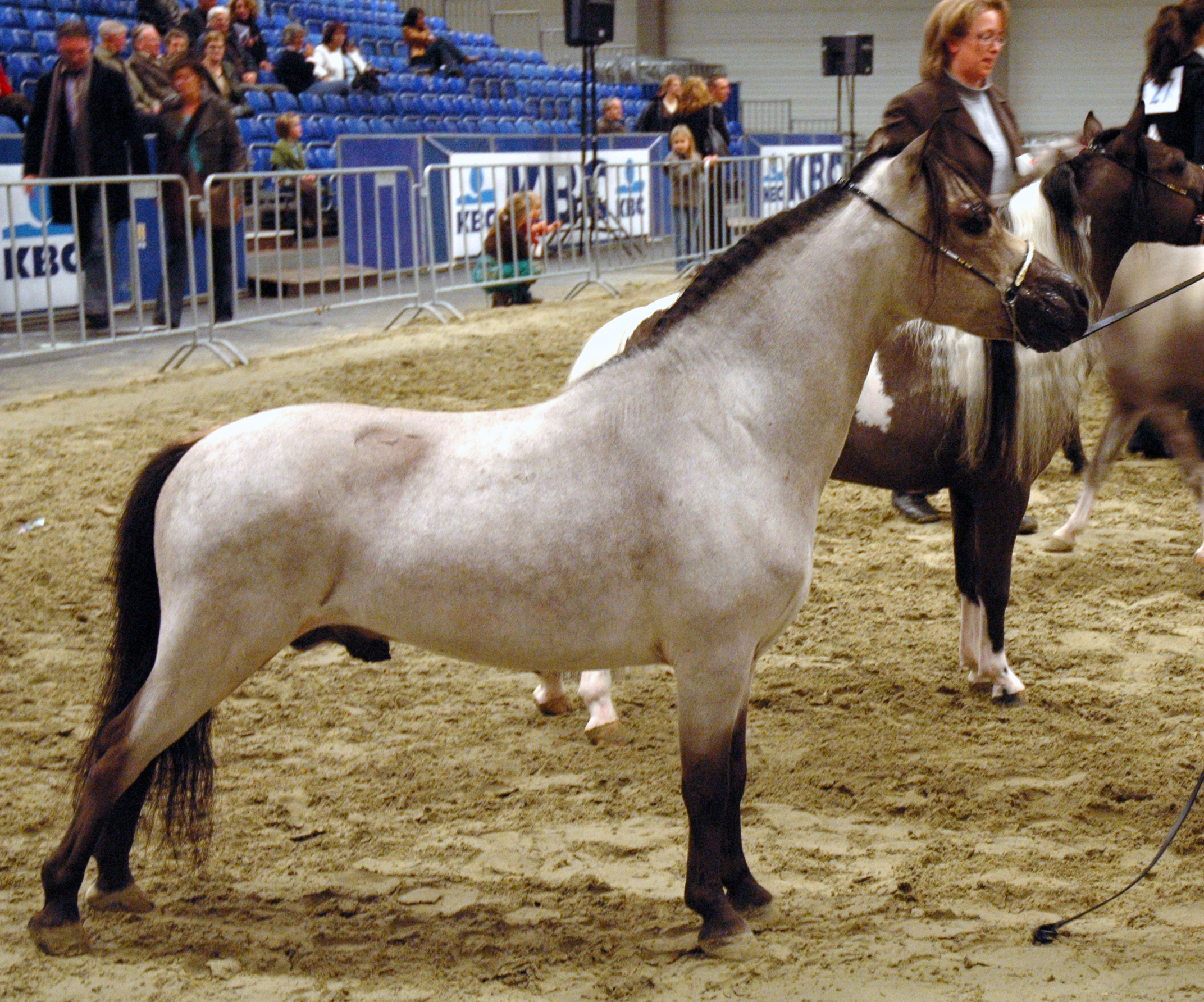
Showing

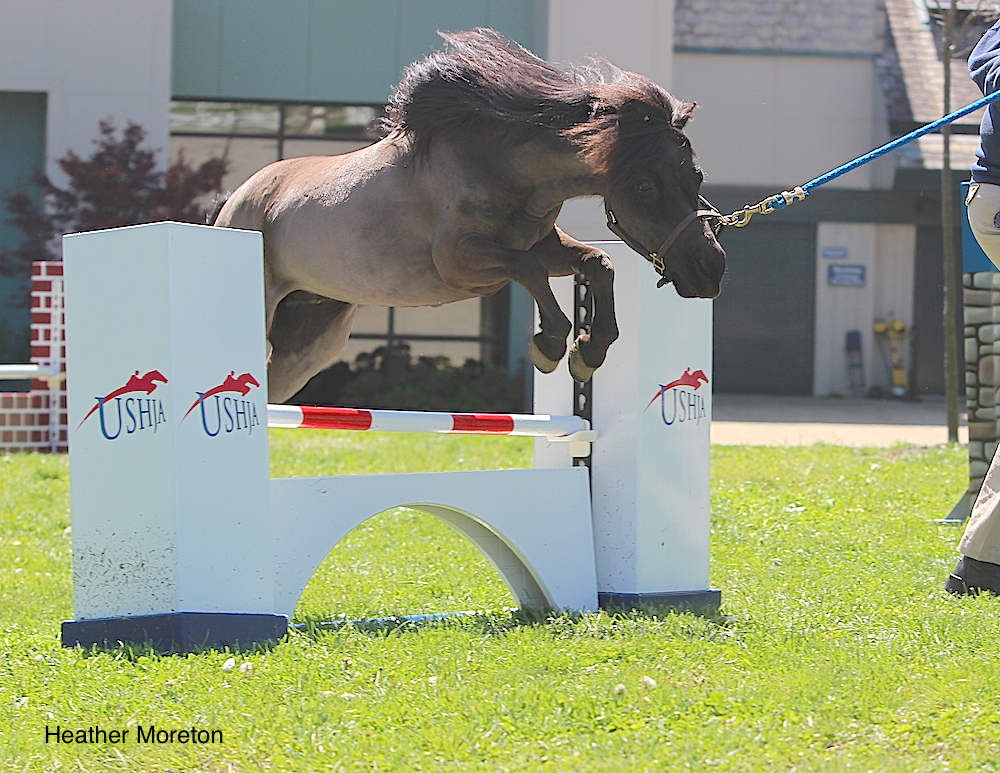
In-hand jumping

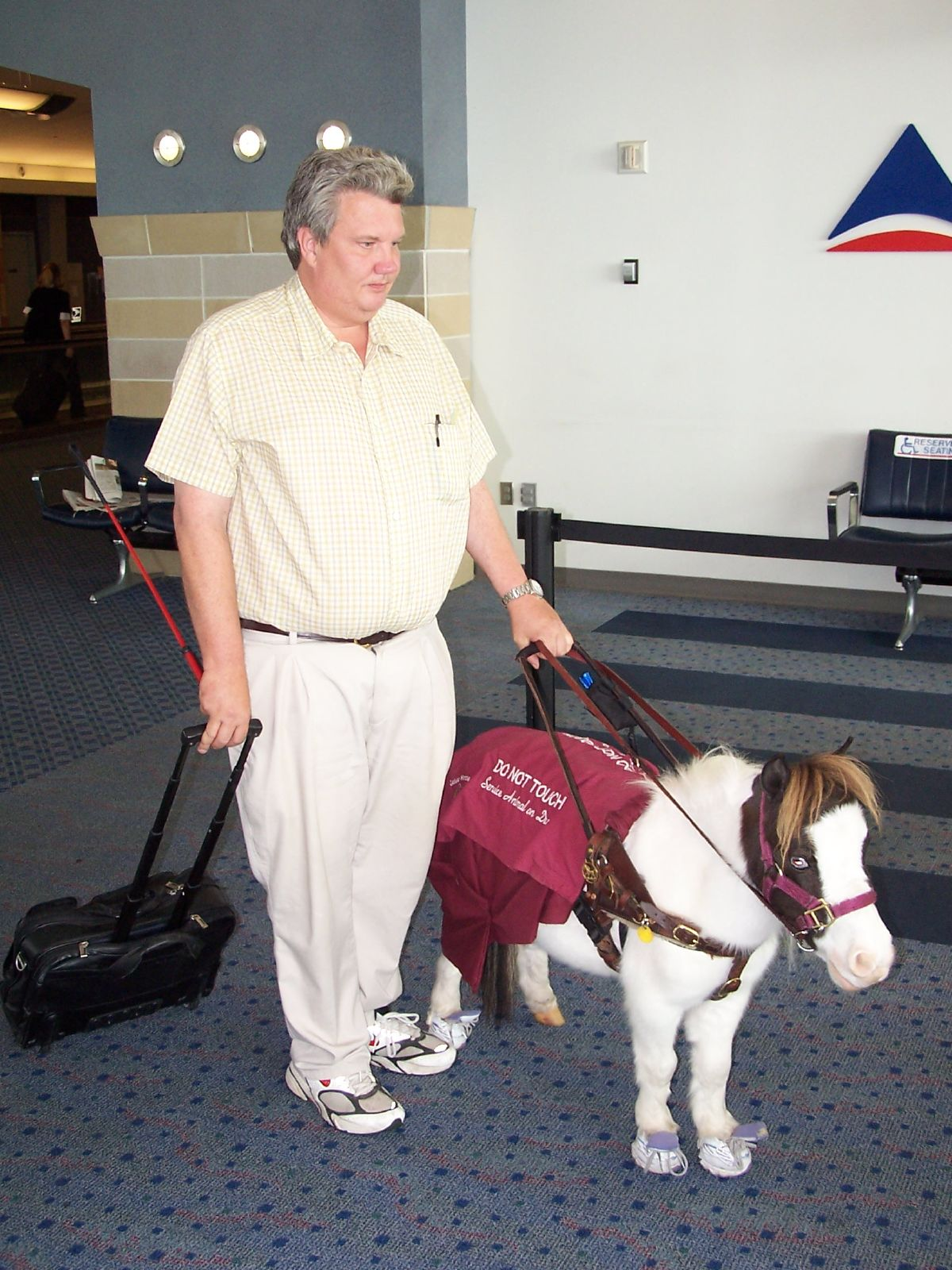
Guide horse

== See also ==
- Miniature cattle
