= Sosamma Iype =

Indian animal conservationist

- Born: 1941 (age 84–85); Niranam, Thiruvalla, Travancore, British India
- Citizenship: India
- Education: Union Christian College, Aluva, Veterinary College, Mannuthy, National Dairy Research Institute, Karnal, Haryana.
- Occupation: Animal Conservationist
- Known for: Conservation of Vechur Cow
- Spouse: Late Dr. Abraham Varkey
- Children: Dr. Rebecca Varghese, George Abraham
- Parent(s): Kottayil Varghese Iype and Mariamma Iype
- Awards: India Biodiversity Award
- Honours: Padma Shri

Sosamma Iype is an Indian animal conservationist from Niranam, Pathanamthitta district, Kerala. She was the former Head of the Department of Genetics and Animal Breeding at the Kerala Veterinary University and was awarded the Padma Shri for the year 2022 by the Government of India for her services to conserve the Vechur cow, a native breed of cattle. She has devoted her life to the conservation of the Vechur cows and is often called "Vechur Amma," literally meaning mother of Vechur cows.

== Biography ==
Sosamma Iype was born in 1941 at Niranam village in Thiruvalla of present-day Pathanamthitta district. She was a Professor and researcher at Kerala Veterinary University (formerly Mannuthy Veterinary College). Sosamma, who holds a PhD from the National Dairy Research Institute, Karnal, Haryana worked as Head of the Department of Genetics and Animal Breeding at the Kerala Veterinary University. She retired from Kerala Veterinary University in 2001 as the Director, Centre for Advanced Studies in Animal Genetics & Breeding. Despite retiring from official life, Sosamma is still active in the Vechur Conservation Trust, an NGO formed for the conservation of domestic animals and birds of Kerala State.

=== Personal life ===
She and her husband late Abraham Varkey (Retd. Professor of Surgery, Kerala Veterinary University) have two children Dr. Rebecca Varghese and George C Abraham. She now lives in Mannuthy, Thrissur district.

== Conservation of Vechur Cows ==
The Vechur Cow is a rare breed of Bos indicus cattle named after the village Vechur in Kerala. Dr. Sosamma Iype with like-minded conservationists in Kerala, started a 30-year conservation project in 1989 to save the endangered Vechoor cows. In the early nineties, Sosamma and her husband, Dr. Abraham Varkey, who was also a veterinarian, traveled for years with a group of young vet graduates to remote villages in the Pathanamthitta, Alappuzha and Kottayam districts in search of pure bred Vechur cows. The 8 Vechur cows thus obtained were paid for and kept in the stables of the Kerala Veterinary University. Multiple Ovulation and Embryo Transfer (MOET) technique was used for breeding the cows. By 1998, the number of animals in the unit had increased and about 30 animals had been sold to cattle farmers to set up some field units. At present there are about 7,000 Vechur cows in the state. Her interventions are considered by some people to be the second major biodiversity conservation initiative in Kerala after the campaign to protect the environmentally vulnerable Silent Valley.

Opponents of the project have accused that the group is working against government policy by reintroducing an unproductive cattle breed. When the project was successful, Sosamma was accused of collaborating with the Roslin Institute in Edinburgh to patent the vechur cow's genetic code. Environmentalist Vandana Shiva had claimed that the Roslin Institute in Scotland obtained a patent for discovering the genetic makeup of Vechoor cows. "The patent number is E.P.765390 and the scientists behind the project of Sosamma are behind it" Shiva said. The national media and the international journal Nature published it with a great prominence. But the investigations on this allegation proved to be false. The controversy, which began in 1998, took two years to resolve. Based on her experiences in conservation of Vechur cows, she has written a book named Vechur Pashu: Punarjanmam which literally means "Vechur Cow: Rebirth."

== Awards and honors ==
- Padma Shri 2022
- India Biodiversity Award 2016 from the United Nations Development Programme (UNDP), Indian Ministry of Forest, Environment, and Climate Change and National Biodiversity Authority of India.
- Award from the Food and Agriculture Organization (FAO)
