= Miniature cattle =

Breeds of small cattle

Miniature cattle are found in various parts of the world. Some, such as the Dexter of Ireland and the Vechur of Kerala, India, are traditional breeds; others have been created by selective breeding. The Australian Lowline was the unexpected result of a scientific experiment. Some, but not all, miniature breeds display achondroplasia, or dwarfism.

Compared to larger cattle, miniature cattle require less space and less feed, and may be easier to handle. They do less damage to pasture land, do not need such high or strong fencing, and do not produce as much methane.

== Breeds ==
Breed	Origin	Height/weight	Image	Notes
Achham	zebu, Achham District of Nepal	Males: 97 cm; Females: 88 cm		
Australian Lowline	derived from Aberdeen Angus in Australia	Males: 110 cm; Females: 100 cm		
Dexter	traditional Irish breed	92–107 cm		
Kasagarod	traditional breed, Kerala, India	80–90 cm		
Lagune or Dahomey	Benin, Congo, Côte d'Ivoire, Gabon, Togo	Males: 100 cm; Females: 80 cm		
Miniature Texas Longhorn	United States	not over 115 cm		
Miniature Zebu	modern breed register, United States	Males: 182–272 kg; Females: 136–227 kg; Maximum height: 107 cm (42 in)		
Minivaca	Mexico	about 100 cm		developed from the 1970s at the Universidad Nacional Autónoma de México in Mexico City by selective breeding of Indu-Brasil for small size.
Niata	Uruguay, Argentina; now extinct			
Panda cow	United States			rare type of black-and-white belted miniature; in 2011 the total number world-wide was estimated at 24 head.
Punganur	Andhra Pradesh, India	Males: 107 cm, 240 kg; Females: 97 cm, 170 kg		
Somba	Benin, Togo	Males: 110 cm; Females: 85 cm		
Vechur	traditional breed, Kerala, India	about 87 cm		

An American breeder, Richard Gradwohl, has developed eighteen different strains of miniature cattle. Miniature Galloway, Hereford and Holstein have been bred. In the United States, small zebuine cattle deriving from stock imported from Brazil, the Dominican Republic and Sweden may be registered as "Miniature Zebu"; in Australia, similar cattle may be known as "Nadudana". In the United States, Jersey cattle of the original island type may be known as "Miniature Jersey"; Jersey cows stand about 115–120 cm and weigh some 350 kg.

The Ethiopian Goffa and Guraghe breeds in the Abyssinian Shorthorned Zebu group are also small.
