= Achham cattle =

Breed of cattle

Achham cattle are a breed of zebu cattle found in the Achham region of Nepal. Achham cattle are a small breed less than 1 meter in height at the withers. It is also called Naumuthe cow as it measures only nine fists from its hoof to hump.

Achhami cattle (Bos indicus) are in the list of unique flora/fauna of Nepal. They are suitable for hill conditions and low input systems, used mainly for milk production. Body color varies from black to white, i.e. black, brown, grey, white, spotted black and white. According to the annual report of Animal Breeding Division, Nepal Agriculture Research Council (2005), cows average 88 cm in height at the withers with an average weight of 110 kg. Bulls average 97 cm at the withers and weigh on average 150 kg. They are reared by the farmers of the Far Western Development Region of Nepal, particularly in Achham, Bajhang, Bajura, And Doti districts.
