= Baggara cattle =

Breed of cattle

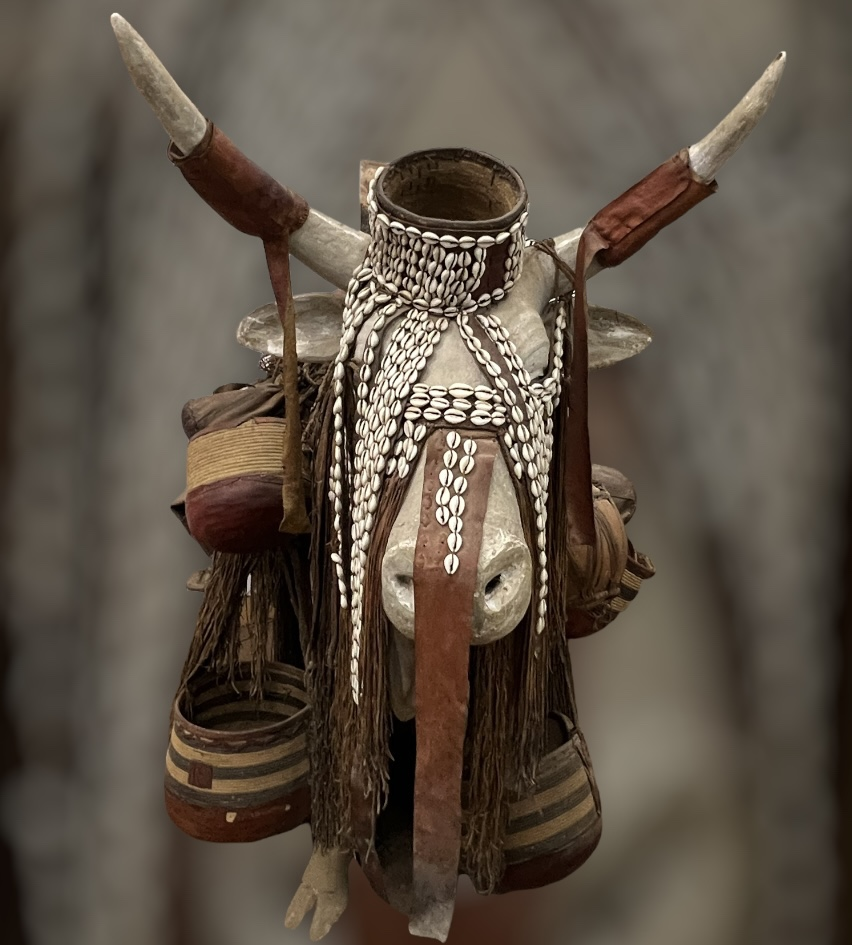
Baggara bull trappings, Sudan Ethnographic Museum 2022

Baggara cattle are an autochthonous Sudanese breed, part of the shorthorned Zebu group of breeds of eastern Africa. Baggara cattle are smaller and thinner than the Boran breed of Kenya and Ethiopia. They are named for the Baggara people of western Sudan and central Chad, who raise Baggara cattle primarily for beef. Baggara means cattle people in the Shuwa Arabic language of these people. The related Butana and Kenana breeds of the Nile Valley are dairy breeds and need much more feed and water than the Baggara.

Baggara are characterized by their adaptive characteristics and high performance in hot and dry agro-ecosystems such as in the dry Sahel. The Baggara breed is being improved by breeding projects of the Sudanese Department of Agriculture.
