= Lahari =

- Lahari Music, Indian music company
- Lakshmi Sharma, Indian actress mononymously known as Lahari
- Lahari Bandar or Lāhaṟī, historical port city in southern Sindh
- Lahari (film), a 2025 Odia-language film

== See also ==
- Lehri (disambiguation)
- Lahar (disambiguation)
