= Kachhi District =

District in Balochistan, Pakistan

Coordinates: 29°10′N 67°50′E

Kachhi District ضلع کچّھی
- District of Balochistan
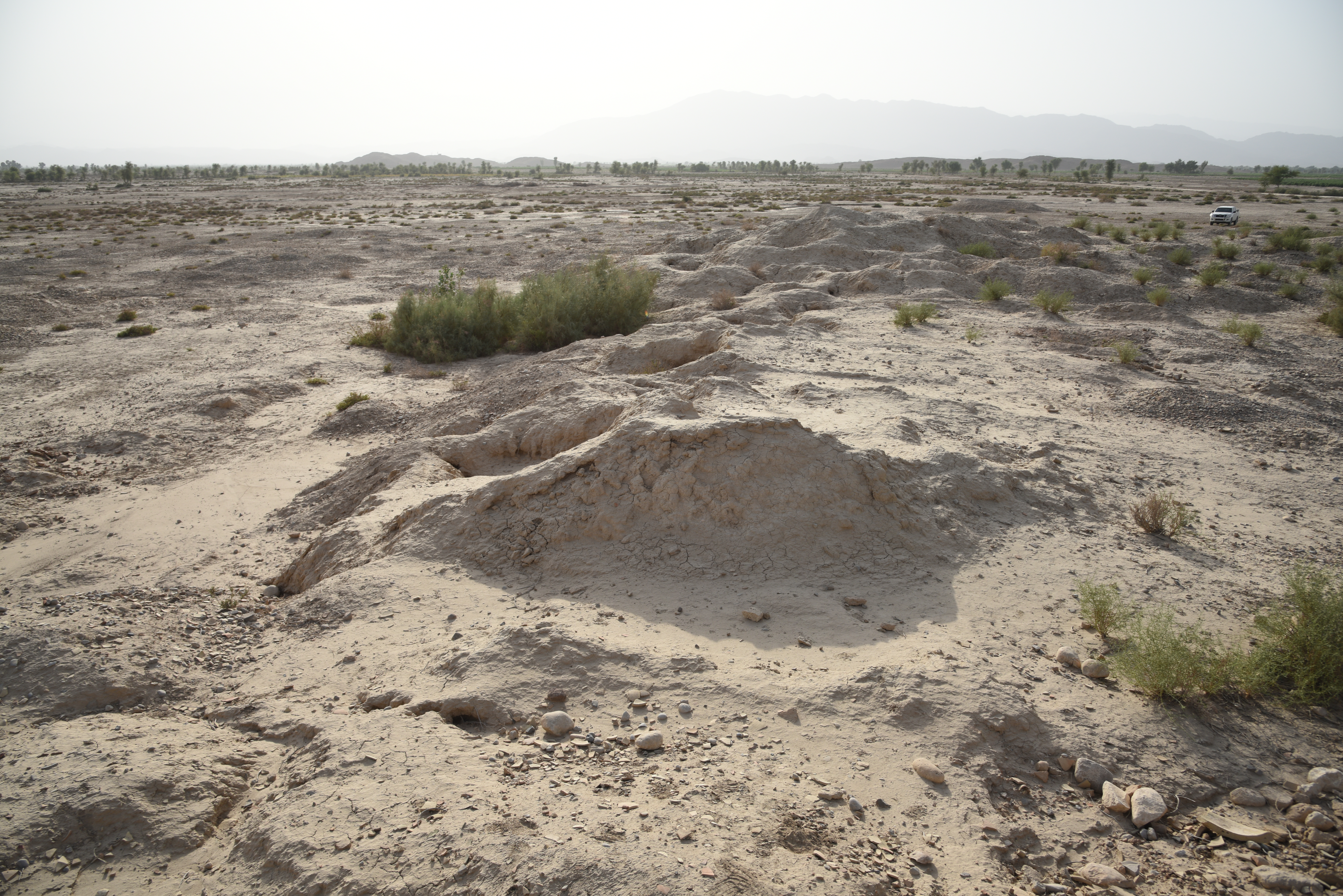
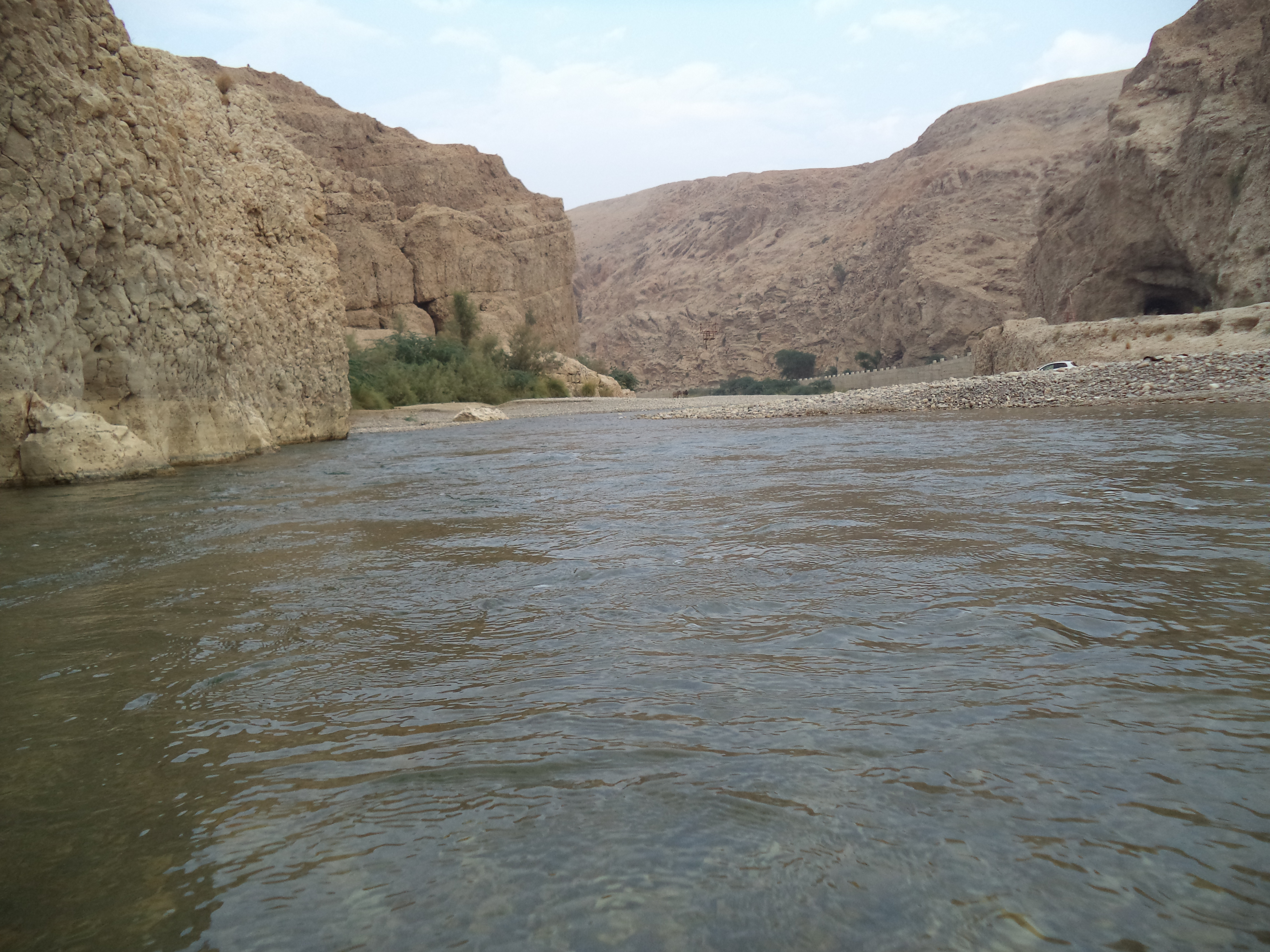
- Top: Ruins of Mehrgarh; Bottom: Seasonal river in Kachhi district

- Map of Balochistan with Kacchi District highlighted
- Country: Pakistan
- Province: Balochistan
- Division: Sevi Division
- Established: December 1991
- Headquarters: Dhadar

Government
  - Type: District Administration
  - Deputy Commissioner: N/A
  - District Police Officer: N/A
  - District Health Officer: N/A

Area
  - District of Balochistan: 5,682 km^{2} (2,194 sq mi)

Population (2023)
  - District of Balochistan: 442,674
  - Density: 77.9/km^{2} (202/sq mi)
  - Urban: 80,452 (18.17%)
  - Rural: 362,222 (81.83%)

Literacy
  - Literacy rate: Total: (30.20%); Male: (36.47%); Female: (23.29%)
- Time zone: UTC+5 (PST)
- Website: Official website

Kachhi or Kacchi (Urdu: ضلع کچّھی, Balochi: کچّی دمگ), previously known until 2008 as Bolan District, is a district located in the central part of the Balochistan province in Pakistan. The Bolan area remained under one district Kacchi until 31 December 1991. The Deputy Commissioner's office started functioning on 17 May 1992, and Bolan became one of the four districts of Naseerabad Division, until the dissolution of Divisions in 2000. In July 2026 District was annexed to Sevi Division.

In 2013, it was announced that te tehsil of Bhag would split off to form part of the new Lehri District.

== History ==
The Kachhi Plains are home to the archeological site of Mehrgarh. One of the most important Neolithic sites in archaeology, lies on what is now the Kachhi Plain of today's Balochistan, Pakistan. It is one of the earliest sites with evidence of farming (wheat and barley) and herding (cattle, sheep and goats) in South Asia.

The Kacchi is historically part of Sindh, with indigenous Sindhi population, the history of Kacchi is also closely connected with the history of Sindh. Kachhi was part of Rai and Chach dynasties of Sindh, later Soomra and Samma ruled. Around 1500, it was taken by Shah Beg of the Arghun dynasty from the Samma dynasty of the Sultans of Sindh. The territory was conquered by the Kalhora Amirs of Sindh, who were themselves displaced by Nadir Shah of Persia. Shah gave the territory to Kalat Khanate in 1740, as a blood compensation for the death of Mir Abdullah Khan Ahmadzai, in the Battle of Kachhi. Kachhi was notified as a district in February 1965. At that time Naseerabad, Jhal Magsi and Jafarabad districts were included; these were separated in 1987.

== Administrative divisions ==
The district is administratively subdivided into the following Tehsils:

Tehsil	Area (km²)	Pop. (2023)	Density (ppl/km²) (2023)	Literacy rate (2023)	Union Councils
Khattan Tehsil	277	22,900	82.67	41.86%	...
Dhadar Tehsil	976	49,836	51.06	45.10%	...
Balanari Tehsil	402	60,158	149.65	32.21%	...
Bhag Tehsil	1,308	83,687	63.98	35.24%	...
Mach Tehsil	708	75,272	106.32	38.80%	...
Sani Tehsil	2,011	150,821	75.00	15.58%	...

The Union councils of Kachhi District are:

- Noushera
- Mehram
- Machh
- Jalal Khan
- Chalgari
- Sanni
- Chander
- Gazai
- Dhadar
- Masso
- Bashkya
- Mithri

== Demographics ==
Historical population
Year	Pop.	±% p.a.
1951	...	—
1961	93,858	—
1972	123,720	+2.54%
1981	200,863	+5.53%
1998	255,480	+1.42%
2017	309,932	+1.02%
2023	442,674	+6.12%

=== Population ===
As of the 2023 census, Kachhi district has 50,032 households and a population of 442,674. The district has a sex ratio of 111.73 males to 100 females and a literacy rate of 30.20%: 36.47% for males and 23.29% for females. 165,416 (37.37% of the surveyed population) are under 10 years of age. 80,452 (18.17%) live in urban areas.

=== Religion ===
Religions in Kachhi district (2023)
Religion	Percent
Islam	97.62%
Hinduism	1.89%
Christianity	0.46%
Other	0.03%

In the 2023 census, Islam was the predominant religion with 97.62%, while Hindus were 1.89% of the population.

Religious groups in Kachhi District
Religious group	2017		2023	
Religious group	Pop.	%	Pop.	%
Islam	306,306	98.83%	436,547	97.62%
Hinduism	3,223	1.04%	8,312	1.89%
Christianity	403	0.13%	2,034	0.46%
Sikhism	—N/a	—N/a	54	0.01%
Others	—	—	83	0.02%
Total Population	309,932	100%	442,674	100%

Religious groups in Bolan District (British Baluchistan era)
Religious group	1901		1911		1921		1931		1941	
Religious group	Pop.	%	Pop.	%	Pop.	%	Pop.	%	Pop.	%
Islam	1,199	61.93%	1,422	67.84%	2,459	67.97%	3,229	68.88%	4,812	80.08%
Hinduism	582	30.06%	540	25.76%	969	26.78%	1,165	24.85%	950	15.81%
Sikhism	124	6.4%	107	5.1%	118	3.26%	173	3.69%	184	3.06%
Christianity	22	1.14%	26	1.24%	69	1.91%	91	1.94%	55	0.92%
Jainism	8	0.41%	0	0%	0	0%	0	0%	0	0%
Zoroastrianism	1	0.05%	1	0.05%	3	0.08%	0	0%	0	0%
Judaism	0	0%	0	0%	0	0%	0	0%	8	0.13%
Buddhism	—N/a	—N/a	0	0%	0	0%	0	0%	0	0%
Tribal	—N/a	—N/a	—N/a	—N/a	—N/a	—N/a	0	0%	0	0%
Others	0	0%	0	0%	0	0%	0	0%	0	0%
Total population	1,936	100%	2,096	100%	3,618	100%	4,688	100%	6,009	100%
Note: British Baluchistan era district borders are not an exact match in the present-day due to various bifurcations to district borders — which since created new districts — throughout the region during the post-independence era that have taken into account population increases.

Religious groups in the Kachhi Division of the Kalat Princely State (British Baluchistan era)
Religious group	1911		1921		1931		1941	
Religious group	Pop.	%	Pop.	%	Pop.	%	Pop.	%
Islam	84,389	90.98%	68,144	90.67%	98,852	93.36%	79,016	91.76%
Hinduism	7,176	7.74%	7,009	9.33%	7,019	6.63%	7,095	8.24%
Sikhism	1,188	1.28%	0	0%	12	0.01%	1	0%
Christianity	6	0.01%	0	0%	1	0%	0	0%
Zoroastrianism	0	0%	0	0%	0	0%	0	0%
Judaism	0	0%	0	0%	0	0%	0	0%
Jainism	0	0%	0	0%	0	0%	0	0%
Buddhism	0	0%	0	0%	0	0%	0	0%
Tribal	—N/a	—N/a	—N/a	—N/a	0	0%	0	0%
Others	0	0%	0	0%	2	0%	0	0%
Total population	92,759	100%	75,153	100%	105,886	100%	86,112	100%
Note: British Baluchistan era district borders are not an exact match in the present-day due to various bifurcations to district borders — which since created new districts — throughout the region during the post-independence era that have taken into account population increases.

=== Language ===
Languages of Kachhi district (2023)
1. Balochi (58.9%)
2. Sindhi (17.0%)
3. Saraiki (12.3%)
4. Brahui (10.2%)
5. Others (1.58%)

At the time of 2023 census, 58.88% of the population spoke Balochi, 17% Sindhi, 12.29% Saraiki and 10.25% Brahui as their first language.

== Education ==
According to the Pakistan District Education Rankings 2017, district Kachhi is ranked at number 109 out of 141 ranked districts in Pakistan on the education score index. This index considers learning, gender parity and retention in the district.

Literacy rate in 2014–15 of population of 10 years and older in the district stood at 43% whereas for females it was only 23%.

Post primary access is a major issue in the district with 86% schools being at primary level. Whereas with high schools it constitutes only 6% of government schools in the district. This is also reflected in the enrolment figures for academic year 2016–17 with 12,688 students enrolled in class 1 to 5 and only 261 students enrolled in class 9 and 10.

Gender disparity in education is another issue in the district. Only 28% schools in the district are girls’ schools. Access to education for girls is a major issue in the district and is also reflected in the low literacy rates of females.

Moreover, the schools in the district lack basic facilities. According to Alif Ailaan Pakistan District Education Rankings 2017, the district is ranked at number 139 out of the 155 districts of Pakistan for primary school infrastructure. At the middle school level, it is ranked at number 129 out of the 155 districts.

These rankings take into account the basic facilities available in schools including drinking water, working toilet, availability of electricity, existence of a boundary wall and general building condition. More than half of the government schools in the district do not have the provision of electricity, toilet and a boundary wall. 213 out of 465 schools do not have clean drinking water.

== See also ==
- Tehsils of Pakistan
  - Tehsils of Balochistan
- Districts of Pakistan
  - Districts in Balochistan
- Divisions of Pakistan
  - Divisions of Balochistan

== Bibliography ==
- 1998 District census report of Kachhi (Bolan). Census publication. Vol. 105. Islamabad: Population Census Organization, Statistics Division, Government of Pakistan. 2000.
