= Butana and Kenana cattle =

Breed of cattle

Butana and Kenana breeds are part of the shorthorned Zebu group of breeds of eastern Africa. What makes them unusual is that they are dairy breeds, unlike other breeds like the Boran, Baggara, Fung, etc. The Butana breed is found to the east of Khartoum in central Sudan, in the Butana region. The Atbarah Research Station of the Sudanese Department of Agriculture in Atbarah has a special mission for preserving and improving the Butana breed. The Kenana breed is found just south of Butana, mainly in the region between the Blue Nile and the White Nile.

== Description ==
The Butana cattle are a deep red color, like the Red Sindhi and Sahiwal of Pakistan. While somewhat smaller than the Sahiwal, the Butana is almost impossible to distinguish from the Red Sindhi. It is probable that the ancestral stock of the Red Sindhi was a principal component of the Zebu cattle brought from medieval India to Sudan over a thousand years ago to form the basis of the Butana breed, but that they are so identical after all this time is very surprising. The Kenana cattle are probably derived from the Butana, they are the same deep red as calves, but turn white when they are adults. The size, shape and milk production of both the Butana and the Kenana are almost identical to the Red Sindhi. This means they are by far the best dairy breeds in Africa, and tied for second place with the Red Sindhi after the Sahiwal as the best dairy breeds among all the Zebu breeds in the world.

== See also ==
- List of breeds of cattle
