= Jalsa (traditional sport) =

Traditional sport

Jalsa is a traditional sport of bull racing associated with the Dhanni cattle breed in the Potohar region of Punjab, Pakistan.

== Rules ==
Jalsa features a specific form of bull race, where a pair of bulls is harnessed to a panjali (yoke), and a karah (wooden plank) is tied behind them. The event involves six individuals: three controlling the bulls and three placing and pressing the karah into soft ground, thus increasing the load the bulls carry. The challenge for the bulls is to maintain speed and steadiness under this burden. The winner is determined by the crowd, based on the bull's performance, rather than by an official umpire.

== Event ==
The event operates without formal governmental oversight or the presence of police or emergency services. Crowd control is managed by the event organizers, who initially request cooperation from disruptive attendees and may resort to throwing dust as a form of non-violent deterrent if necessary.

Jalsa is a long-standing tradition in Chakwal, continuing to be held despite the influence of modern cultural changes in the region.
