= Chalgari =

Chhalgari
- Town and Union Council
- Location within Pakistan
- Coordinates: 28.57°N 67.53°E
- Country: Pakistan
- Province: Balochistan
- District: Kachhi
- Elevation: 82 m (269 ft)
- Time zone: UTC+5 (PST)

Chhalgari or chalgari is a town and union council of Kachhi District in the Balochistan province of Pakistan. It is located at an altitude of 82 metres (272 feet).
