= Sibi Bhagnari =

Breed of cattle in Pakistan

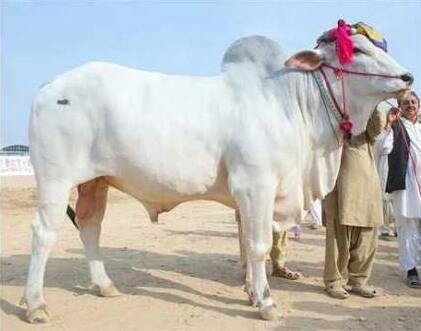
- A Bhagnari bull in Sibi
- Country of origin: Pakistan
- Distribution: Pakistan
- Use: dual-purpose, draught and beef

Traits
- Weight: Male: 1,100 to 1,600 kg (2,400 to 3,500 lb); Female: 800 to 1,100 kg (1,800 to 2,400 lb)
- Coat: white hair, grey black switch
- Horn status: horned
- Cattle; Bos (primigenius) indicus

The Sibi Bhagnari or Sibi Bull is the largest breed of Zebu cattle and originates from Sibi in Baluchistan, though also found elsewhere in Pakistan. The name is derived from that of the town of Bhag to the south of Sibi and that of the Naari, a river that flows through the area. The areas consists of Talli, Khajjak, Kurak, Mithri and Bhag. Each year the giant cattle are shown at the Sibi Mela.

== Description ==
The breed typically has a white or grey coloured body and is black around the neck and has a black tail switch. The head is medium-sized with a short strong neck, small ears, short horns, small dewlap, straight back, wide chest and a moderate sized hump. Adult bulls can grow to 84 in (2,100 mm) in height with a mass of up to 1,600 kg (3,500 lb) The bulls of the breed surpass the Brahman by more than 500 kg (1,100 lb) in mass. It is still been debated whether the Sibi is the biggest cattle breed in the world. Bulls have been shown to compete with Chianina.

Sibi Bhagnari together with the smaller White (Nukra) Cholistani cattle are the only indicine cattle which give complete white coloured animals. (Brahman is more white-greyish.)

== Environment ==
Sibi are suited to extremes in conditions; in the breeding area it copes with a temperature range from 0 to 50 °C (32 to 122 °F) and an average rainfall that is less than 400 mm (16 in).

== Farming ==
The cattle are mostly fed on dry fodder with sorghum used as green and grain. Other grains include wheat, barley, pearl millet which are fed to force weight gain. Other supplements include desi ghee, milk, yogurt, mustard oil, and occasionally eggs.
