= Dutch Miniature =

Dutch breed of horse

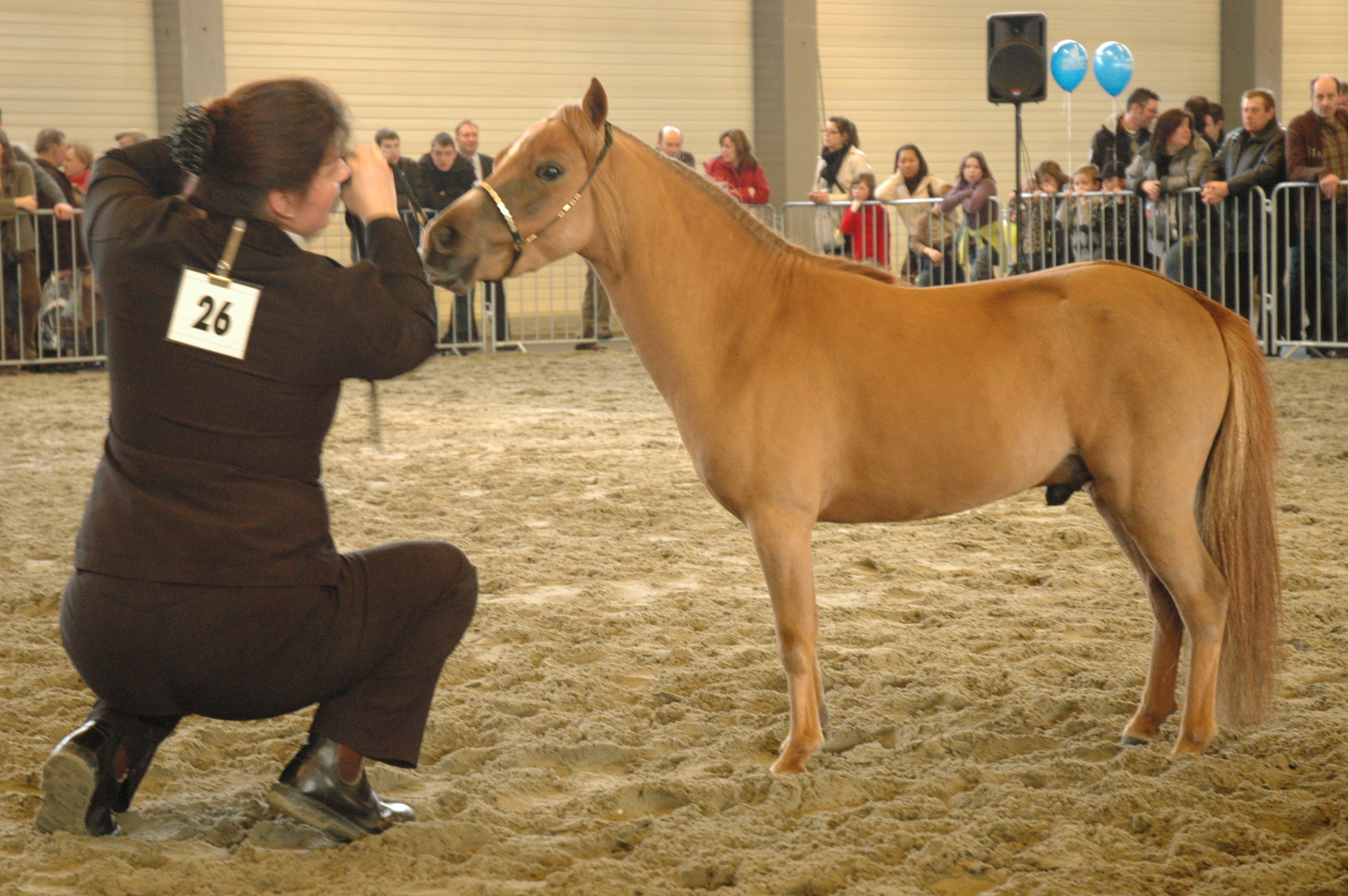
- At Agriflanders in 2009
- Conservation status: FAO (2007): not listed; DAD-IS (2022): at risk/endangered
- Other names: Nederlands Minipaard
- Country of origin: Netherlands
- Standard: Nederlandse Mini Paarden Registratie Stamboek (in Dutch)

Traits
- Height: not over 106 cm (42 in)
- Colour: any

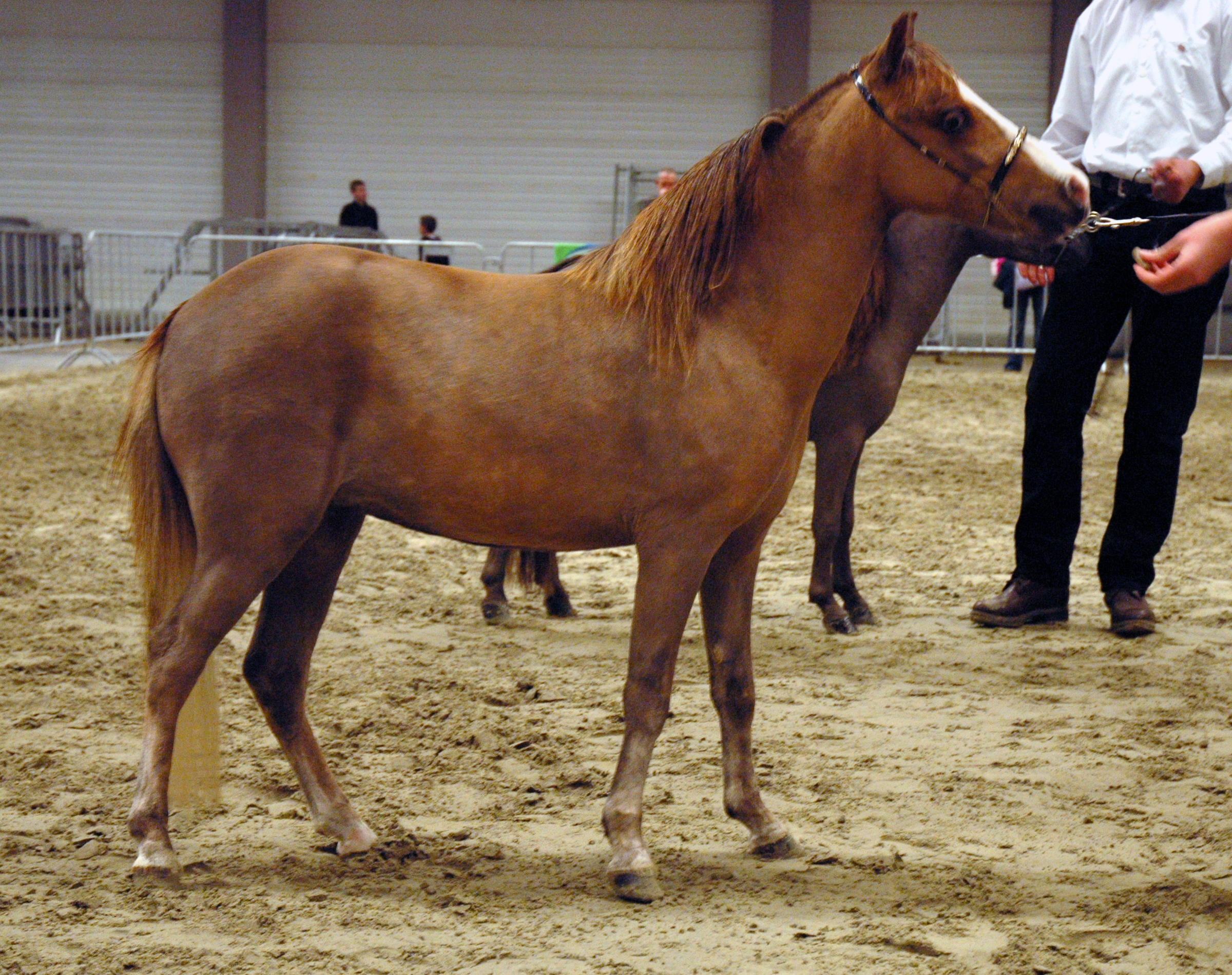
At Agriflanders in 2007

The Dutch Miniature or Nederlands Minipaard is a Dutch breed of small or miniature horse. It has been selectively bred to display in miniature the physical characteristics of a full-sized horse, and may stand no taller than 106 cm.

== History ==
The Nederlandse Mini Paarden Registratie Stamboek, the stud-book for the Dutch Miniature, was begun in 1993. At first it registered horses in two sections, one for miniature horses no taller than 86 cm, and another for small horses standing up to 106 cm. The upper section was later divided into two, "small" for horses standing 87–95 cm and "large" for those 96–106 cm.

According to the association, the stud-book listed over 34000 horses in 2023. The population reported to DAD-IS for 2022 was 4500; this figure included 2078 breeding mares and 1891 stallions. The conservation status of the breed was listed as "at risk/endangered".

== Characteristics ==
The Minipaard is expected to display in miniature the physical appearance and proportions of a full-sized riding horse, not those of a pony. The coat may be of any colour. Horses may be of any bloodline or provenance; no horse over 106 cm in height is eligible for registration.

== Use ==
Miniature horses are kept only as pets or for showing.
