= Mehram, Pakistan =

Coordinates: 28°51′0″N 67°49′0″E

Mehram
- Town and union council
- Interactive map of Mehram
- Country: Pakistan
- Region: Balochistan
- District: Kachi District
- Time zone: UTC+5 (PST)

Mehram is a town and union council of Kachi District in the Balochistan province of Pakistan. It is located at 28°51'0N 67°49'0E and has an altitude of 67 metres (223 feet).
