= American Miniature Horse =

American breed of horse

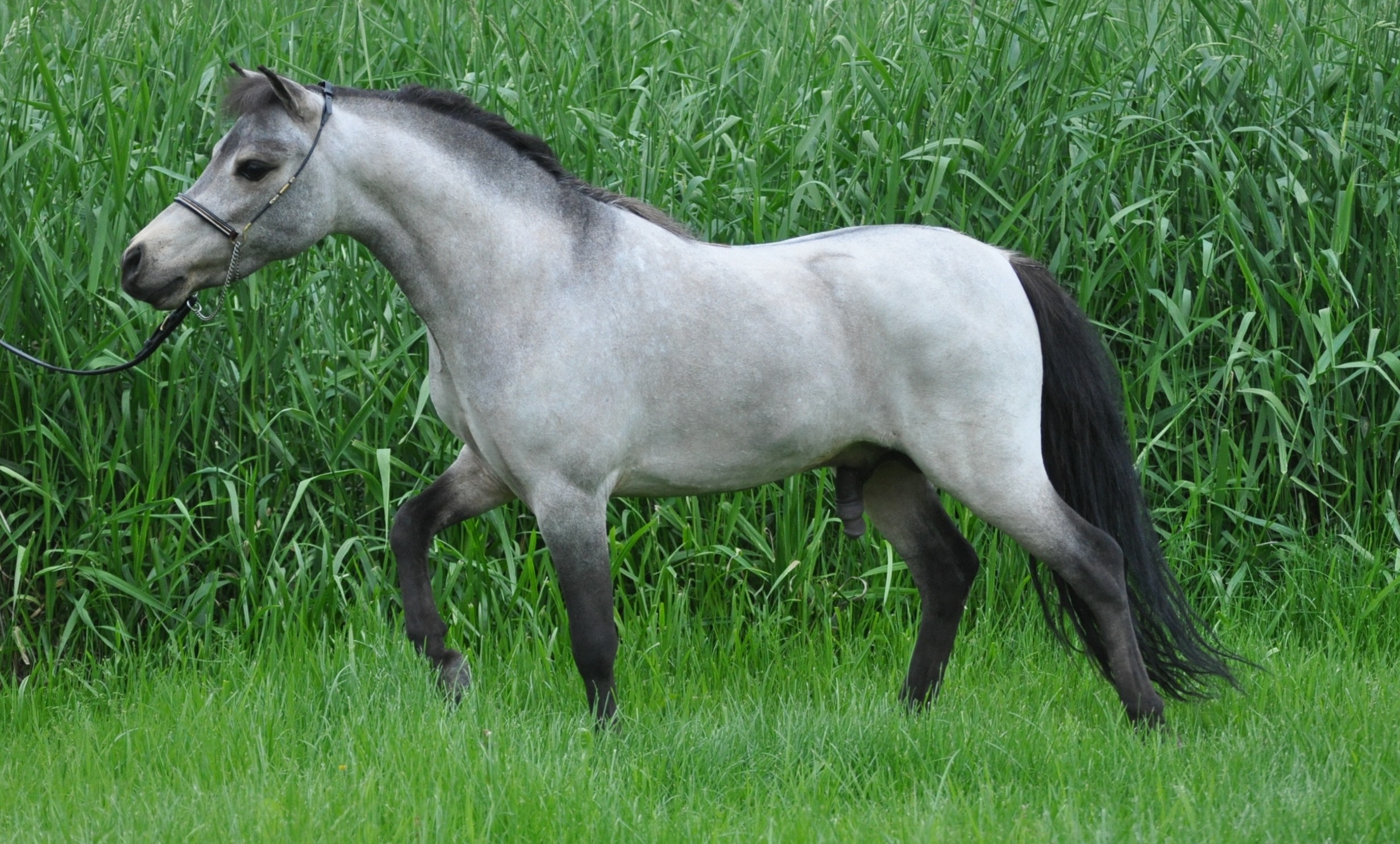
- A registered stallion of Arab type
- Conservation status: FAO (2007): not at risk; DAD-IS (2022): at risk
- Other names: American Miniature
- Country of origin: United States

Traits
- Height: not over 38 in (97 cm)
- Color: any

Breed standards
- American Miniature Horse Association; American Miniature Horse Registry

The American Miniature Horse is an American breed of small or miniature horse. It has been selectively bred to display in miniature the physical characteristics of a full-sized horse, and usually stands no taller than about 38 in (97 cm). It frequently has the appearance of either a small Arab or a small draft horse; genetically it is no different to pony breeds such as the Shetland.

== Characteristics ==
The American Miniature has been selectively bred to display in miniature the physical characteristics of a full-sized horse. It frequently has the appearance of either a small Arab or a small draft horse. Although its appearance is horse-like, it is genetically no different to pony breeds such as the Shetland.

The American Shetland Pony Club registers horses in two sections: section A is for horses no taller than 34 in (86 cm), and section B for those standing up to 38 in (97 cm). The American Miniature Horse Association does not register any horse standing over 34 in (86 cm). Height is not measured to the withers, as is usual in horses, but to the root of the last hair of the mane.

All coat colors, eye colors, coat patterns and markings are equally acceptable for registration. Some colors that are rare in full-sized American horses are seen in the breed, such as bay silver dapple – light bay with white mane and tail and black legs.

== History ==
The American Miniature Horse was developed in the twentieth century. It appears to derive at least in part from animals brought to the USA from the United Kingdom. These may have included British and Dutch pit ponies imported in the late nineteenth century and used until the mid-twentieth century in the coal mines of the eastern and central United States, and some descendants of small horses bred in England in the first half of the twentieth century by Lady Estella Mary Hope and her sister Lady Dorothea.

In 1972 the American Shetland Pony Club started a stud-book for the miniatures, called the American Miniature Horse Registry. A separate breed association, the American Miniature Horse Association, was formed in 1978.

In 2005 almost 150,000 horses were registered in the American Shetland Pony Club stud-book, and the American Miniature Horse Association register held over 160,000.

The American Miniature is distributed throughout the United States, and is also present in Germany and the United Kingdom.
