= Lohani cattle =

Breed of cattle

Lohani
- Conservation status: FAO (2007): not at risk; DAD-IS (2024): unknown
- Other names: Acchai
- Country of origin: Pakistan
- Use: triple-purpose: milk, beef, draught

Traits
- Weight: Male: 313 kg; Female: 253 kg
- Height: Male: 112 cm; Female: 102 cm
- Coat: red with white spots

The Lohani is a Pakistani breed of zebuine cattle. It is named after the Loralai District of Balochistan, and is also found in the Dera Ismail Khan District of Khyber Pakhtunkhwa. It is principally a draught breed, but may also be used for milking.

== History ==
The Lohani originated in the Loralai district of Balochistan, for which it is named, and in the Dera Ismail Khan District of Khyber Pakhtunkhwa, approximately equivalent to the former North-West Frontier Province of British India and later Pakistan. The Acchai was previously considered to form part of this breed, but was later recognised as a distinct breed.

In 2006 a breed census found a total population of 560432 head.

== Characteristics ==
The Lohani is of small or miniature size, with a height at the withers of 112 cm for bulls and 102 cm for cows. The coat is highly variable, but is most often red patched or spotted with white. The head is small in relation to the body, the horns thin and short.

== Use ==
The Lohani was used principally as a draught animal for ploughing and similar work, but also as a pack animal. It may have some aptitude as a dairy animal: some records from the 1950s show milk yields of over 900 kg per lactation.
