= Noushera =

Coordinates: 31°09′N 71°19′E

- Town and union council
- Interactive map of Noushera
- Country: Pakistan
- Region: Balochistan
- District: Kachhi District
- Time zone: UTC+5 (PST)

Noushera is town and union council of Kachhi District in the Balochistan province of Pakistan.
