= Dhadar =

Dhadar ڈھاڈر
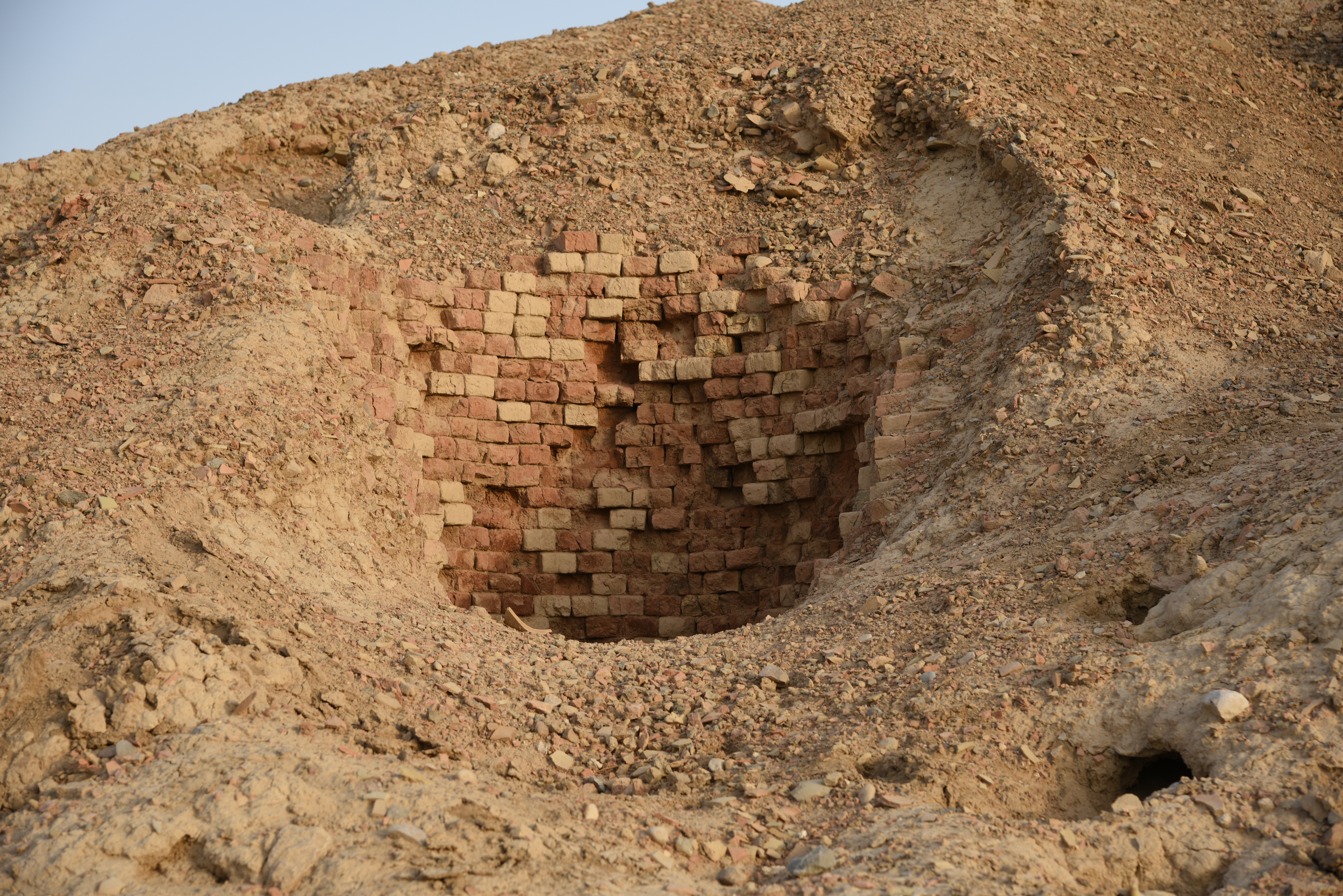
- Well at Mehrgarh Archaeological site

- Location within Pakistan
- Coordinates: 29.47°N 67.65°E
- Country: Pakistan
- Province: Balochistan
- District: Kachhi District
- Tehsil: Dhadar Tehsil
- Elevation: 132 m (433 ft)

Population (2023)
  - Total: 17,276
- Time zone: UTC+5 (PST)

Dhadar (Urdu: ڈھاڈر), also spelled Dadhar, is a town that serves as the headquarters of Kachhi District in the Balochistan province of Pakistan. The town, which consists of one Union Council, is also the headquarters of the tehsil of the same name. It is located at 29°28′0″N 67°39′0″E and has an altitude of 132 metres (436 feet).

== Demographics ==
=== Population ===
Historical population
Year	Pop.	±% p.a.
1951	...	—
1961	4,099	—
1972	4,561	+0.98%
1981	5,852	+2.81%
1998	12,818	+4.72%
2017	15,240	+0.92%
2023	17,276	+2.11%

The population of city in 1972 was 4,561 but according to the 2023 Census of Pakistan, the population has risen to 17,276.
