= Lahar (disambiguation) =

Lahar can refer to

- Lahar, a kind of volcanic mudflow
- Lahar (god), a Sumerian god
- Lahar, India, a town in Madhya Pradesh, India
  - Lahar (Vidhan Sabha constituency)

== See also ==
- Lahari (disambiguation)
- Lehri (disambiguation)
