= Lehri, Balochistan =

Coordinates: 29°11′45″N 67°38′40″E

Lehri (town) لہڑی
- Town and union council
- Interactive map of Lehri (town)
- Country: Pakistan
- Region: Balochistan
- District: Sibi District
- Tehsil: Lehri Tehsil
- Time zone: UTC+5 (PST)

Lehri is a town and union council located in Sibi District, Balochistan, Pakistan. Lehri Tehsil was created along with Bhag Tehsil to become Lehri District, a separate district in 2013; which it has later on merged back into Sibi District in 2018. The town has altitude of 107 m (354 ft).

Lehri is located at 29°10'56"N 68°12'36"E.
