= Mithri =

Village in Sindh, Pakistan

Mithri is a village in Kot Diji Tehsil, Khairpur District in Sindh province of Pakistan. Mithri is the largest village in the Khairpur district. It is situated 12 kilometers from Khairpur city and 9 kilometers from Kot Diji. The majority of its population belongs to the Rid tribe. The Muhabat Waah canal and the national highway connecting Khairpur to Islamabad is also situated next to it.

The population of Mithri is more than 8,000. Most of the population are farmers, with the second largest group in government services. Most of the civil servants work in the Education department, while a few are engineers, teachers and doctors. High, Girls Middle two mixed Elementary schools & 7 primary Schools are present in village.the village Mithri is in Khairpur district.
