= Jalal Khan, Balochistan =

Jalal Khan جلال خان
- Location within Pakistan
- Coordinates: 29.2°N 67.44°E
- Country: Pakistan
- Province: Balochistan
- District: Kachhi District
- Elevation: 89 m (292 ft)
- Time zone: UTC+5 (PST)

Jalal Khan (Urdu: جلال خان) is a town and union council of the Kachhi District in the Balochistan province of Pakistan. It is located at 29°2'0"N 67°44'0"E and has an altitude of 89 metres (295 feet).
