= Bhag =

Place in Balochistan, Pakistan

Coordinates: 26°04′N 69°03′E

Bhag بھاگ
- Interactive map of Bhag
- Country: Pakistan
- Province: Balochistan
- Division: Naseerabad Division
- District: Kacchi District
- Tehsil: Bhag Tehsil

Government
  - Assistant Commissioner: Hafiz Muhammad Tariq

Population (2023 census)
  - Total: 18,634
- Time zone: UTC+5 (PST)

Bhagnari

The Land Of Aeri

Bhag (Urdu: بھاگ) is a city located within Kachhi District of Balochistan Province of Pakistan. Bhag is famously known as Bhag Nari (Urdu: بھاگ ناڑی) too. This is due to its location near the bank of The Nari River in the Kachhi plains. Bhag Nari is the largest city town of the district and sits at an altitude of 90 meters (298 feet).

Prior to 2013, Bhag Tehsil was located within Kachhi District before being split off to become part of Lehri District (along with Lehri Tehsil) within Sibi Division, which (Lehri district) was later absorbed into Sibi District in 2018.

Also, Bolan and Kachhi are used interchangeably

- Baloch tribes: Aeri(Arbab), Chhalgari, Rind, Mastoi, Mugheri, Lund, Babbar, Gola, Bangulzai, Shahwani ,lehri, Jagirani , Jatoi.
- Sindhi tribes: Attar, Hanbhi, Kalwar, Abro, Machhi, Sheikh, Bohar, Pahore, Joya and Soomro.
- Rajput tribes: Bhatti

A minority of residents are Hindus, serving primarily as traders and playing a vital role in business. The eponymous Bhagnari community, now mostly located in Mumbai, originated in Bhag.

The tehsil comprises one municipal committee and four union councils. The municipal committee is Bhag, and the union councils are: Naushehra, Jalal Khan, Chhalgari, and Mehram.

== Demographics ==
=== Population ===
Historical population
Year	Pop.	±% p.a.
1951	...	—
1961	4,316	—
1972	7,500	+5.15%
1981	8,589	+1.52%
1998	12,181	+2.08%
2017	16,600	+1.64%
2023	18,634	+1.95%

The population of city in 1972 was 7,500 but according to the 2023 Census of Pakistan, the population has risen to 18,634.

== Bhag Nari Cattle ==
The Bhag Nari Cattle is a distinctive cattle breed from Balochistan, Pakistan known for its hardiness, adaptability, and milk-producing capabilities. It is primarily found in Nasirabad, Sibi, and Bolan districts and is well-suited to the region's arid and semi-arid climate.
