= Lehri District =

Former district in Balochistan, Pakistan

Lehri District ضلع لہڑی
- District
- Country: Pakistan
- Province: Balochistan
- Established: May 2013
- Abolished: January 2018
- Founded by: Mir Chakar Khan Domki

Area
  - Total: 3,285 km^{2} (1,268 sq mi)

Population (2017)
  - Total: 118,046
  - Density: 35.93/km^{2} (93.07/sq mi)
- Time zone: UTC+5 (PKT)

Lehri District was the 31st district in Balochistan, Pakistan. It was created in May 2013 from parts of the districts of Sibi and Kachhi. But in January 2018, the Cabinet of Balochistan decided to remove Lehri district, which would be annexed into Sibi and Kachhi.

Lehri District used to consist of the following tehsils:

- Bhag
- Lehri

Bakhtiarabad will be the headquarters of the new district carved out under section 6 of the Balochistan Land Revenue Act 1967, according to a notification issued by the revenue department on Tuesday.

It said the district would comprise the tehsils of Lehri and Bhag, except the Sorani revenue area. The tehsils have been separated from the districts of Sibi and Kachhi.

Separating Lehri from Sibi was a longstanding demand of political parties and people of the area. The number of districts in Balochistan has now reached 31.
