= Vechur cattle =

Cattle breed

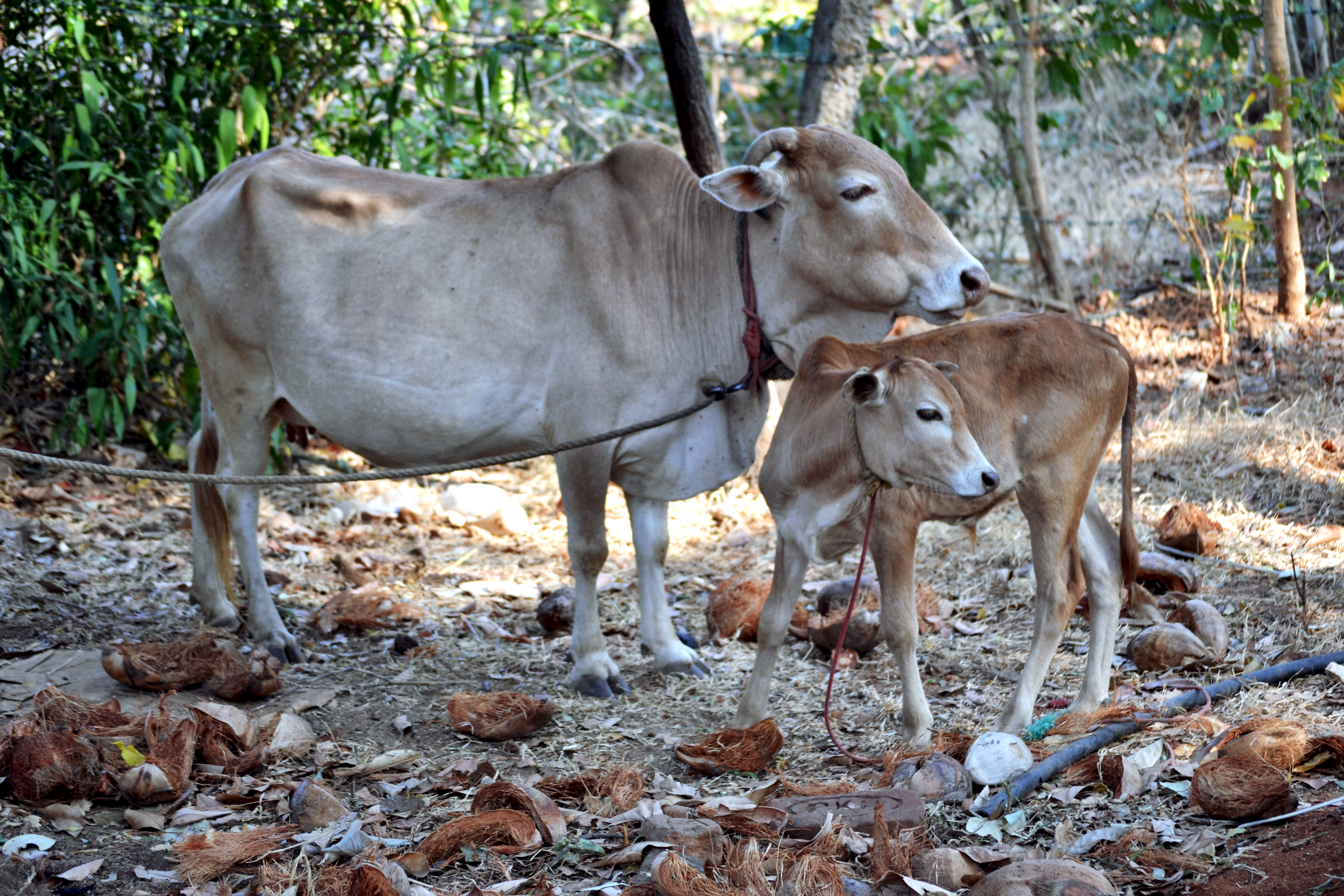
Vechur cattle

Vechur is a breed of Zebu (Bos indicus) cattle, named after the village of Vechoor in Kerala, India. With an average length of 124 cm and height of 87 cm, it is the smallest cattle breed in the world according to the Guinness Book of Records, and is valued for the larger amount of milk it produces relative to the amount of food it requires.

== History ==
The Vechur animals were saved from extinction due to conservation efforts by Sosamma Iype, a Professor of Animal breeding and Genetics along with a team of her students. In 1989, a conservation unit was started. A Conservation trust was formed in 1998 to continue the work with farmer participation.

The Vechur cow was popular in Kerala until the 1960s, but became rare when native cattle were crossbred with exotic varieties. In 2000, the Vechur cow was listed on the FAO's World Watch List of Domestic Animal Diversity, in its ‘Critical-Maintained Breeds List', pointing to imminent extinction as breeds are included in the list when the number of breeding females and males fall to very low levels. About 200 cows are supposed to exist today, nearly 100 of them with the Veterinary College.

== Characteristics ==
The breed averages about 87 cm in height and weighs around 130 kg, yielding up to 3 litres of milk a dayhis is much less than that of the hybrid varieties but, unlike them, the Vechur cow also requires little by way of feed or maintenance. The milk is believed to have medicinal qualities and easy digestibility due to smaller fat globule size. A recent report claims that the milk of the Vechur cow has more of the beta casein variety A2, rather than the variety A1 which is implicated in conditions like diabetes, ischaemic heart disease and autism.

The medicinal properties of the Vechur cow's milk have been documented traditionally in Ayurveda and recent scientific studies have explored these claims. The protein component of the Vechur cow's milk has an improved antimicrobial property. According to recent findings, the anti-bacterial property of the lactoferrin protein present in the Vechur Cow milk is more than that of the antibiotic ampicillin. Although lactoferrin, present in the milk of all mammals, is found to have antimicrobial, antiviral, antitumor, immunodefence and anti-inflammatory properties recent studies prove that in the case of the lactoferrin protein in the Vechur Cow milk, these properties are much more enhanced. The Vechur Ghee (clarified butter) produced from Vechur cow’s milk, is famous for its high medicinal values due to the presence of A2 beta-lactalbumin protein and higher arginine content which is good for the health of convalescing people.

== Controversies ==
A controversy arose in 1997 when environmentalist Vandana Shiva alleged that a Scottish company, The Roslin Institute, was trying to patent the cow's genetic code. Shiva described the action as piracy. The Roslin Institute denied the charge which was subsequently proved to be baseless.
