= Cholistani cattle =

Breed of cattle in Pakistan

Cholistani
- Country of origin: Pakistan
- Distribution: Cholistan Desert
- Use: meat, milk and draft

Traits
- Weight: Male: 600 kg; Female: 400 kg
- Coat: white
- Horn status: small
- Cattle; Bos (primigenius) taurus

The Cholistani is a zebu breed of Punjab in Pakistan primarily used in dairy production. The Cholistani originated from the Cholistan Desert area, particularly from Rahim Yar Khan, Bahawalpur and Bahawalnagar. This is a recently discovered breed and is thought to have resulted from cross-breeding of Sahiwal with other local breeds.

== Description ==
The Cholistani is a large cattle with white coat with black, brown or red spots, they have small horn, long ears, males have a large hump and females have medium-sized udders which can yield 1,200 to 1,800 litres/lactation. Males weigh between 500 and 600 kg, while females weight between 300 and 400 kg. They have good immune system and are use for both milk and beef. Females can yield 7 to 12 litres milk per day. Crossbred cow with Holstein Friesian can yield 15 to 20 litres milk with proper care.

The hump on the back of Cholistani cattle is its distinctive feature as it is larger than any other breed whilst sharing the same size of hump with the Dhanni breed of Punjab, Pakistan, from Chakwal District.
