= Dhanni (cattle) =

Pakistani breed of cattle

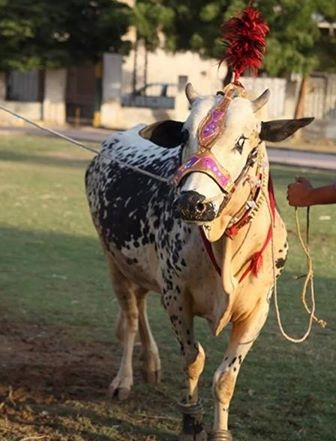
- Bull at Karachi
- Conservation status: FAO (2007): not at risk; DAD-IS (2025): unknown
- Other names: Dhani; Awankari; Pahari; Pakhari; Pothwari
- Country of origin: Pakistan
- Distribution: Province of Punjab: Attock District; Chakwal District; Rawalpindi District; Jhelum District; Mianwali District; Sargodha District
- Use: draught; milk

Traits
- Weight: Male: 412 kg; Female: 285 kg
- Coat: usually white with spots of black
- Horn status: short horns
- Cattle; Bos (primigenius) indicus

The Dhanni or Dhani is a Pakistani breed of draught cattle of zebuine type. It is distributed mainly in the Attock, Chakwal, Jhelum, Mianwali, Rawalpindi and Sargodha Districts of the Province of Punjab in eastern-central Pakistan. The breed name derives from Dhan, in Jhelum District; other names for it include Awankari, Pahari, Pakhari and Pothwari.

== History ==
The Dhanni formerly consisted of three separate local populations: the Awankari or Pakhari in Talagang Tehsil and parts of Fatehjang Tehsil in Attock District, the Pothwari from Gujarkhan Tehsil and the area of Jatli in Rawalpindi District, and the Dhanni in the former Chakwal Tehsil in Jhelum District. As trade and communication between these areas increased, it was recognised that there was little significant difference between the three, and they were consolidated into a single breed, the Dhanni, which was distributed mainly in the Attock, Chakwal, Jhelum, Mianwali, Rawalpindi and Sargodha Districts of the Province of Punjab in eastern-central Pakistan.

The Nawab of Kot Fateh Khan in Attock District took steps to support the breed from 1932, including the distribution of breeding bulls in the area; other landowners took similar action. A herd-book was established in 1938, and milk yields were recorded from about the same time. A government livestock farm – now the Barani Livestock Production Research Institute – was established for the cattle in 1962 by the West Pakistan Agriculture Development Corporation at Kherimurat in Attock District; a herd of about 150 head is kept there.

In 2006 a total population of just under 1.5 million head was reported, and in 2007 the conservation status of the breed was listed by the FAO as "not at risk". No population has been reported since then, and in 2025 its conservation status was listed as "unknown".

== Characteristics ==
The Dhanni is of medium size: cows weigh on average 285 kg and bulls 412 kg; average heights at the withers are 126 cm and 135 cm respectively.

The coat is most commonly white with black spots, Urdu: chitta burga Three other coat colourings occur: black with white spots, kala burga; white mottled with black and brown, nuqra; and red with white spots, ratta burga. Short horns are present in both sexes.

== Use ==
The Dhanni is a good draught breed, capable of moving fast in quick short steps, and suitable for provision of power for industrial or agricultural machinery.

Milk yields recorded in the 1930s averaged 765 kg in lactation lasting 228 days, while yields recorded seventy years later at the government farm at Kherimurat averaged 708 kg in a longer lactation period of 270 days.
