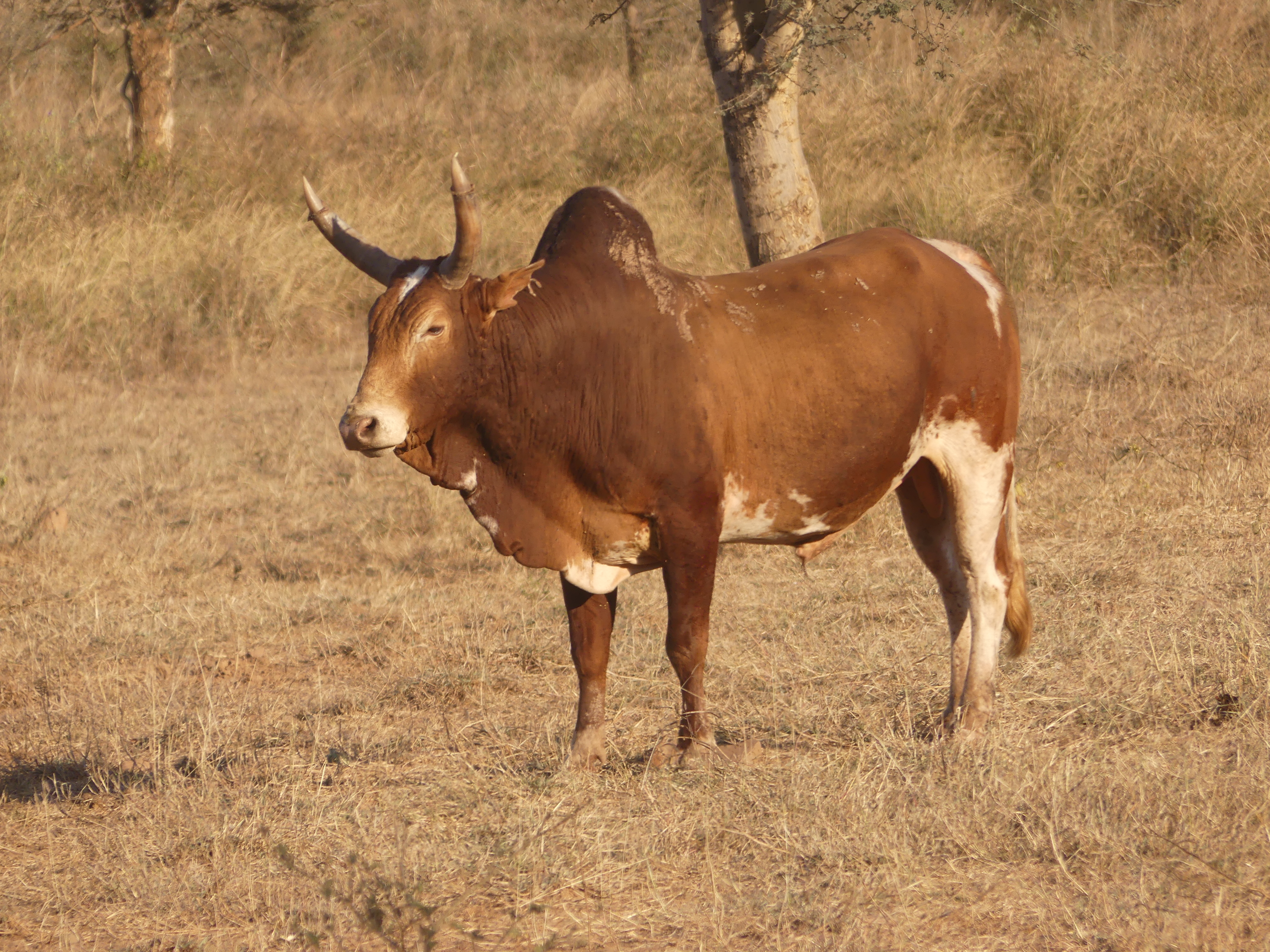

Scientific classification (disputed, see § Taxonomy)
- Kingdom: Animalia
- Phylum: Chordata
- Class: Mammalia
- Order: Artiodactyla
- Family: Bovidae
- Subfamily: Bovinae
- Genus: Bos
- Species: B. indicus

Binomial name
- Bos indicus Linnaeus, 1758

Synonyms
- Bos indicus Linnaeus, 1758; Bos taurus Linnaeus, 1758 (heterotypic); Bos domesticus Erxleben, 1777 (heterotypic); Bos zebu Boddaert, 1785; Bos longifrons R. Owen, 1844 (heterotypic); (incomplete list)

= Zebu =

South Asian domestic cattle

The zebu (/ˈziːb(j)uː, ˈzeɪbuː/; Bos indicus), also known as indicine cattle and humped cattle, is a species or subspecies of domestic cattle originating in South Asia. Zebu, like many Sanga cattle breeds, differ from taurine cattle in the fatty hump on their shoulders, their large dewlap, and their sometimes-drooping ears. They are well adapted to high temperatures and are raised throughout the tropics.

The zebu is used as a draught and riding animal, as dairy cattle and beef cattle, and as a source of byproducts such as hides and dung for fuel and manure. Some small breeds such as Nadudana (also known as the miniature zebu) are also kept as pets like dogs.

In some regions, zebu have significant religious meaning.

== Taxonomy ==
Both scientific names Bos taurus and Bos indicus were introduced by Carl Linnaeus in 1758, with the latter used for humped cattle in China.

The zebu was classified as a distinct species by Juliet Clutton-Brock in 1999, but was later classified as a subspecies of the domestic cattle, Bos taurus indicus, by both Clutton-Brock and Colin Groves in 2004 and by Peter Grubb in 2005. In 2011, Groves and Grubb classified it as a distinct species again.

The American Society of Mammalogists considers it as belonging to the species Bos taurus in analogy to Sanga cattle (Bos taurus africanus Kerr, 1792). The extinct wild aurochs (Bos primigenius) is thought to have diverged into two distinct genetic strains: the humped Bos indicus and the humpless Bos taurus.

== Origin ==
Zebu cattle are derived from the Indian aurochs and were domesticated between 6,000 and 7,000 YBP at Mehrgarh in Northern west Pakistan, with possible secondary domestication events in other parts of South Asia. The Zebu was domesticated by people arriving from Southwest Asia who promoted the neolithic development in Mehrgarh.

Phylogenetic analysis revealed that all the zebu Y chromosome haplotype groups occur in three different lineages: Y3A, the most predominant and cosmopolitan lineage; Y3B, only observed in West Africa; and Y3C predominant in southern and northeastern India.

The Indian aurochs became extinct during the Indus Valley Civilisation likely due to habitat loss, caused by expanding pastoralism and interbreeding with domestic zebu. Its latest remains ever found are dated to 3,800 YBP, making it the first of the three aurochs subspecies that died out.

Archaeological evidence including depictions on pottery and rocks suggests that humped cattle likely imported from the Ancient Near East was present in the Middle Kingdom of Egypt around 4,000 YBP. Its first appearance in the subsahara is dated to after 700 AD, and it was introduced to the Horn of Africa around 1000.

== Characteristics ==
Zebu, as well as many Sanga cattle, have humps on the shoulders, large dewlaps and droopy ears.

Compared to taurine cattle, the zebu is well adapted to the hot tropical savanna climate and steppe environments. These adaptations result in higher tolerance for drought, heat and sunlight exposure.

== Behaviour and ecology ==
Studies on the natural weaning of zebu cattle have shown that cows wean their calves over a 2-week period, but after that, continue to show strong affiliatory behavior with their offspring and preferentially choose them for grooming and as grazing partners for at least 4–5 years.

=== Reproduction ===
Zebu are generally mature enough to give birth when they are 29 months old. This is based on the development of their bodies to withstand the strain of carrying the calf and lactation. Early reproduction can place too much stress on the body and possibly shorten lifespans. The gestation period averages 285 days, but varies depending on the age and nutrition of the mother. The sex of the calf may also affect the carrying time, as male calves are carried for a longer period than females. Location, breed, body weight, and season affect the overall health of the animal and in return may also affect the gestation period.

=== Health and diseases ===
The zebu is susceptible to nagana as it does not exhibit trypanotolerance. It is said to be resilient to parasites.

== Breeds and hybrids ==
Zebu are very common in much of Asia, including Pakistan, India, Nepal, Bangladesh and China. In Asia, taurine cattle are mainly found in the northern regions such as Japan, Korea, northern China and Mongolia. In China, taurine cattle are most common in northern breeds, zebu more common in southern breeds, with hybrids in between.

Geneticists at the International Livestock Research Institute (ILRI) in Nairobi, Kenya and in Addis Ababa, Ethiopia discovered that cattle had been domesticated in Africa independently of domestication in the Near East. They concluded that the southern African cattle populations derive originally from East Africa rather than from a southbound migration of taurine cattle. The results are inconclusive as to whether domestication occurred first in Africa or the Near East.

Sanga cattle breeds is considered to have originated from hybridization of zebu with taurine cattle leading to the Afrikaner, Red Fulani, Ankole, Boran and many other breeds.

Some 75 breeds of zebu are known, split about evenly between African and Indian breeds.

List of widely distributed zebu breeds
Gyr |Kankrej and Guzerat |Indo-Brazilian |Brahman |Sibi Bhagnari |White Nukra |Cholistani |Dhanni |Lohani |Nelore |Ongole |Sahiwal |Red Sindhi |Butana and Kenana |Baggara |Tharparkar |Kangayam |Southern Yellow |Kedah Kelantan |Local Indian Dairy

Other breeds of zebu are quite local, like the Hariana from Haryana, Punjab or the Rath from Alwar district, Rajasthan.

Zebu were imported into Brazil in the early 20th century. Their importation marked a change in cattle ranching in Brazil as they were considered "ecological" since they could graze on natural grasses, and their meat was lean and without chemical residues. From the 1960s onwards, Nelore which is an off breed of Ongole Cattle became the primary cattle breed in Brazil because of its hardiness, heat-resistance, and because it thrives on poor-quality forage and breeds easily, with the calves rarely requiring human intervention to survive. More than 80% of beef cattle in Brazil (approximately 167,000,000 animals) are either purebred or hybrid Ongole Cattle.

== Uses ==
Zebu are used as draught and riding animals, beef cattle, dairy cattle, as well as for byproducts such as hides, dung for fuel and manure, and horn for knife handles and the like. Zebu, mostly miniature zebu, are kept as pets. In India, the number of draft cattle in 1998 was estimated at 65.7 million head. Zebu cows commonly have low production of milk. They do not produce milk until maturation later in their lives and do not produce much. When zebus are crossed with taurine cattle, milk production generally increases.

In Madagascar, zebu outnumber people. Zebu are wrestled by young men in a competitive ritual of courtship called tolon'omby.

Within the Indian state of Tamil Nadu, zebu are used for jallikattu.

In 1999, researchers at Texas A&M University successfully cloned a zebu.

=== Hindu tradition ===
Zebu are venerated in Hinduism of India. In the historical Vedic religion they were a symbol of plenty. In later times they gradually acquired their present status. According to the Mahabharata, they are to be treated with the same respect 'as one's mother'. In the middle of the first millennium, the consumption of beef began to be disfavoured by lawgivers.

Milk and milk products were used in Vedic rituals. In the postvedic period products like milk, curd, ghee, but also cow dung and urine gomutra, or the combination of these five panchagavya began to assume an increasingly important role in ritual purification and expiation.

== Gallery ==
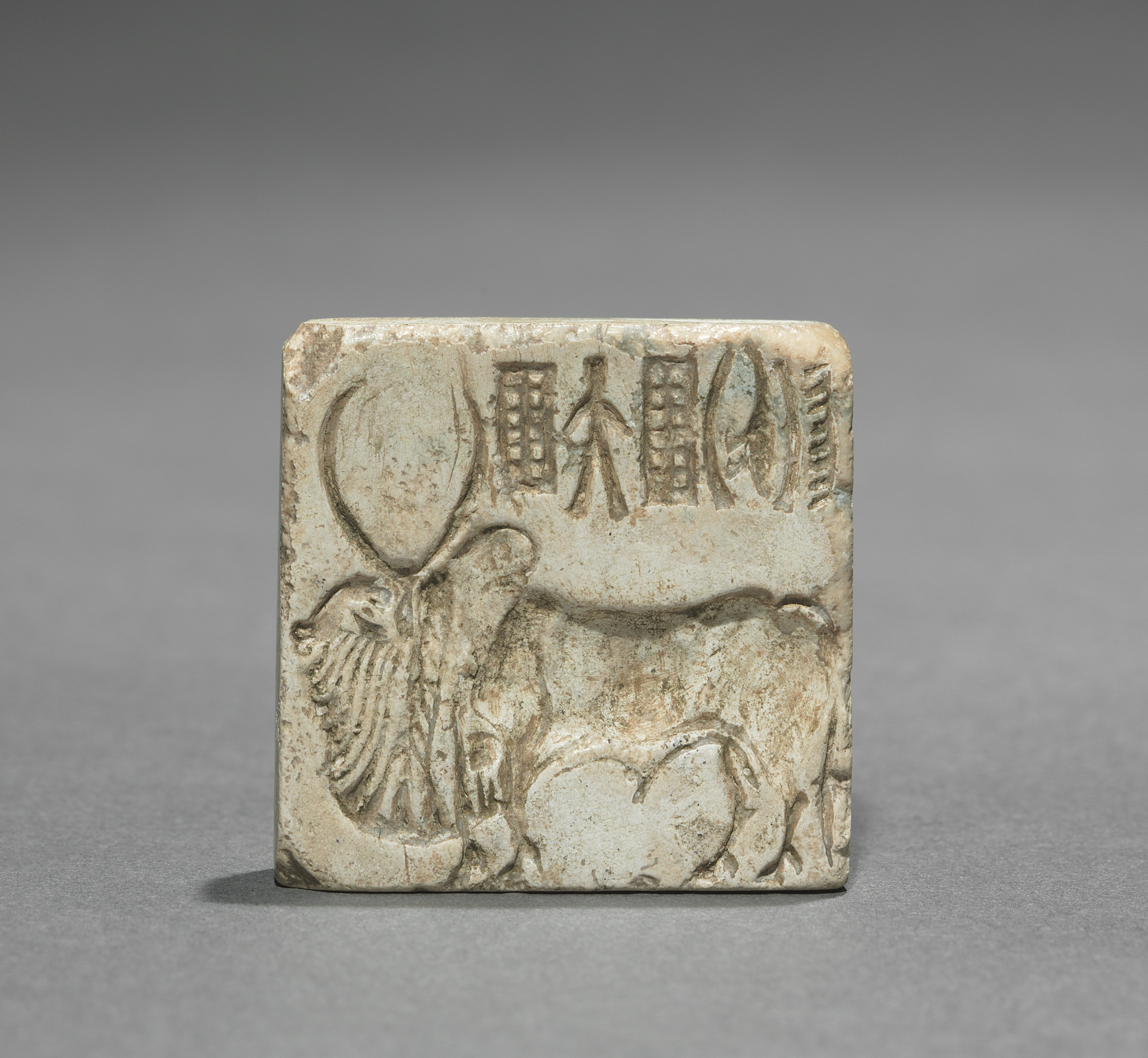
Bull in Seal of Indus valley civilization.

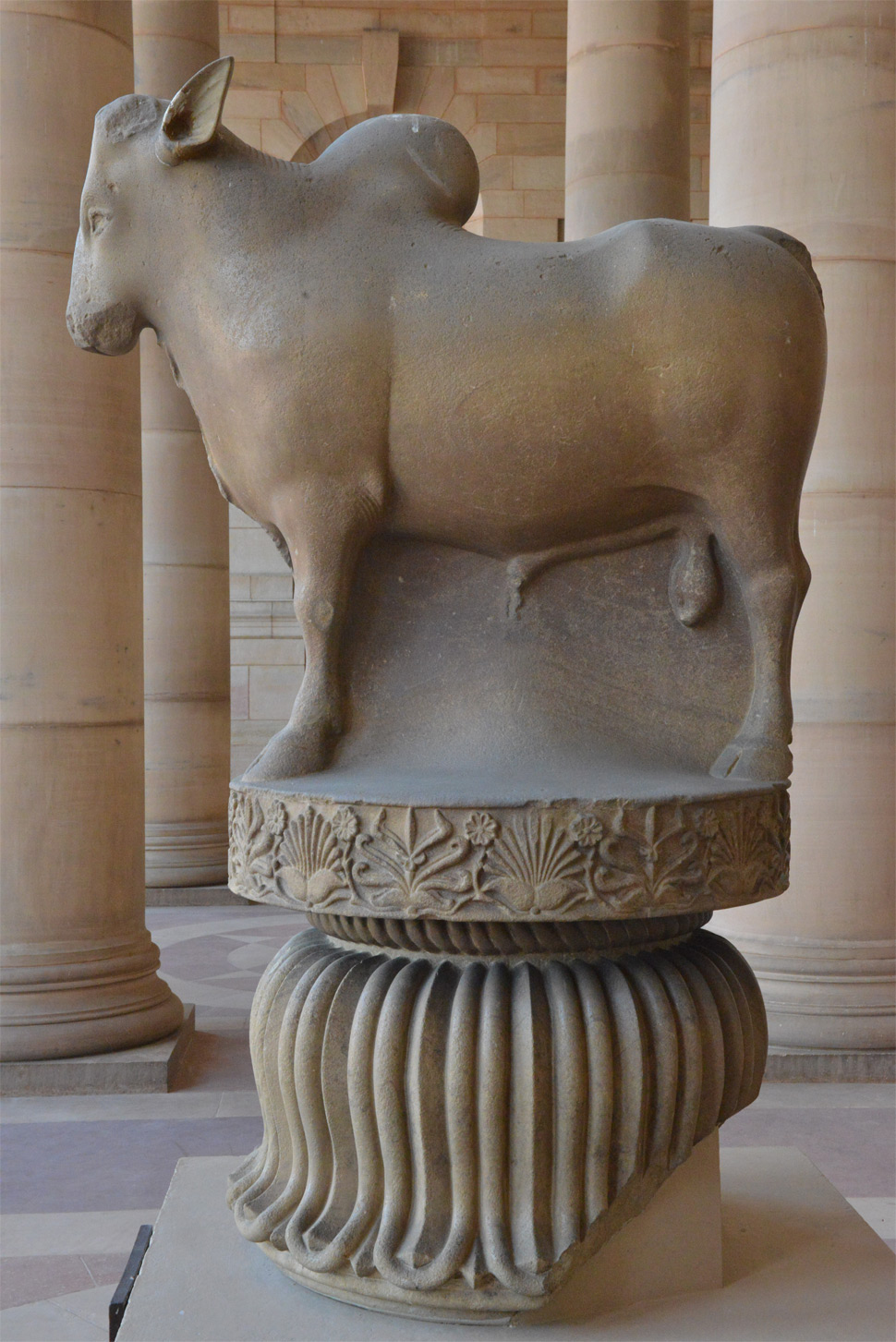
A Pillar of Ashoka, dating to the 3rd century BCE, depicting a zebu

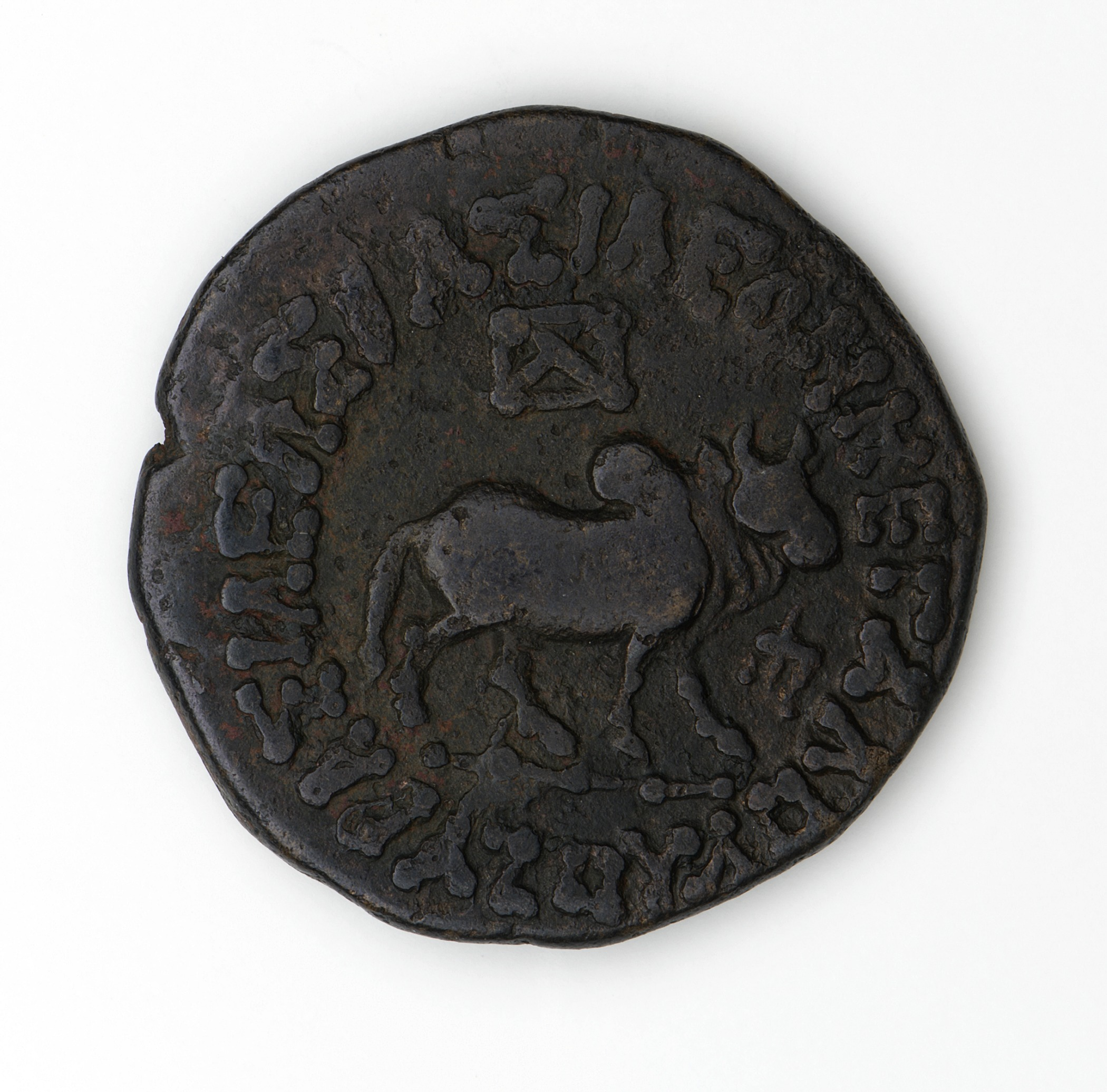
Zebu pictured on a coin of the Indo-Scythian king Azes II, late first century BCE

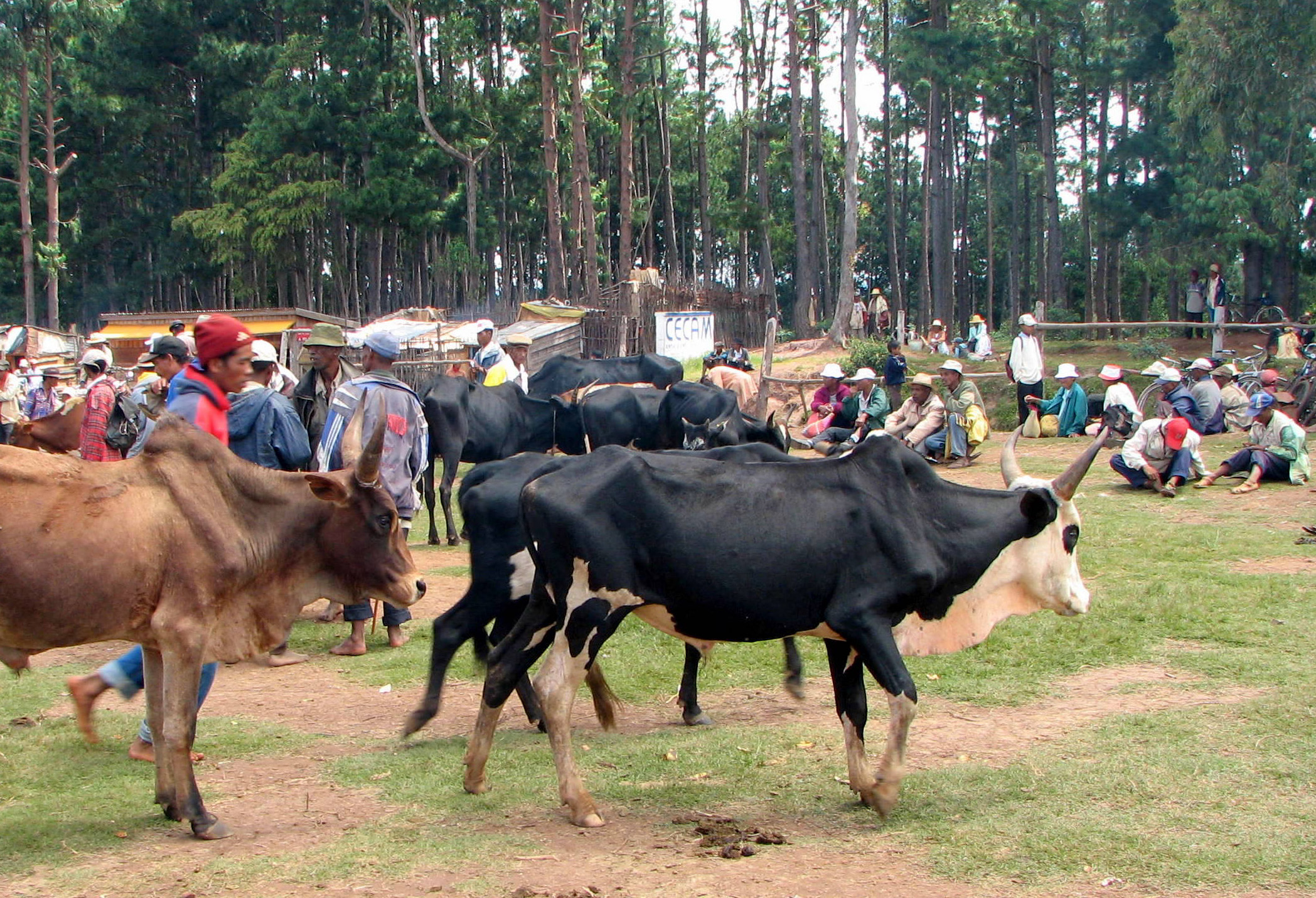
Zebu market in Madagascar

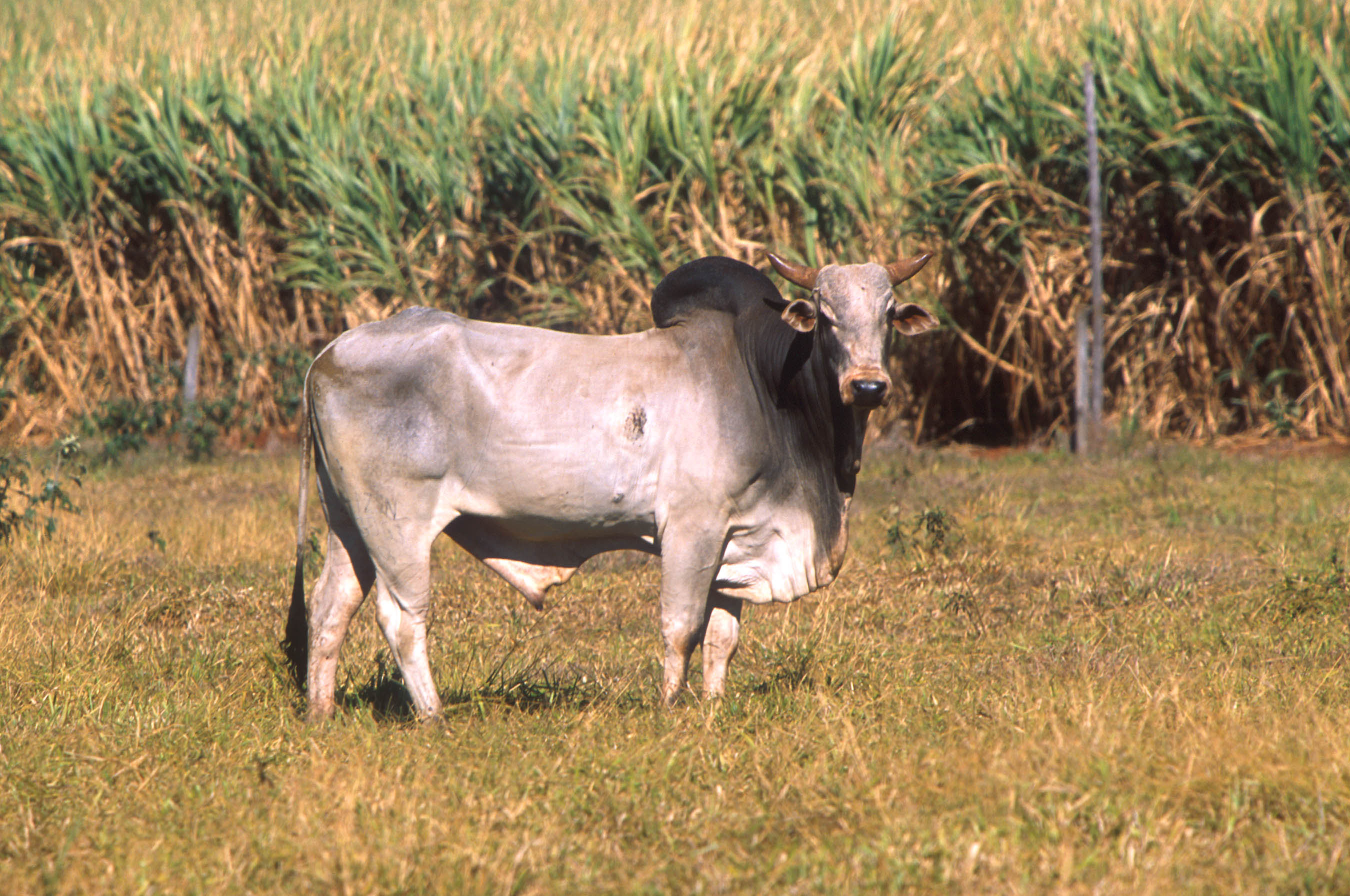
A zebu bull

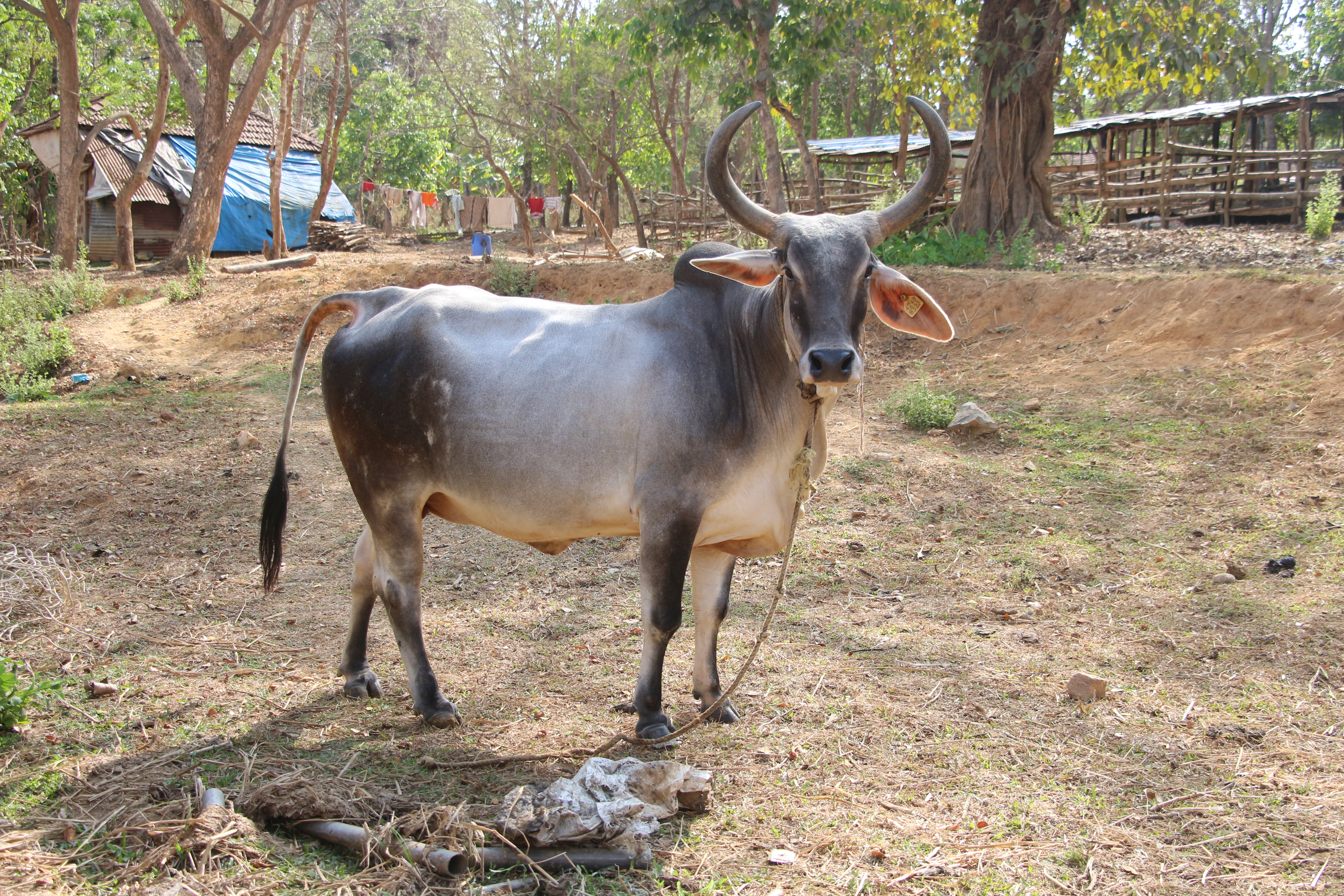
Female zebu of Kankrej breed from Gujarat, India

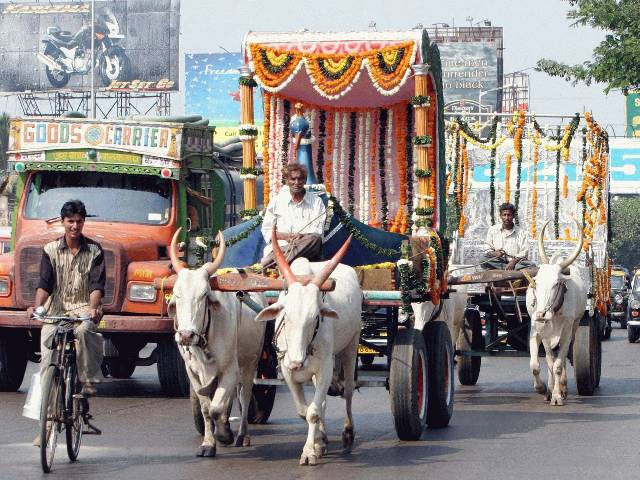
Draft zebu pulling a cart in Mumbai, India (2004)

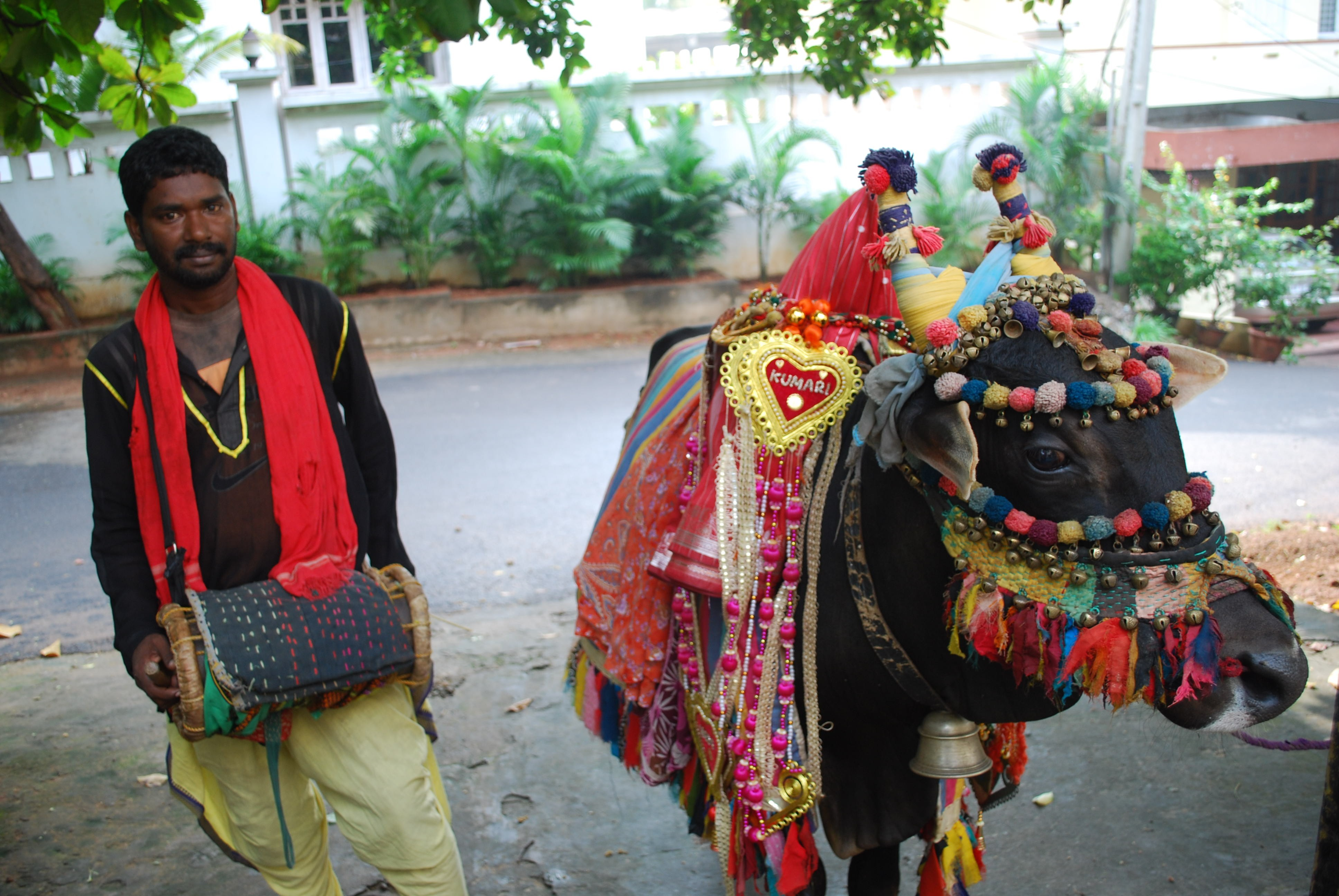
A villager with a decorated bull during Pongal festival

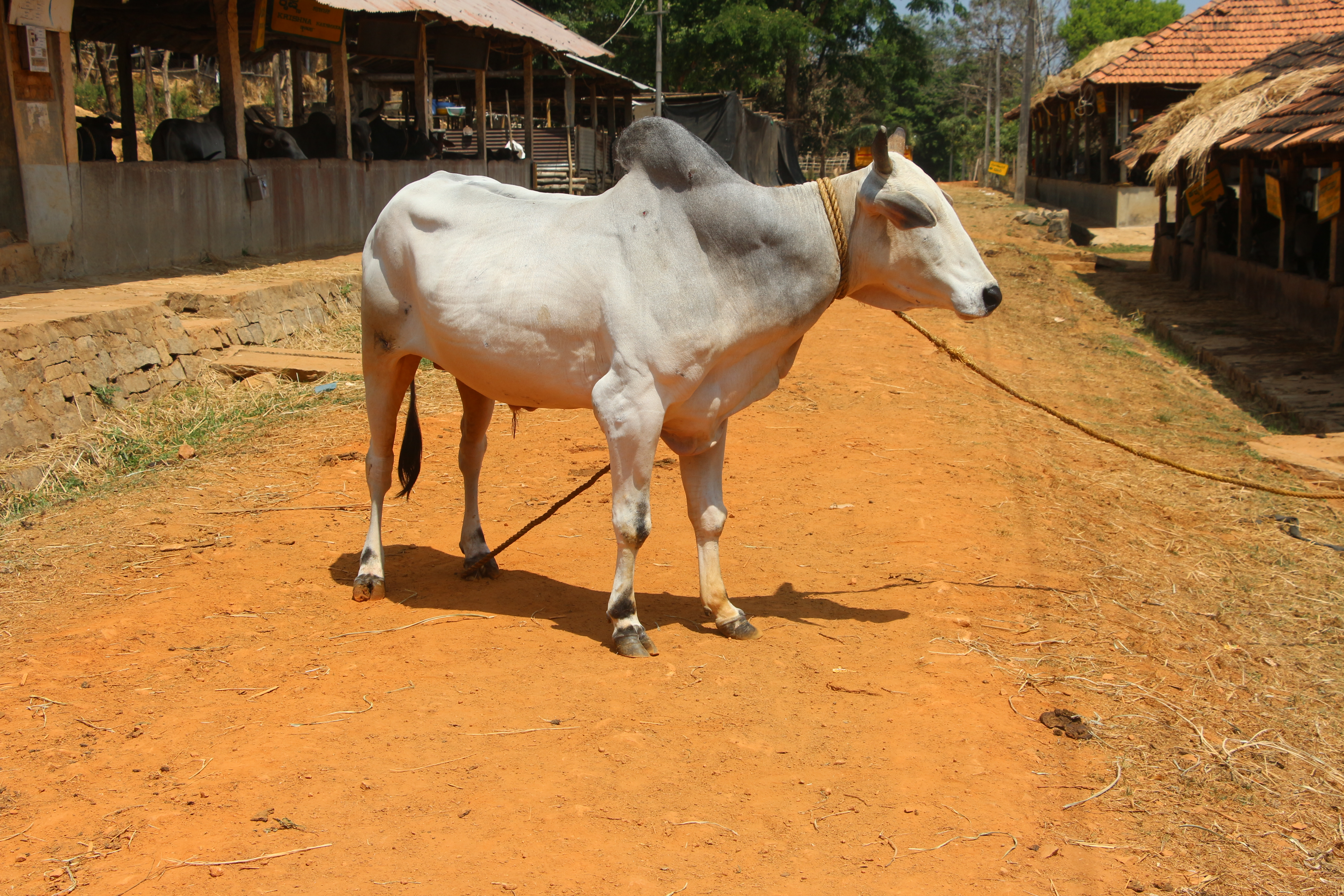
Hariana breed of zebu type cattle in north India

A zebu at the at Beijing Wildlife Park, China

== See also ==
- List of Indian cattle breeds
- List of animals with humps
- List of cattle breeds
- Ubre Blanca
