= List of Indian cattle breeds =

This is a list of the cattle breeds considered in India to be wholly or partly of Indian origin. Some may have complex or obscure histories, so inclusion here does not necessarily imply that a breed is predominantly or exclusively Indian. Cows from these breeds are often called Desi cows.^{[5]}

== Breeds ==
Local name	Other names	Notes	Image
Alambadi^{[1]}^{[4]}		Tamil Nadu	
Amrit Mahal^{[1]}^{[4]}	Amritmahal	Karnataka^{[2]}	
Bachaur^{[1]}^{[4]}		Bihar^{[2]}	
Badri^{[2]}		Uttarakhand^{[2]}	
Bargur^{[1]}^{[4]}		Tamil Nadu^{[2]}	
Belahi^{[2]}		Haryana, Chandigarh^{[2]}	
Bengali^{[1]}			
Binjharpuri^{[1]}^{[4]}		Orissa^{[2]}	
Brownsind^{[1]}		Allahabad; composite of Red Sindhi and Brown Swiss	
Cutchi^{[1]}	Kachhi	Cutch, north-western Gujarat	
Dangi^{[1]}^{[4]}		Maharashtra, Madhya Pradesh^{[2]}	
Deoni^{[1]}		Maharashtra, Karnataka^{[2]}	
Devarakota^{[1]}		Tamil Nadu, regional variant of Ongole	
Devni^{[1]}		Osmanabad, Maharashtra	
Frieswal^{[1]}		composite breed	
Gangatiri^{[1]}^{[4]}	Shahabadi	Uttar Pradesh, Bihar^{[2]}	
Gaolao^{[1]}^{[4]}		Maharashtra, Madhya Pradesh^{[2]}	
Ghumusari^{[1]}^{[4]}	Goomsur;^{[3]} Ghumsuri^{[4]}	Orissa^{[2]}	
Gir^{[1]}^{[4]}		Gujarat^{[2]}	
Goomsur^{[1]}	see Ghumusari		
Gujamavu^{[1]}		variant of Hallikar^{[3]}	
Hallikar^{[1]}^{[4]}		Karnataka^{[2]}	
Hariana^{[1]}^{[4]}		Haryana, Uttar Pradesh, Rajasthan^{[2]}	
Hissar^{[1]}	Hansi-hissar; Hissar-hansi; Hissar-hariana; Hansi^{[1]}	southern Punjab	
Jellicut^{[1]}	see Pulikulam		
Jersind^{[1]}		Allahabad; composite of Red Sindhi and Jersey	
Kangayam^{[1]}^{[4]}		Tamil Nadu^{[2]}	
Kankrej^{[1]}^{[4]}		Gujarat, Rajasthan^{[2]}	
Kappiliyan^{[1]}	see Jellicut		
Karan Fries^{[1]}		composite of Tharparkar and Friesian	
Karan Swiss^{[1]}		composite of Sahiwal and Brown Swiss	
Kasaragod^{[3]}		Kerala^{[3]}	
Kenkatha^{[1]}^{[4]}		Uttar Pradesh, Madhya Pradesh^{[2]}	
Khamala^{[1]}		Betul, southern Madhya Pradesh	
Khariar^{[1]}		Orissa^{[2]}	
Khasi^{[1]}	Assam Hill; Assam Plain	Assam, north-eastern states; variant of Bengali	
Kherigarh^{[1]}^{[4]}		Uttar Pradesh^{[2]}	
Khillari^{[1]}^{[4]}		Maharashtra, Karnataka^{[2]}	
Kosali^{[2]}		Chhattisgarh^{[2]}	
Krishnagiri^{[1]}		Tamil Nadu	
Krishna Valley^{[1]}^{[4]}	Kistna Valley	Karnataka^{[2]}	
Kumauni^{[1]}^{[4]}		northern Uttar Pradesh	
Ladakhi^{[1]}^{[4]}		Kashmir	
Lakhimi^{[1]}^{[2]}		Assam	
Malnad Gidda^{[1]}^{[4]}		Karnataka^{[2]}	
Malvi^{[1]}^{[4]}		Madhya Pradesh^{[2]}	
Mampati^{[1]}^{[4]}		Madhya Pradesh	
Manapari^{[1]}^{[4]}		Tamil Nadu	
Mewati^{[1]}^{[4]}		Rajasthan, Haryana, Uttar Pradesh^{[2]}	
Mhaswad^{[1]}		variant of Khillari	
Motu^{[1]}^{[4]}	Deshi	Orissa, Chhattisgarh, Andhra Pradesh^{[2]}	
Nagori^{[1]}^{[4]}		Rajasthan^{[2]}	
Nakali^{[1]}		variant of Khillari	
Nimari^{[1]}^{[4]}	Khargoni; Khurgoni; Khargaon	Madhya Pradesh^{[2]}	
Ongole^{[1]}^{[4]}		Andhra Pradesh^{[2]}	
Ponwar^{[1]}^{[4]}		Uttar Pradesh^{[2]}	
Pulikulam^{[1]}^{[4]}	Jellicut; Kilakattu; Kilkad; Kilakad	Tamil Nadu^{[2]}	
Punganur^{[1]}^{[4]}		Andhra Pradesh^{[2]}	
Purnea^{[1]}	Red Purnea^{[4]}	north-eastern Bihar	
Ramgarhi^{[1]}		east Mandla, Madhya Pradesh	
Rathi^{[1]}^{[4]}		eastern Rajasthan^{[2]}	
Red Kandhari^{[1]}^{[4]}	Lakhalbunda	Maharashtra^{[2]}	
Red Sindhi^{[1]}^{[2]}^{[4]}	Malir; Sindhi; Red Karachi		
Sahiwal^{[1]}^{[4]}		Punjab, Rajasthan^{[2]}	
Sanchori^{[1]}	Marwari	Jodhpur, Rajasthan; variant of Kankrej	
Shahabadi^{[1]}^{[4]}	see Gangatiri		
Siri^{[1]}^{[4]}	Trahbum	Sikkim, West Bengal^{[2]}	
Son Valley^{[1]}		Madhya Pradesh	
Sunandini^{[1]}		Kerala; composite of local zebuine stock and Brown Swiss	
Tarai^{[1]}^{[4]}			
Taylor^{[1]}		Patna, Bihar; composite of local zebuine stock with Shorthorn and Channel Island stock	
Tharparkar^{[1]}^{[4]}	Grey Sindhi; White Sindhi; Thari	Rajasthan^{[2]}	
Thillari^{[1]}	Tapti; Tapi		
Tho Tho^{[1]}^{[3]}^{[4]}		Nagaland	
Umblachery^{[1]}^{[4]}	Mottai Madu; Southern; Tanjore; Therkuthi Madu	Tamil Nadu^{[2]}	
Vechur^{[1]}^{[4]}		Kerala^{[2]}	

== See also ==
- Indian Agricultural Research Institute
- Indigenous cattle breeds of India
- Government Livestock Farm, Hisar
- National Dairy Research Institute
