= Indigenous cattle breeds of India =

Of the more than 800 cattle breeds recognized worldwide, India had 27 acknowledged indigenous breeds of cattle and 7 breeds of buffalo. As of 2018 the ICAR recognized 50 breeds that are indigenous in India, of which two cattle breeds and three buffalo breeds were added in 2018. Local conservation programs are endeavouring to maintain the purity of breeds such as Tharparkar, dwarf cattle such as Kasaragod, and Kankrej, Amrit Mahal and Kangayam. On the basis of main uses, Indigenous cattle breeds are classified in to milch (cow and buffaloes for milk), draft (load carrying such as ox), and dual purpose (i.e. milk and draft).

== All India livestock census (in thousands) ==
Exotic/Crossbred	2007	2012	% change
Male	6,844	5,971	-12.75
Female	26,216	33,760	28.78
Total	33,060	39,732	20.18

Indigenous	2007	2012	% change
Male	76,779	61,949	-19.32
Female	89,236	89,224	-0.01
Total	1,66,015	1,51,172	-8.94

== Indigenous cattle breeds of India ==
Total population and breeds of indigenous cattle of India are as follows:

S No	Breed	Image	Region of origin	Type	Related cattle breed	Description
1	Alambadi		Alambadi, Dharmapuri district, Tamil Nadu	draught		
2	Amritmahal		Hassan, Chikmagalur and Chitradurga district, Karnataka.	draught		
3	Gir		Gir forest region and surrounding districts, Saurashtra region, Gujarat	milch	Bhadawari, Desan, Gujarati, Kathiawari, Sorthi, and Surati. Gyr - Brazil,	
4	Red Sindhi		Karachi and Hyderabad (Pakistan) regions of undivided India	milch	Red Karachi, Sindhi and Mahi	
5	Sahiwal		Montgomery District of undivided India	milch	Lola (loose skin), Lambi Bar, Montgomery, Multani, Teli. Australian Milking Zebu, Australian Friesian Sahiwal.	Best indigenous dairy breed.
6	Bargur		Bargur forest hills, Anthiyur Taluk, Erode District, Western Tamil Nadu	draught		
7	Hallikar		Mysore, Mandya, Hassan and Tumkur districts, South Karnataka	draught		
8	Kangayam		Kangeyam, Tiruppur district, Tamil Nadu	draught		
9	Pulikulam		Cumbum Valley, Madurai district, Tamil Nadu.	draught		
10	Khillari cattle		Satara, Kolhapur and Sangli regions, Maharashtra and Bijapur, Dharwad and Belgaum districts, Karnataka	draught		
11	Umblachery		Thanjavur, Tamil Nadu	draught		
12	Deoni		Bidar district, Karnataka and Latur district, Maharashtra	milch, draught		
13	Hariana		Rohtak, Karnal, Jind, Hissar, and Gurgaon districts, Haryana and eastern Punjab	milch, draught		
14	Kankrej		Banaskantha, Gujarat	milch, draught	Guzerat, Brazil	
15	Krishna Valley		Southern border of Maharashtra and Andhra Pradesh	milch, draught		
16	Ongole		Prakasam District, Andhra Pradesh	milch, draught	Nelore, Brazil	
17	Tharparkar		Tharparkar District in Sindh province in Pakistan.	milch, draught	Karan Fries	
18	Bachaur		Madhubani, Darbhanga and Sitamarhi, north Bihar	draught		
19	Dangi		Nasik and Ahmednagar districts, Maharashtra	draught		
20	Kasaragod		Kasaragod district, Kerala			
21	Kenkatha / Kenwariya		Bundelkhand, Uttar Pradesh and banks of river Ken and Vindhyas hilly range, Madhya Pradesh	draught		
22	Kherigarh		Lakhimpur Kheri district, Uttar Pradesh	draught		
23	Malenadu Gidda		Coastal and hilly areas of Karnataka			
24	Malvi		Malwa plateau, Western Madhya Pradesh	draught		
25	Mewati / Kosi		Mewat, Haryana	milch		
26	Nagori		Nagaur district, Rajasthan	draught		appreciated for fast road work.
27	Nimari		Narmada valley, Madhya Pradesh and Jalgaon district, Maharashtra			
28	Ponwar		Pilbhit, Uttar Pradesh			
29	Rathi		Rajasthan	milch, draught		
30	Red Kandhari		Latur, Kandhar taluk in Nanded district and Parbhani district, Maharashtra and North Karnataka			
31	Siri		Parts of Sikkim, Darjeeling and Bhutan	draught		
32	Vechur		Kerala			
33	Motu		Orissa, Chhattisgarh and Andhra Pradesh			
34	Ghumusari		Orissa			
35	Binjharpuri		Orissa			
36	Khariar		Orissa			
37	Pulikulam		Tamilnadu			
38	Kosali		Chhattisgarh			
39	Belahi		Haryana and Chandigarh			
40	Gangatiri		Uttar Pradesh and Bihar			
41	Badri		Uttarakhand			
42	Lakhimi		Assam			
43	Ladakhi		Jammu and Kashmir			
44	Konkan Kapila		Maharashtra and Goa			

== Newly registered cattle breeds of India ==
ICAR-National Bureau of Animal Genetic Resources, Karnal (NBAGR) is the nodal agency for the registration of newly identified germplasm of Cattle are:

S No	Breed	Image	Region of origin	Type	Related cattle breed	Description
1	Poda Thurpu		Nagarkurnool of Telangana	Draught purpose		
2	Nari		Sirohi and Pali districts of Rajasthan, Sabarkantha and Banaskantha districts Gujarat	Dual purpose (Milch and Draught)		
3	Dagri		Dahod, Chhota Udaipur and parts of Mahisagar, Panchmahal and Narmada district Gujarat	Draught purpose		
4	Thutho		Nagaland	Draught and Meat purpose		
5	Shweta Kapila		North Goa and South Goa districts of Goa			
6	Himachali Pahari		Kullu, Chamba, Mandi, Kangra, Sirmaur, Shimla, Kinnaur, Lahul & Spiti districts of Himachal Pradesh	Draught purpose		
7	Purnea		Araria, Purnea and Katihar districts; and the Adjoining areas of Kishanganj, Supaul and Madhepura districts of Bihar	Dual purpose (Milch and Draught)		

== Indigenous buffalo breeds of India ==
Total population and indigenous buffalo breed of India are as follows:

== Buffalo Population in India (in million) ==
The total Buffalo Population in the country was 109.85 million in 2019. Total Buffalo has increased by 1.1% over the previous Livestock Census (2012). The Female Buffalo Population increased by 8.61% whereas the Male Buffalo is declined by 42.35% over the previous census. About 20.5% of the total livestock is contributed by buffaloes.

Buffalo	2007	2012	2019
Male	19.59	16.10	9.28
Female	85.74	92.60	100.57
Total	105.34	108.70	109.85

== Registered Buffalo breed of india ==
There are 19 registered Buffalo breeds in India under ICAR - NBAGR are as follows

S No	Breed	Image	Region of origin	Type	Related cattle breed	Description
1	Banni					
2	Bhadawari		Agra and Etawah districts, Uttar Pradesh and Gwalior district, Madhya Pradesh.			
3	Jaffrabadi		Gir forests, Kutch and Jamnagar districts, Gujarat.			known for its ability to fight lions in the Gir forest
4	Mehsana		Mehsana, Sabarkanda and Banaskanta districts, Gujarat and adjoining Maharashtra			evolved out of crossbreeding between the Surti and the Murrah.
5	Murrah		Rohtak, Hisar and Sind of Haryana, Nabha and Patiala districts, Punjab and the southern parts of Delhi		Delhi, Kundi and Kali.	
6	Nagpuri		Nagpur, Akola and Amravati districts, Maharashtra.		Elitchpuri, Barari.	
7	Nili Ravi		Sutlej valley in Ferozpur district, Punjab and in the Sahiwal (Pakistan)			
8	Surti		Kaira and Baroda district, Gujarat.		Deccani, Gujarati, Talabda, Charator and Nadiadi.	
9	Toda		Nilgiri Hills, South India			semi-wild breed.
10	Marathwadi		Maharashtra			
11	Pandharpuri		Maharashtra			
12	Chilika		Orissa			
13	Kalahandi		Orissa			
14	Luit (Swamp)		Assam and Manipur			
15	Bargur		Tamil Nadu			
16	Gojri		Pathankot, Gurdaspur, Hoshiarpur, Rupnagar and SAS Nagar (Mohali) districts of Punjab and Kangra and Chamba districts of Himachal Pradesh	Milk and draught purpose		Animals can travel long distances (seasonal migration) and can climb easily on hill tops for grazing. Used for both milk and draught power (ploughing and other agricultural operations).
17	Dharwad		Bagalkot, Belagavi, Dharwad, Gadag, Ballari, Bidar, Vijayapura, Chitradurga, Kalaburgi, Haveri, Koppal, Raichur and Yadgir districts of Karnataka	Milk purpose		The milk from this buffalo is used for the preparation of the famous Dharwad Peda with a GI tag.
18	Manda		Koraput, Malkangiri and Nawarangapur districts of Odisha	Draught, milk and manure		Manda buffaloes are reared mostly under an extensive system. Both males and females are used for agricultural operations.
19	Chhattisgarhi		Chhattisgarh			

== See also ==
- Animal welfare and rights in India
- Dairy in India
- Fauna of India
- List of endangered animals in India
- List of Indian cattle breeds
- List of Indian state animals
- List of veterinary universities and colleges in India
- Wildlife of India
