= Khillari =

Khillari is a village in Maharashtra, India, known for:

- the Khillari cattle, a cattle breed variety, originating from Khillari
- having been the epicenter of the 1993 Latur earthquake, also known as the "Khillari earthquake"
