= Nakali =

Nakali may refer to:

- Nakali ape, or Nakalipithecus, an extinct species of great ape from Nakali, Kenya
- Nakali Khillari (literally: "false Khillari" or "imitation Khillari"), a cattle breed variety, originating in India
- the mystical world of Nakali, in the 2026 American animated film Forgotten Island
