= Badri (cattle) =

Breed of cattle

- Other names: Pahadi
- Country of origin: India
- Distribution: Uttarakhand, specifically the Garhwal region
- Standard: Certified by ICAR's National Bureau of Animal Genetic Resources (NBAGR)
- Use: Milk production, agriculture

Traits
- Coat: Black, brown, red, white, gray
- Horn status: Curved upward and inward

Badri is an indigenous breed of cattle found in the Garhwal region of Uttarakhand, India. It is locally known as Pahadi due to its adaptation to the hilly terrain of the region. It derives its name from Badrinath Temple, a Hindu temple in Uttarakhand. Badri has become the first cattle breed in Uttarakhand to receive certification from the ICAR's National Bureau of Animal Genetic Resources (NBAGR). As of 2022, the population of Badri cows in Uttarakhand is estimated to be around 700,000, with approximately 479,000 of them being female.

The cattle are primarily used for milk production and agricultural purposes, with the milk being rich in A2 proteins, which is considered healthier than A1 proteins found in some other breeds.

== History ==
In 1988, a conservation initiative for Badri cattle began at the Animal Breeding Farm in Nariyalgaon, Champawat, which covers an area of 127 acres.

In 2011, Trivendra Singh Rawat, the then Minister of Animal Husbandry of Uttarakhand, renamed the local breed of cows as Badri during a visit to Champawat. In 2012, a cattle breeding center was established in Nariyal village, Champawat, as part of an initiative to conserve and promote this indigenous breed, which has 137 Badri cows as of July 2016. The Badri cow was officially recognized as an indigenous cattle breed by the Department of Agricultural Research in August 2016.

In November 2022, officials from Uttarakhand's animal husbandry department proposed using sex-sorted semen technology and embryo transfer methods to improve the genetic quality and production of Badri cattle. These proposals were presented during a session with Chief Minister Pushkar Singh Dhami and state officials.

== Characteristics ==
Badri cattle are relatively small in size, with varied coat colors ranging from black, brown, red, and white to gray. The horns of Badri cows are curved upward and inward, which helps them navigate the rough and uneven terrain of the hills.
