= Belahi (cattle) =

Breed of cattle

- Other names: Morni, Desi cattle
- Country of origin: India
- Distribution: Haryana, Punjab, Himachal Pradesh, Uttarakhand, Chandigarh
- Use: Milk production, draft power

Traits
- Weight: Female: 250–300 kg
- Height: Male: 131.13 cm; Female: 120.33 cm
- Coat: Reddish-brown, gray, or white with white face and extremities
- Horn status: Sickle-shaped, curving upward and inward

Notes
- Traditionally reared by Gujjar pastoralists; migratory and maintained on low-input systems

The Belahi is a medium-sized breed of cattle native to the foothills of Haryana in North India. It is traditionally reared by Gujjar pastoralists, with its distribution extending to Punjab, Himachal Pradesh, Uttarakhand, and the Union Territory of Chandigarh. The breed is used for both milk production and draft power, particularly in agricultural activities on hilly terrains.

The Belahi breed is also referred to as Morni or Desi cattle. Its breeding area includes the Shivalik foothills in Haryana, specifically in the districts of Ambala, Panchkula, and Yamunanagar, as well as Chandigarh. The name Belahi refers to the mixed color patterns typical of this breed. These cattle are migratory by nature, maintained on low-input systems, and reared primarily by nomadic pastoralists.

== Characteristics ==
Belahi cattle are medium-sized animals with distinct physical features. The average height of cows is approximately 120.33 cm, while bulls stand at about 131.13 cm. The weight of the cows ranges from 250 to 300 kilograms. The cattle have different coat colors, usually seen in reddish-brown, gray, or white. Their heads are straight and broad, with a prominent poll, while their horns are sickle-shaped, curving upward and inward. The face and extremities are typically white, and some degree of white is often seen on the ventral part of the body. The humps range from small to medium in size, and the udders are of medium size.

== Milk ==
Belahi cows produce a moderate amount of milk, with an average yield of about 1014 kg per lactation. This can vary from 182 kg to 2092 kg. The milk has an average fat content of 5.25%, ranging from 2.37% to 7.89%.

== See also ==
- List of breeds of cattle
- Indigenous cattle breeds of India
