= Kasaragod Dwarf =

Breed of cattle

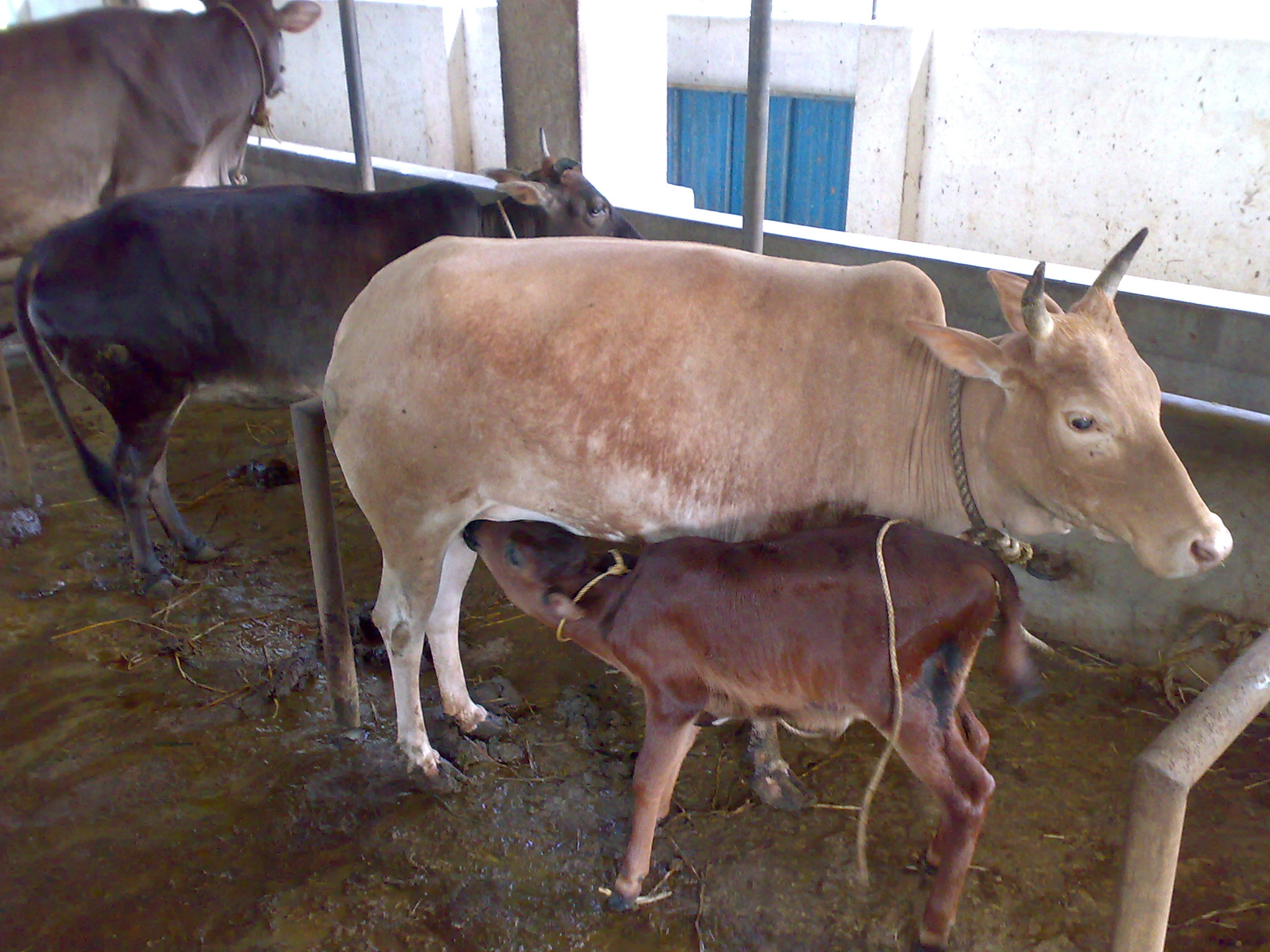
Kasaragod Dwarf, from Thiruvananthapuram

Kasaragod Dwarf is a breed of zebu (Bos indicus) cattle in Kerala. They originated in the mountain range of Kasaragod district. They grow to a height of 1 metre on average and are therefore easy to maintain. The cows are known for their high milking ability and give mineral rich milk with high feed to milk ratio. The cattle require almost zero inputs and can be free ranged. They are known for their intelligence and can find their way back to their homes after grazing. They are one among the four prime dwarf cattles in India along with Malnad Gidda, Punganur, and Vechur cattle.

== Characteristics ==
Height averages at 107.3 cms. for males and 95.83 cms. for females.

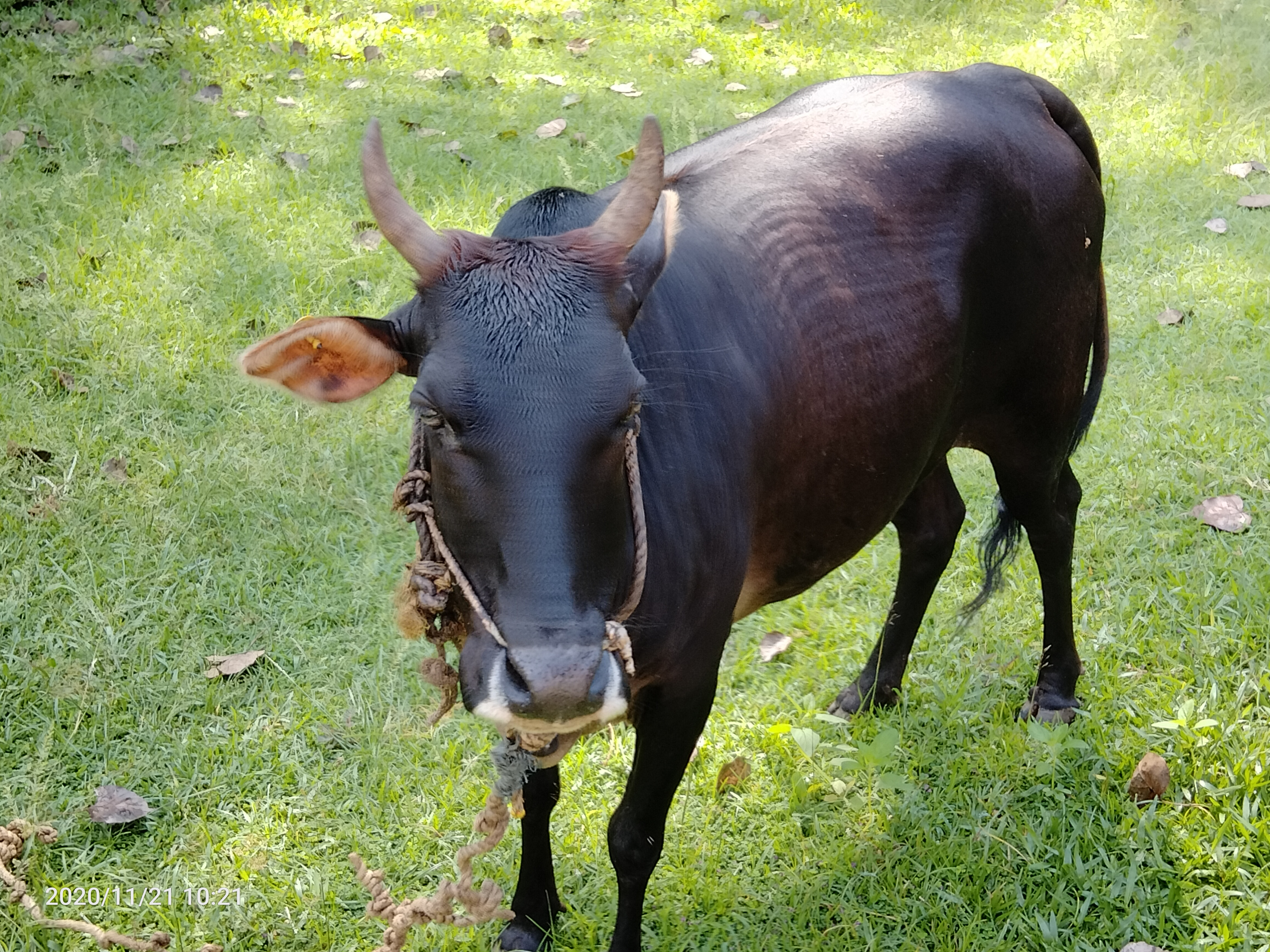
Cow

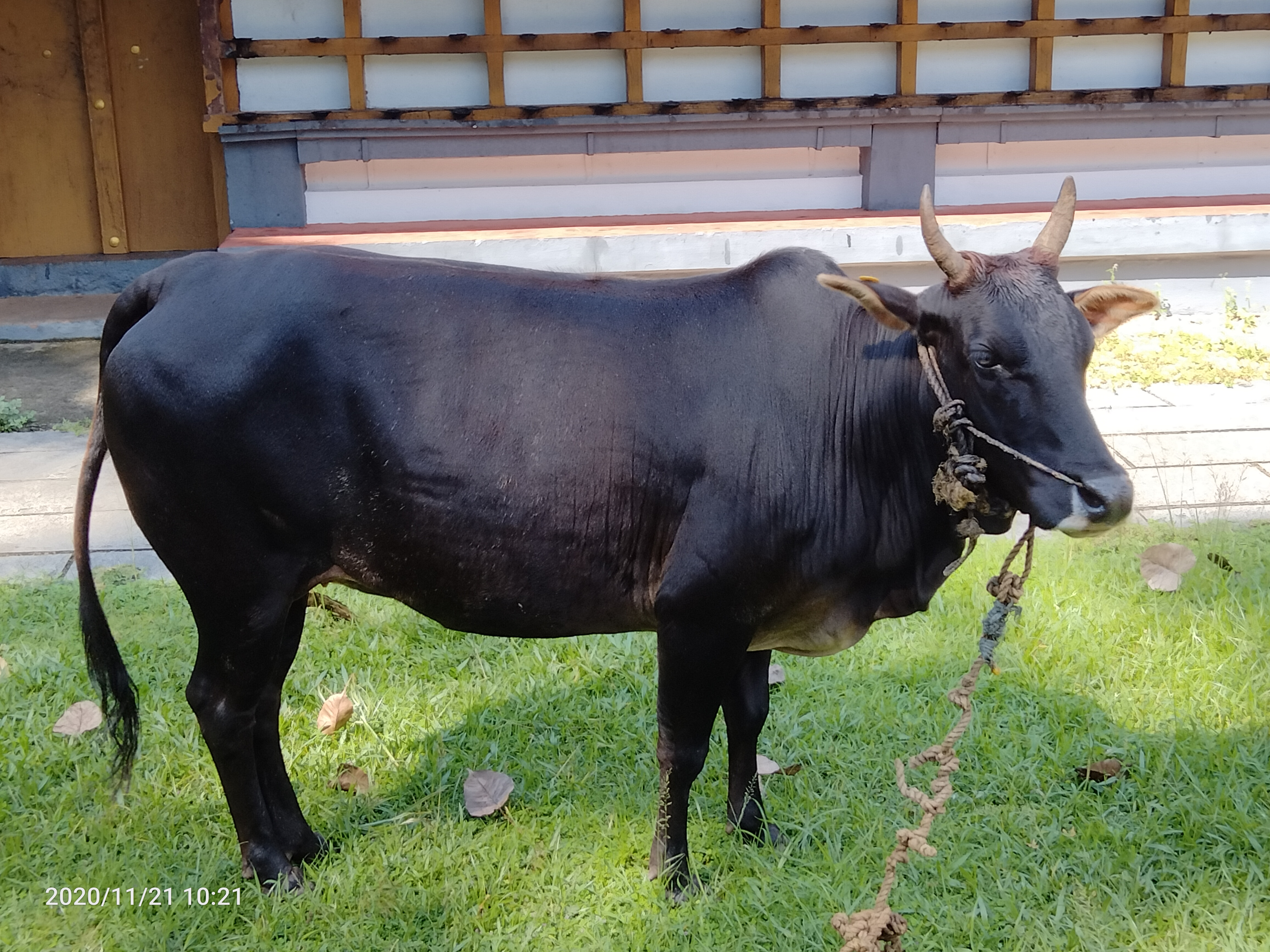
Cow

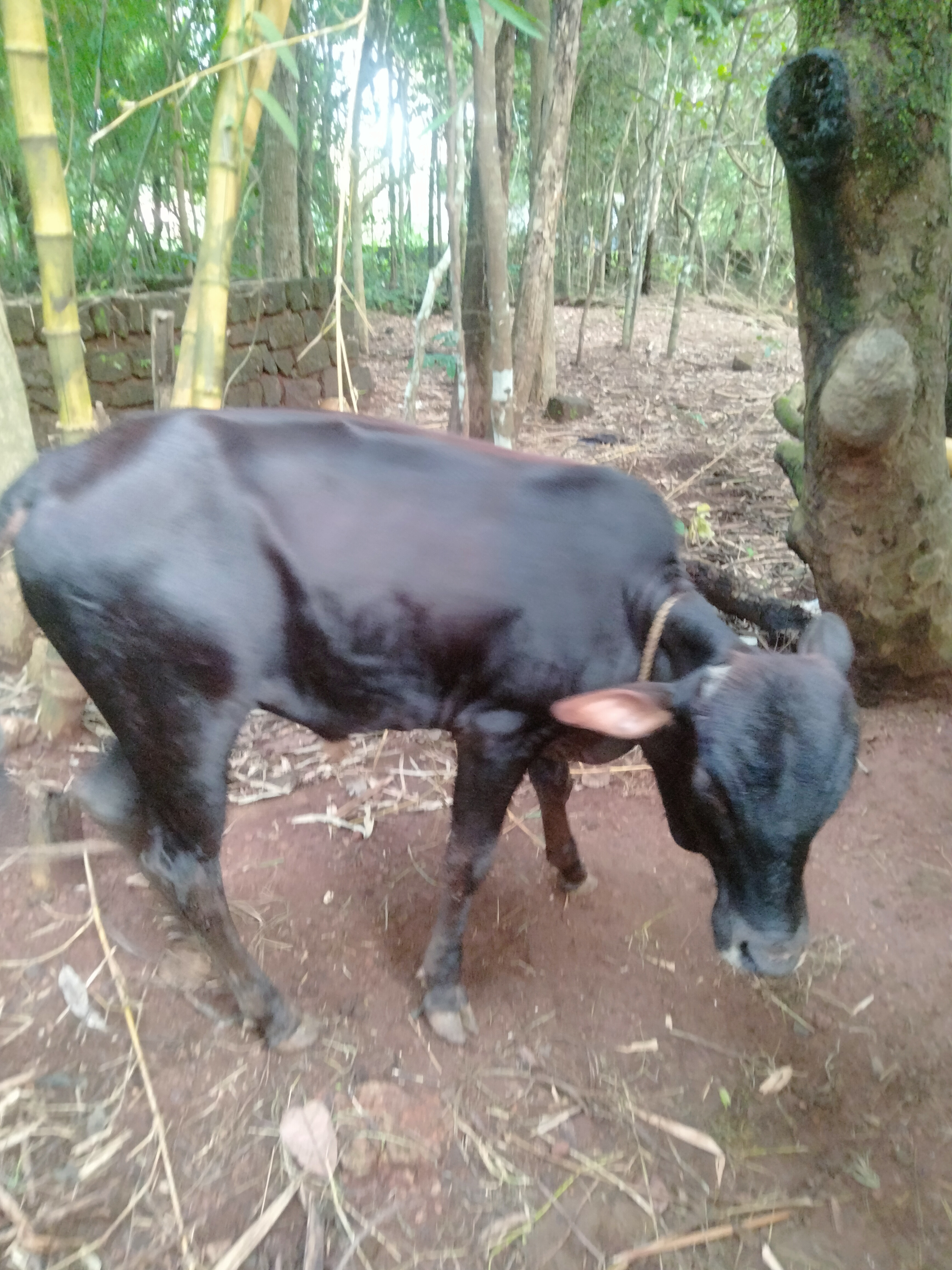
Bull

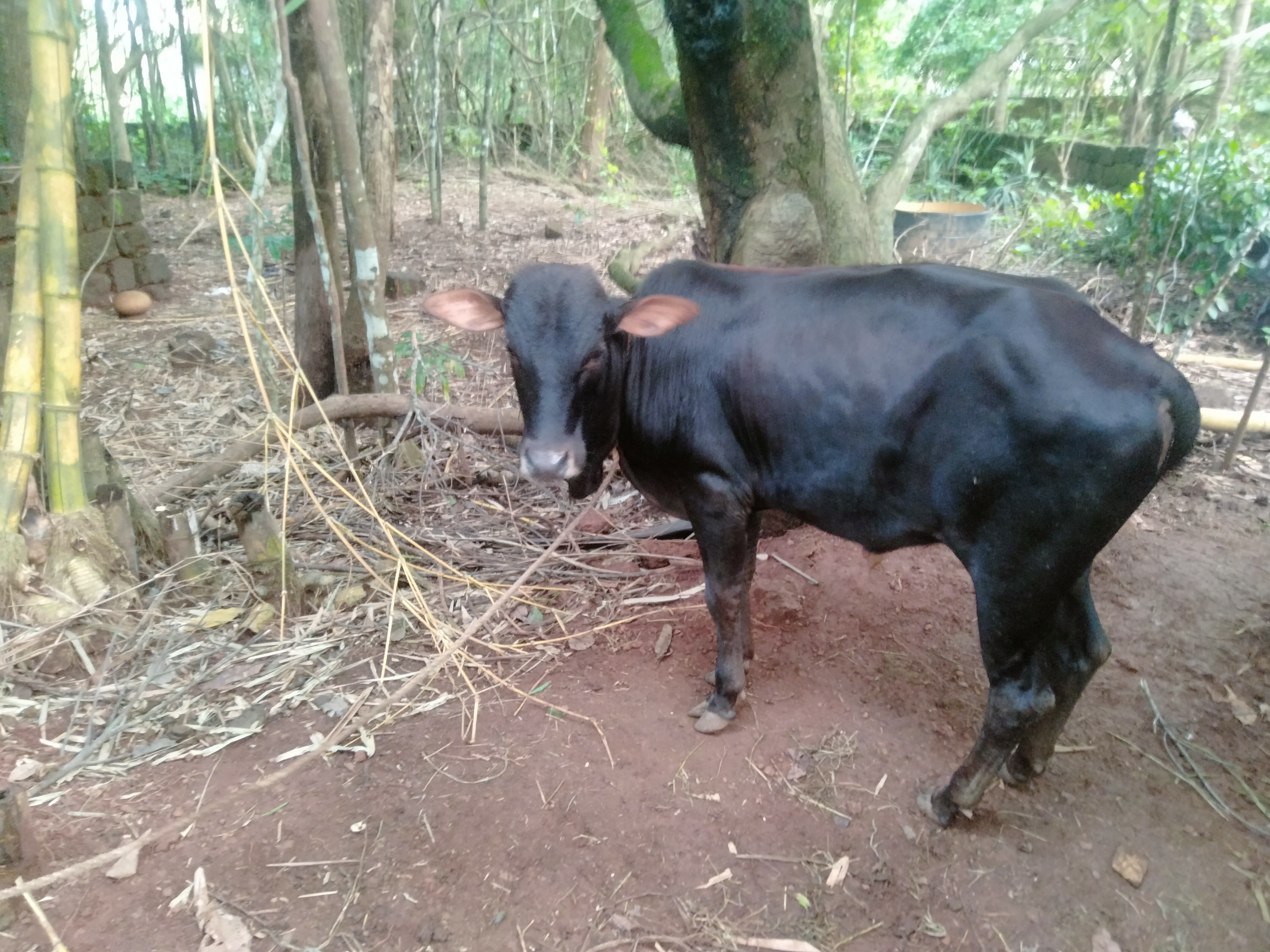
Bull
