= Bachaur cattle =

Breed of cattle

Bachaur is a breed of cattle native to India. The districts of Madhubani, Darbhanga and Sitamarhi in north Bihar i.e. Mithila region form the native tract of this breed. The animals are compact and small in size, and exhibit close similarity with Haryanvi cattle. The bulls are used for medium draft works and are adopted for pace. The cows are better milk yielders compared to other draught breeds of India and are well known for their regular breeding cycle. The cattle were reportedly widely popular in Bihar during the days of the English East India Company.

== See also ==
- List of cattle breeds
