= Hallikar =

Breed of cattle

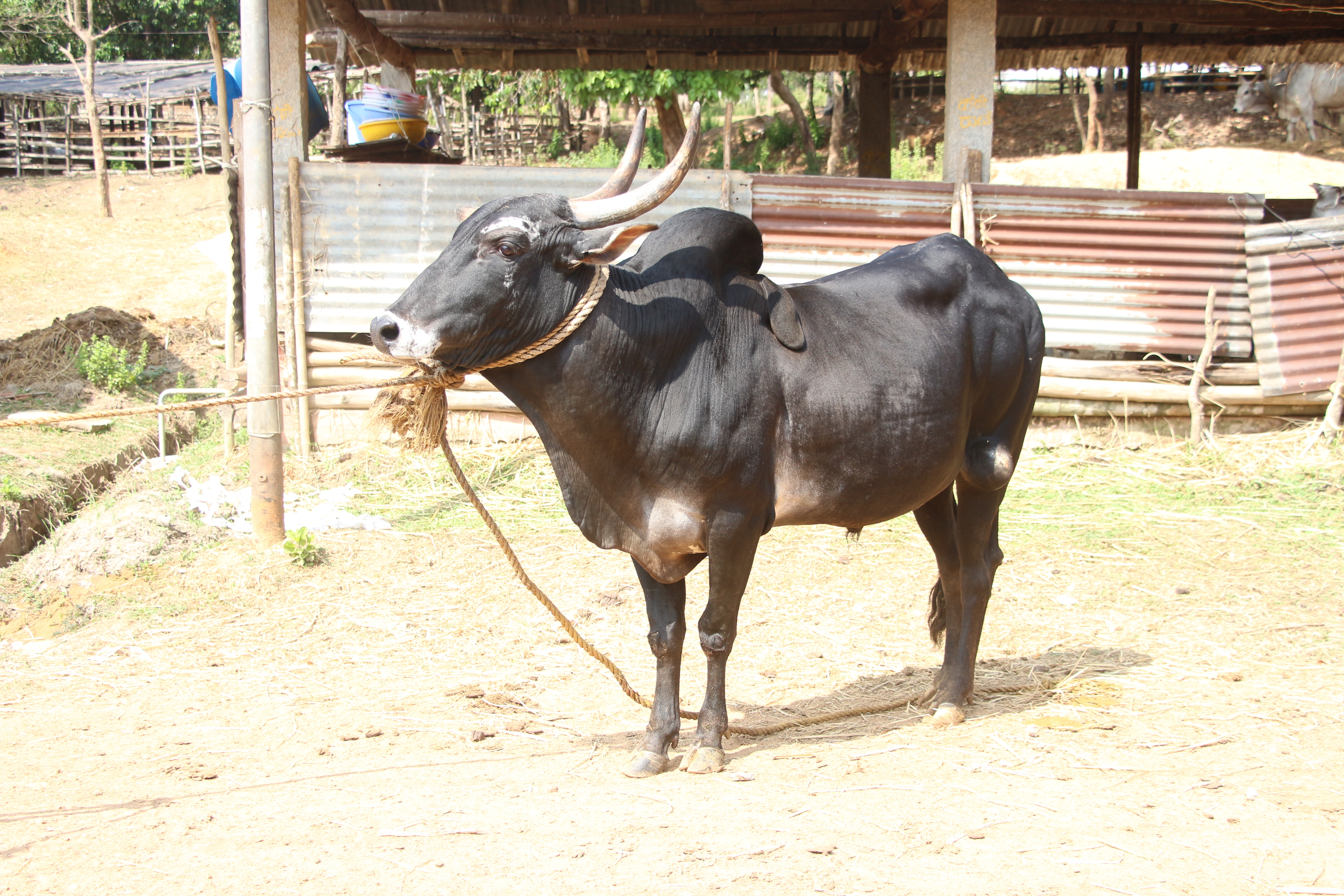
Hallikaru

Hallikar (Kannada: ಹಳ್ಳಿಕಾರ್) is a breed of cattle native to the state of Karnataka, India. It derives its name from the Hallikar community traditionally known for their cattle rearing. It is commonly found in the traditional Hallikar belt of Mysore, Mandya, Kolar, Hassan, Banglore rural and Tumkur districts of South Karnataka.

Hallikur bred from stud bulls in the Ramanagara, Magadi, and Kanakapura districts, are said to possess the original breed characteristics.

Long, vertical and backward bending horns, large humps in males, moderate to long height and medium size of the body, and white to grey and occasionally black complexions, are the characteristics of the breed. The bulls of this breed of cattle are known for their strength and endurance, and are mainly used for draft purposes. It is classified as a draught breed in India. Hallikar is classified as draught breed because in southern India, the cow was used for ploughing fields.

Sub-breeds of hallikars: most of them have GREY hair coat. (RUPAYEE BANNA)

1. Sooji - mallige hallikars.- seen in Ramanagara district. Sooji mallige Ox are the most beautiful, elegant among hallikars.
2. Bettadapura - seen in pandavapura, Mandya. These are shorter in height compared to other Hallikar sub-breeds
3. Gujamavu.
4. Amaravati - they have BROWN hair coat
5. Chintamani - they have BLACK hair coat

It is the only breed in the world where both ox and cow can be used in ploughing. Hallikar can work 18 to 20 hours a day and gives milk of 2 to 3 litres.

Present day uses:

1. cows for milk & breeding purpose, ploughing
2. stud bulls- breeding, bull race
3. Ox-ploughing, ox racing, ox show, religious procession.

Hallikars are known as “SEEMA” cows in the Rayala Seema region of Telangana.

Hallikars are also seen in Tamil Nadu-Karnataka border regions.

DODDI = Hallikars are still domesticated in hundreds in villages around forests in Karnataka, Tamil nadu borders.

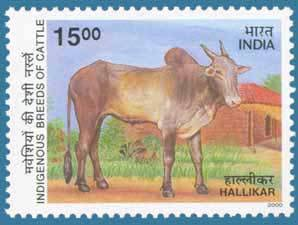
Commemorative stamp

It is one of the two breeds, along with Amrit Mahal, which have received the royal patronage and care from the erstwhile Maharajas of Mysore State through conservation and development. The breed is said to be the origin of Amrit Mahal cattle.

The Department of Posts, Government of India commemorated the breed by releasing a postage stamp in its name in 2000.

== See also ==
- List of cattle breeds
