= Rathi cattle =

Indian breed of cattle

Rathi
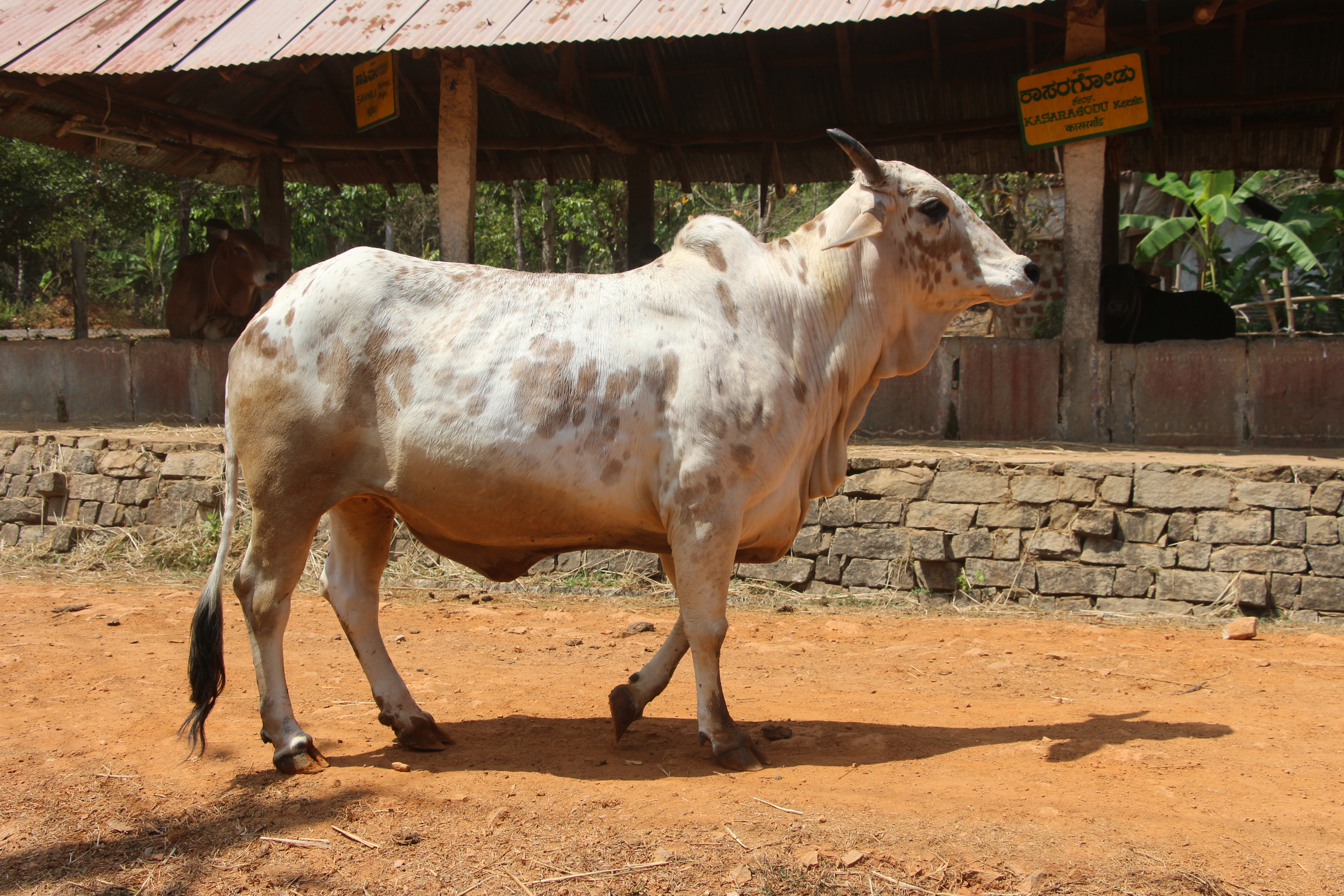
- Cow

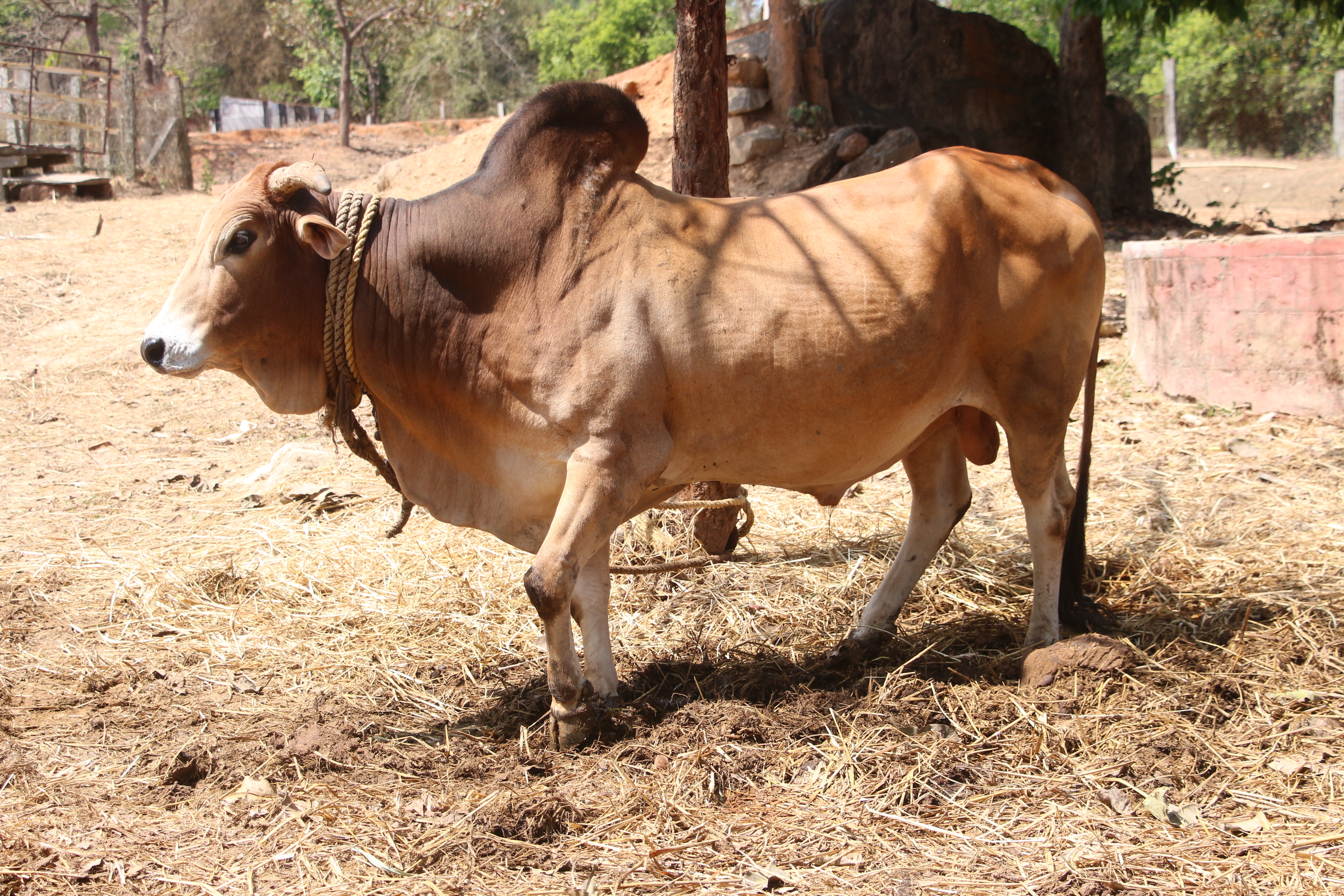
- Bull
- Conservation status: FAO (2007): not at risk; DAD-IS (2024): not at risk
- Country of origin: India
- Distribution: Thar Desert, Rajasthan
- Use: dairy

Traits
- Weight: Male: 386 kg; Female: 327 kg
- Height: Female: 115 cm
- Coat: usually brown with patches of white
- Cattle; Bos (primigenius) indicus

The Rathi (Hindi:राठी) is an Indian breed of dairy cattle. It originates in the state of Rajasthan, and is found principally in the Thar Desert, in the Bikaner, Ganganagar and Jaisalmer districts of the state. It is particularly numerous in the tehsil of Lunkaransar, in Bikaner District. In 2022 the total number of the cattle was estimated at 878852–1169828 head.

It is named for the nomadic Rath people of that area, who move with their cattle according to the available pasture and water resources, and depend on sales of cattle, ghee and milk for their living.

It is quite distinct from the white or grey Rath breed of draught cattle similar to the Hariana, described in 1909 and again in 1953 in the Alwar district of eastern Rajasthan – some 400 km from the range of the Rathi breed – for which no modern status data is available.

== Use ==
Milk yield is approximately 1530 kg in a lactation of 309 days; the milk has a fat content of 5.3%.
