= Nimari cattle =

Breed of cattle

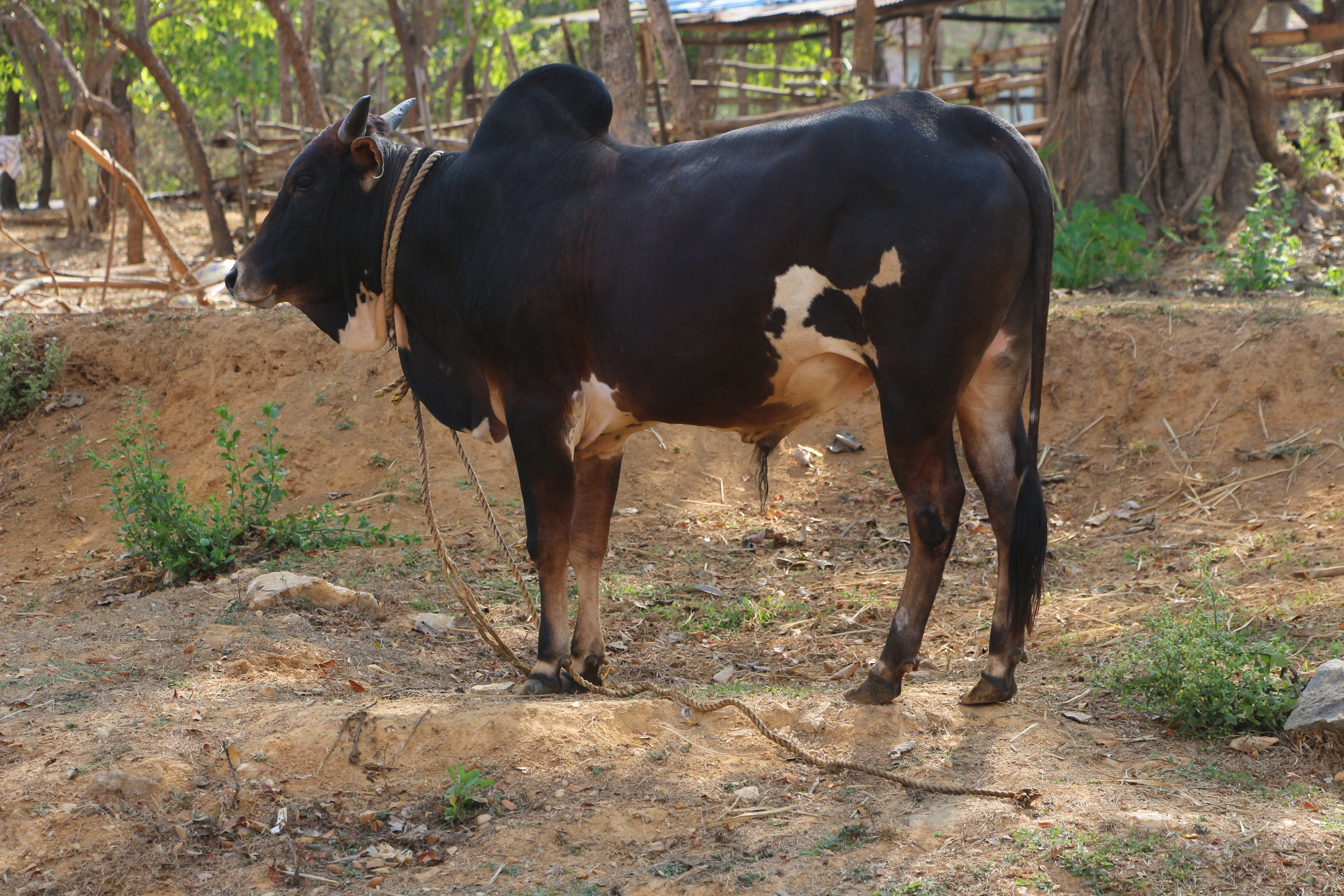
Nimari Bull

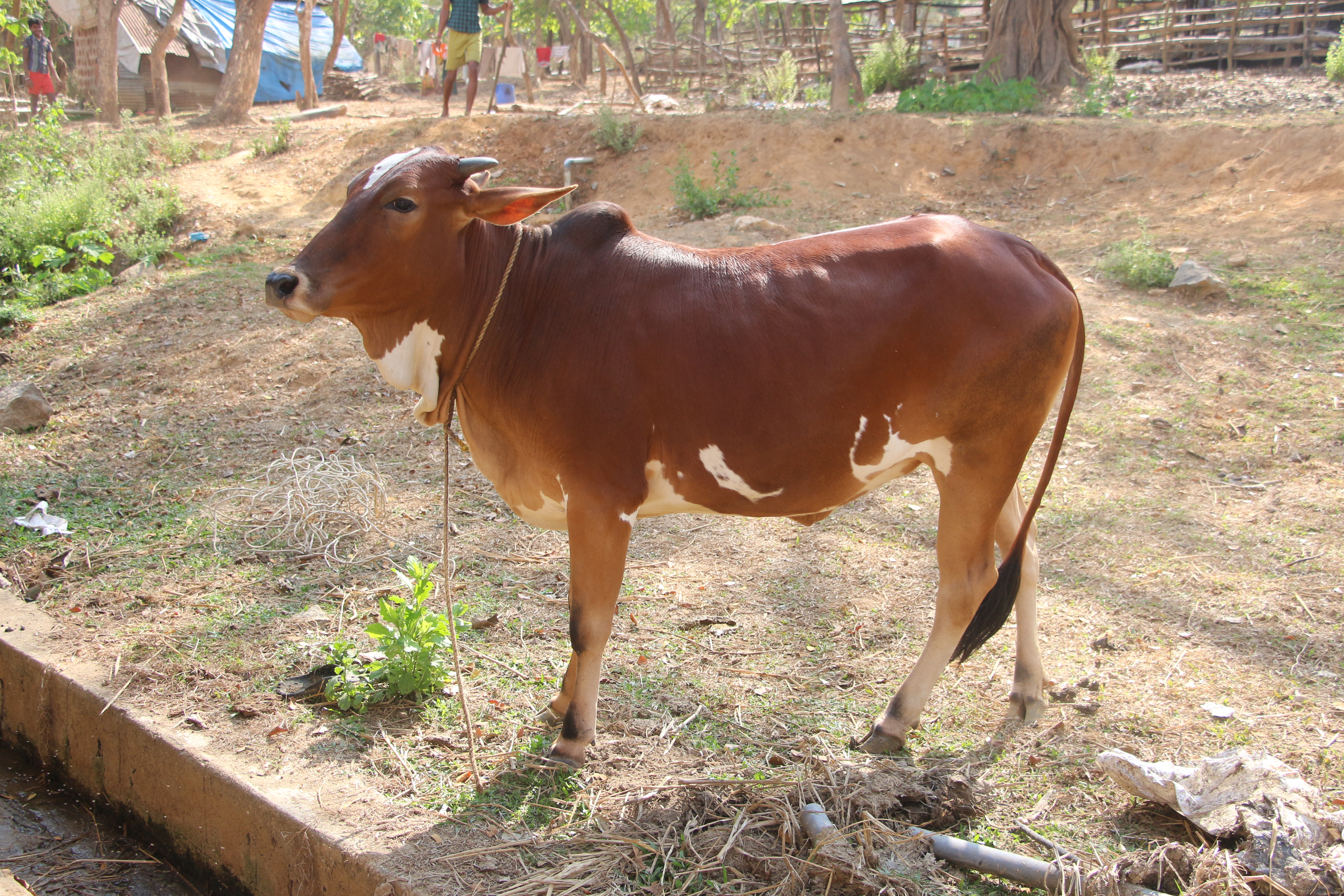
Nimari Cow

Nimari (Hindi:निमारि) is a breed of cattle native to the Nimar region of India. It originated out of Gyr (cattle) and Khillari cattle breeds, and is found in the regions of Narmada valley in the state of Madhya Pradesh and Jalgaon district in Maharashtra.

It is draught breed and cows are very average milk yielders. The cattle are of medium to large build and aggressive in temperament. Generally they are red in color, with skin interspersed with patches of white, well proportioned bodies that are straight and long, bulging forehead and graceful gait. The ears are not pendulous, but thick and protruding. The limbs are sturdy and straight with strong hooves, that can withstand rough terrain. Nimari cattle show a mixture of Gyr cattle and Khillari cattle(Tapi Valley strain) breeds, showing red coloration of Gir variety which have the habitat of Girnar. Starting from Barwani and Khargone districts of Madhya Pradesh, the breed spreads into Khandwa, and parts of Harda.
