= Mewati cattle =

Breed of cattle

Mewati, also known as Kosi, is an indigenous breed of cattle in India. They are named after Mewat region. They are known to be related to Gyr and Haryanvi cattle breeds. The cattle are almost universally white in colour with the rare occurrence of brown shades. It is considered to be a dual purpose breed with good milking and draft prowess. The bulls are known for their strength and endurance, and are employed for agricultural and carting purposes.

== See also ==
- List of breeds of cattle
