= Alambadi (cattle) =

Breed of cattle

- Country of origin: India
- Distribution: Tamil Nadu, Karnataka
- Use: dairy, draft

Traits
- Horn status: Horned
- Cattle; Bos (primigenius) indicus

Alambadi is a breed of cattle that originated in the southern state of Tamil Nadu in India.

In the past it was generally kept as a draught animal, although modern breeders are attempting to increase the milk output of this traditional breed. Alambadi breed is almost extinct and it is rare to find one. Farmers and breeders are complaining that the reason for the extinction of breed is due to the banning of bio-cultural sports like Raekla racing and usage of exotic foreign crossbred cows.

== See also ==
- List of breeds of cattle
