= Siri cattle =

Breed of cattle

Siri is a breed of cattle originating from Sikkim, Darjeeling and Bhutan and are of the Zebu family of cattle.

== Characteristics ==
They are often colored black and white or all black. Siri normally have a thick coat of long hair all year round. They are normally large compared to other types of cattle. They have horns which are sharp and long, if not cut. The position of the hump is slightly forward compared with that of other Zebu breeds. Strong legs and feet make the cattle useful for ploughing fields.

The cattle can survive in the mountains very well, owing to their long, powerful legs. Bulls can be very valuable as they are one of the strongest native breeds.
