= Punganur cattle =

Indian breed of cattle

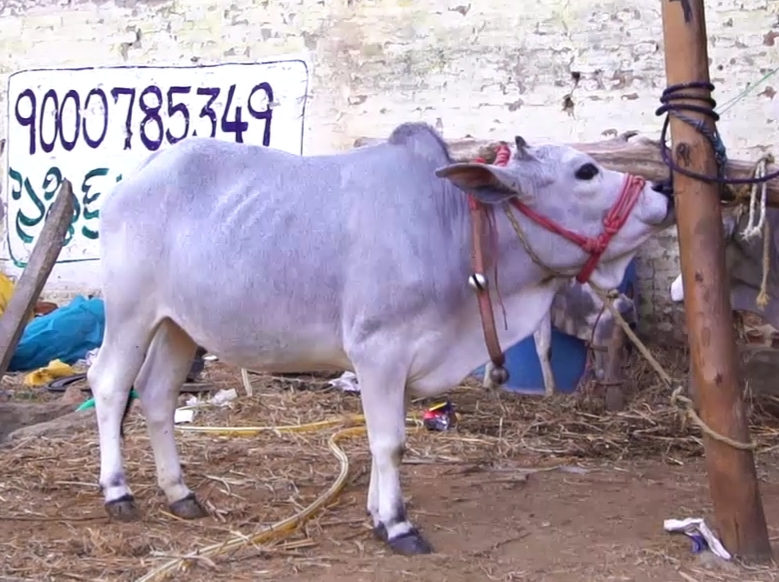
- Conservation status: FAO (2007): critical; DAD-IS (2024): not at risk
- Country of origin: India
- Distribution: Chitoor District, Andhra Pradesh

Traits
- Weight: Male: 240 kg; Female: 170 kg
- Height: Male: 107 cm; Female: 97 cm
- Coat: white, grey, brown, red, rarely black
- Horn status: small and crescent-shaped
- Cattle; Bos (primigenius) indicus

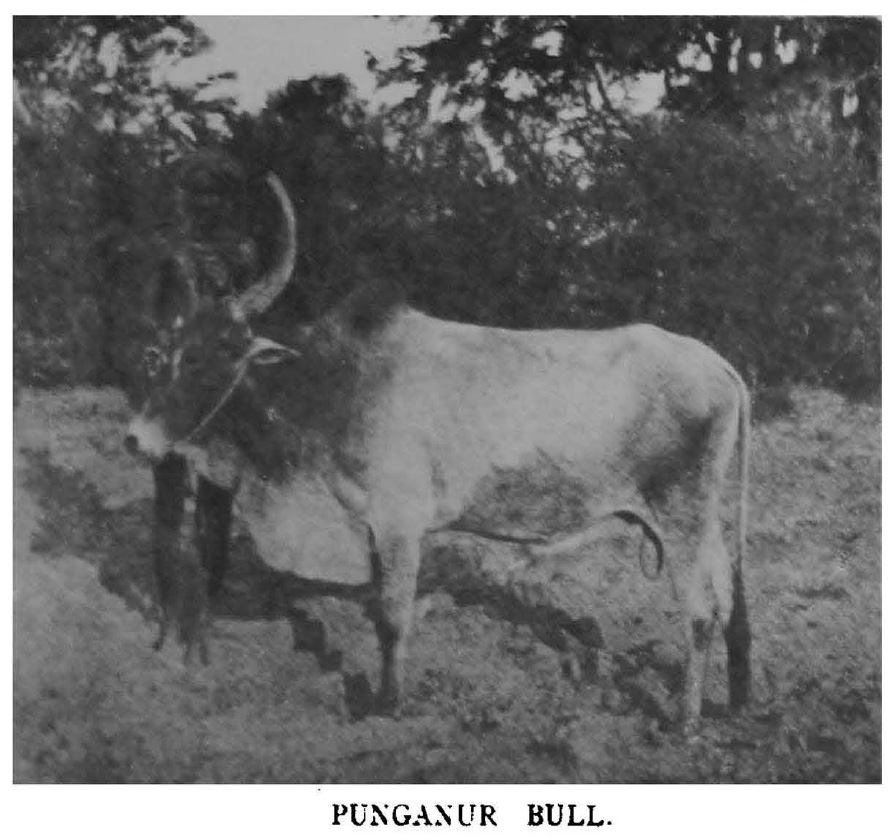
Punganur bull, image from 1887

The Punganur is an Indian breed of small zebuine cattle. It is found in the hilly area of Chitoor District, in Andhra Pradesh in southern India, and is among the smallest of all zebu breeds.

== History ==
The Punganur is a traditional breed of the Chitoor District of Andhra Pradesh in southern India. The breed name may derive from its association in the past with the Rajahs of Punganur, or from the name of the town itself. It is reared mainly in hill country, at up to 1500 m above sea level.

It has in the past been an endangered breed. An attempt was made in the 1950s to form a government conservation herd, but without success. Its conservation status was listed by the FAO as "critical" in 2007. In 2016 there was a herd of no more than 30 head on a government farm. In 2022 a population of 9876–13275 was reported to DAD-IS, and in 2024 the conservation status of the breed was listed as "not at risk".

== Characteristics ==
It is among the smallest of zebuine cattle breeds: bulls stand some 107 cm and weigh about 240 kg, cows average 97 cm in height and 170 kg in weight. The coat may be white, grey, brown, red, or rarely black. The horns are small and of crescent shape.

== Use ==
The cattle are used for draught power and for milk production. Milk yields and milk composition are highly variable; on average, cows give 546 kg of milk in a lactation of 263 days, or approximately 2.07 kg per day, with an average fat content of 5%.
