= Red Kandhari =

Breed of cattle

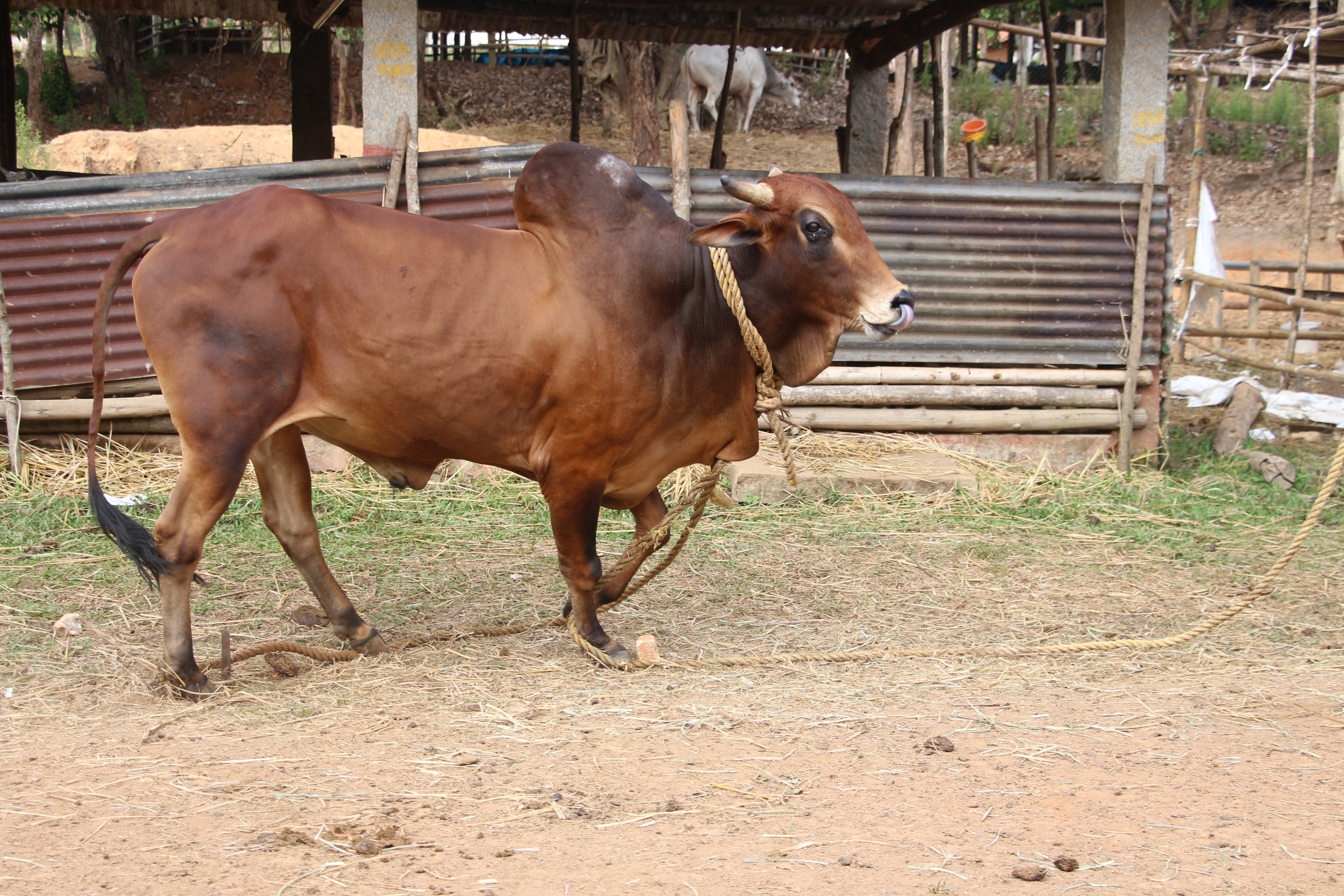
Red Kandhari Bull

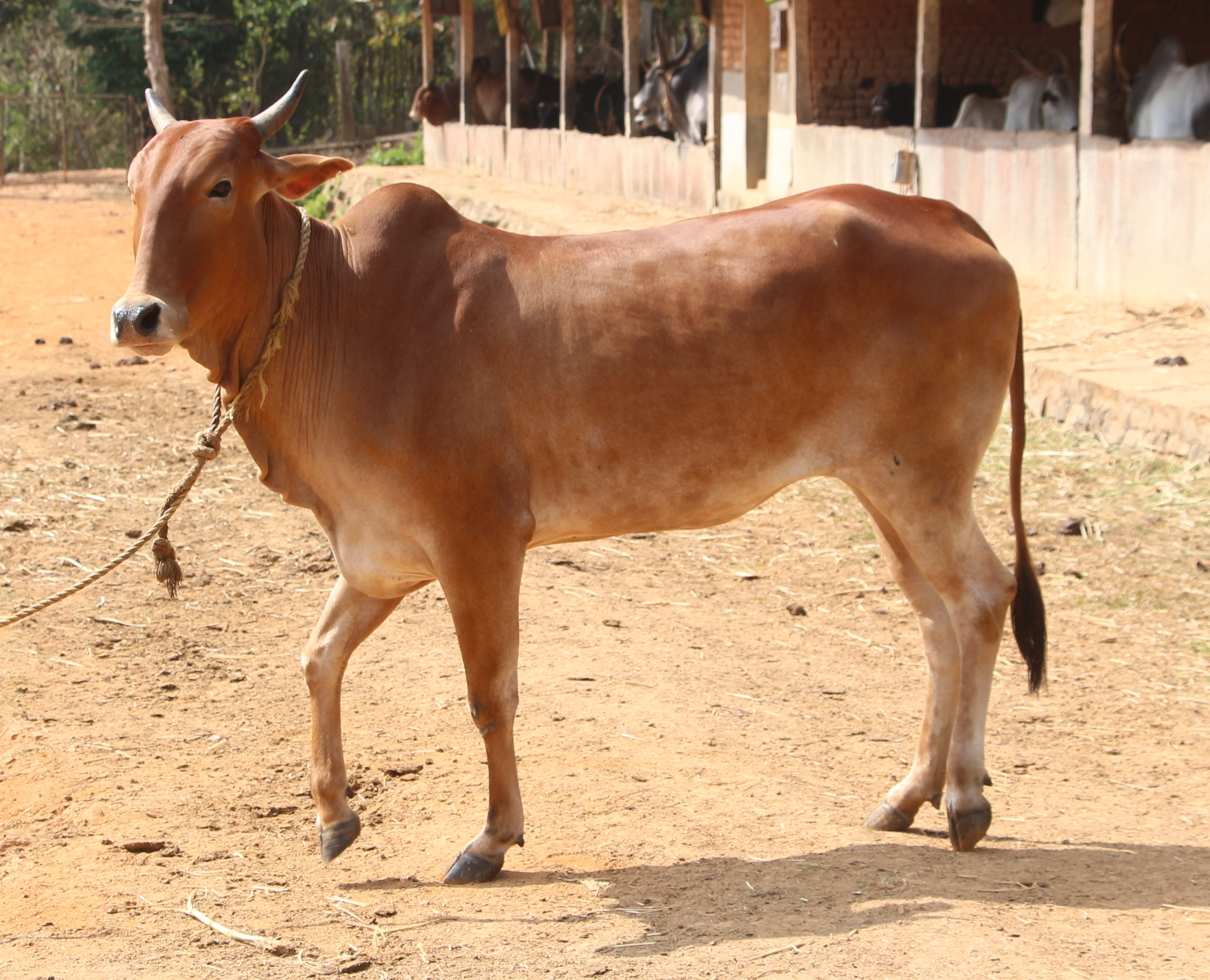
Red Kandhari Cow

Red Kandhari, locally known as Lal Kandhari, is a breed of cattle native to India. They are named so because of their almost universal deep red coloured skin. They are known to have originated in Latur, Kandhar taluk in Nanded district and Parbhani district in Marathawada region in Maharashtra. They are also commonly found in adjoining North Karnataka region. The breed is known to have got royal patronage from King Somadevaraya who ruled over Kandhar in 4 A.D. The cattle are medium-sized and robust in appearance. Kandhari cattle is widely used for draft purposes, mainly for heavy works.

== See also ==
- List of breeds of cattle
