= Kherigarh =

Breed of cattle

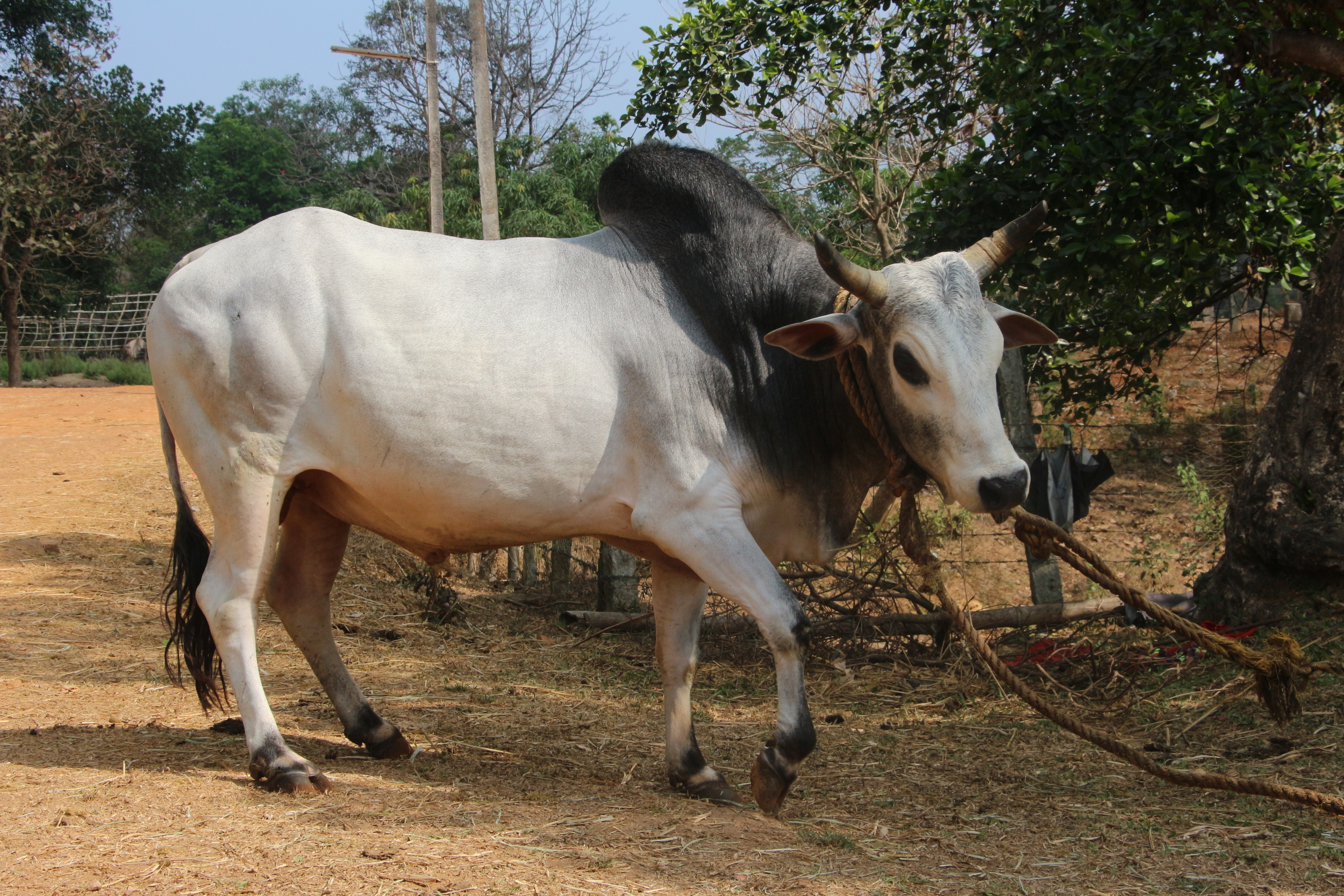
Kherigarh bull

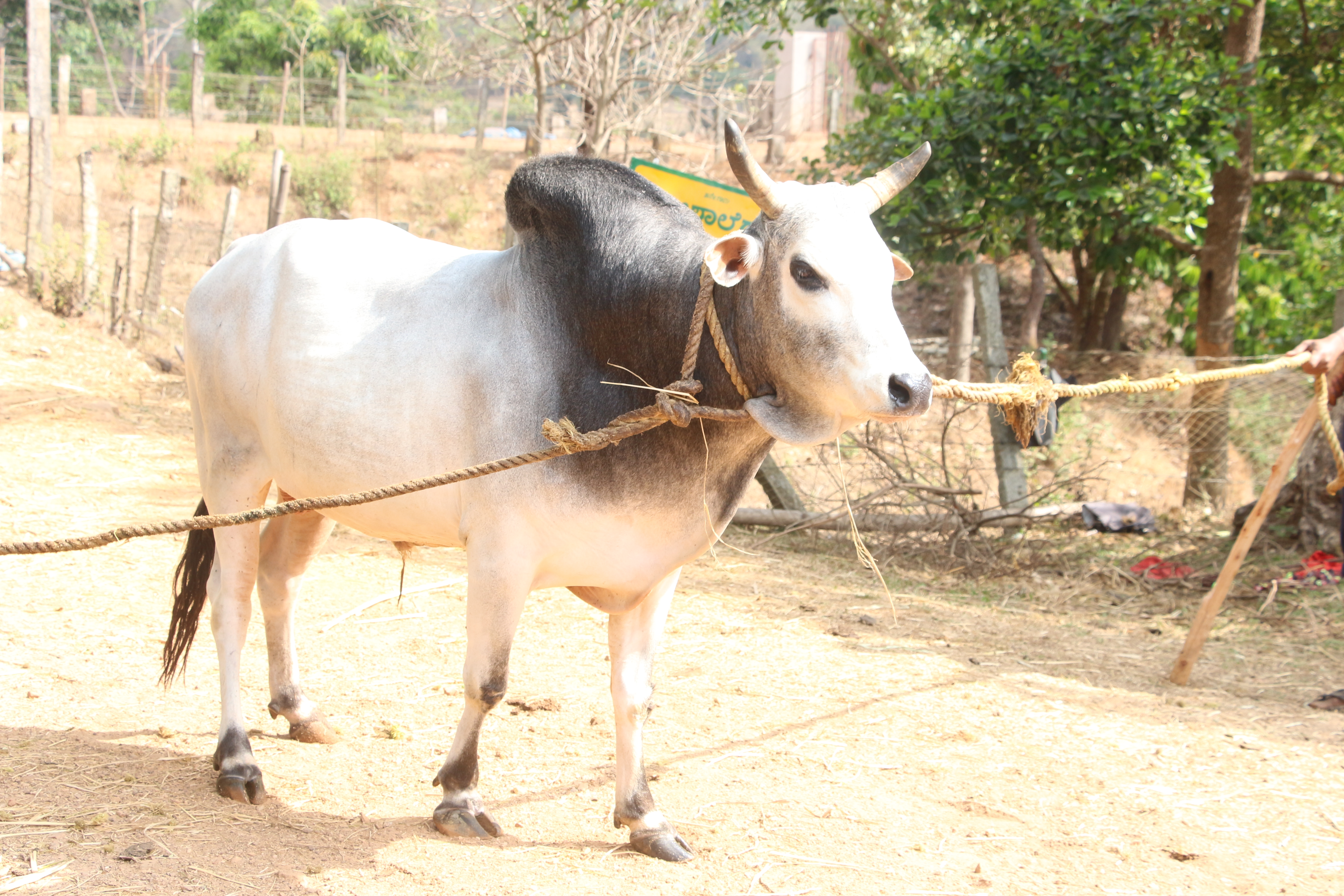
Kherigarh bull

Kherigarh is an indigenous breed of cattle in India. It originated in the Lakhimpur Kheri district of the state of Uttar Pradesh. They are closely related to the Malwa breed. It is a draught breed; the bulls are used for light draft works.

== See also ==
- List of cattle breeds
