= Tharparkar cattle =

Breed of cattle

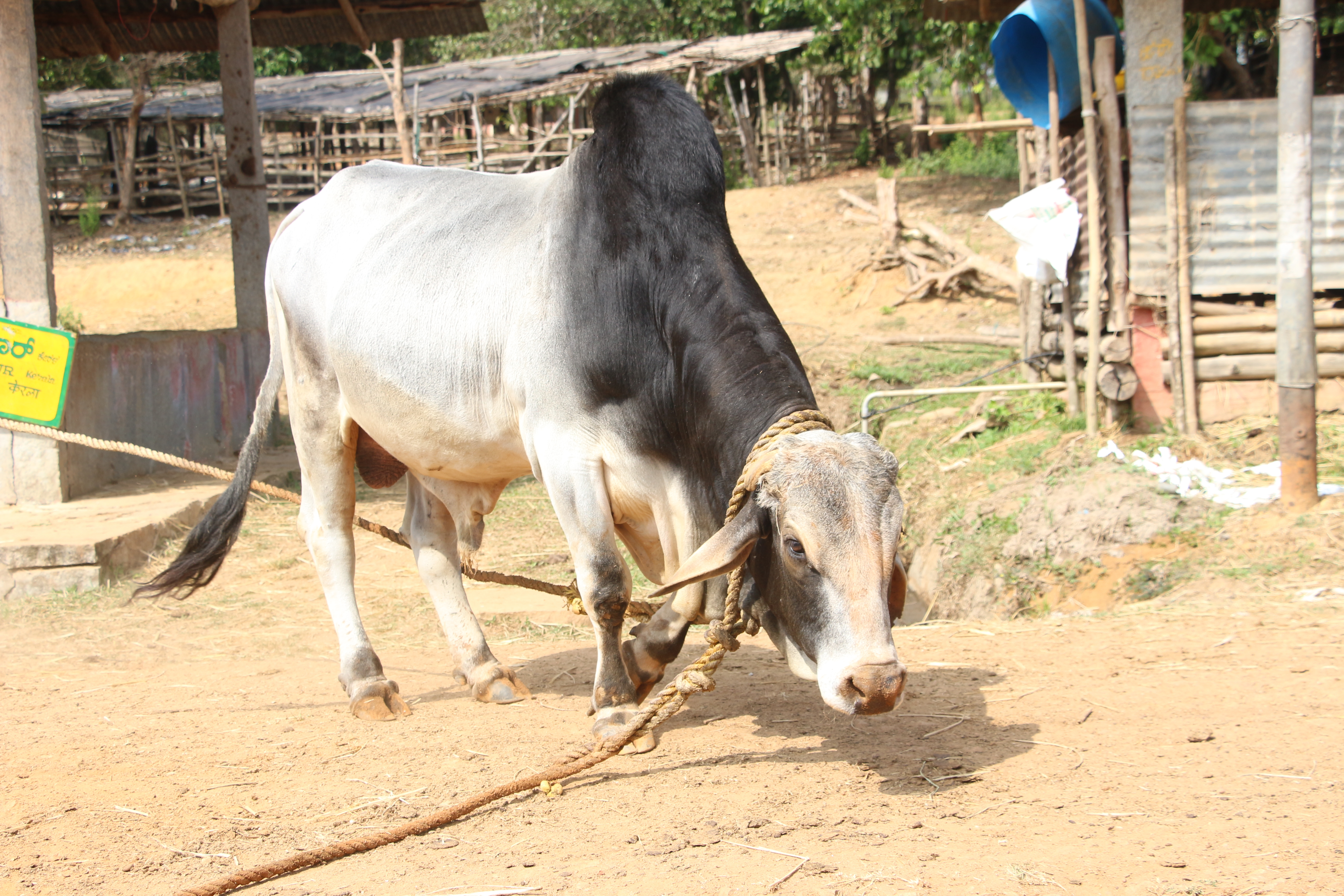
Tharparkar bull

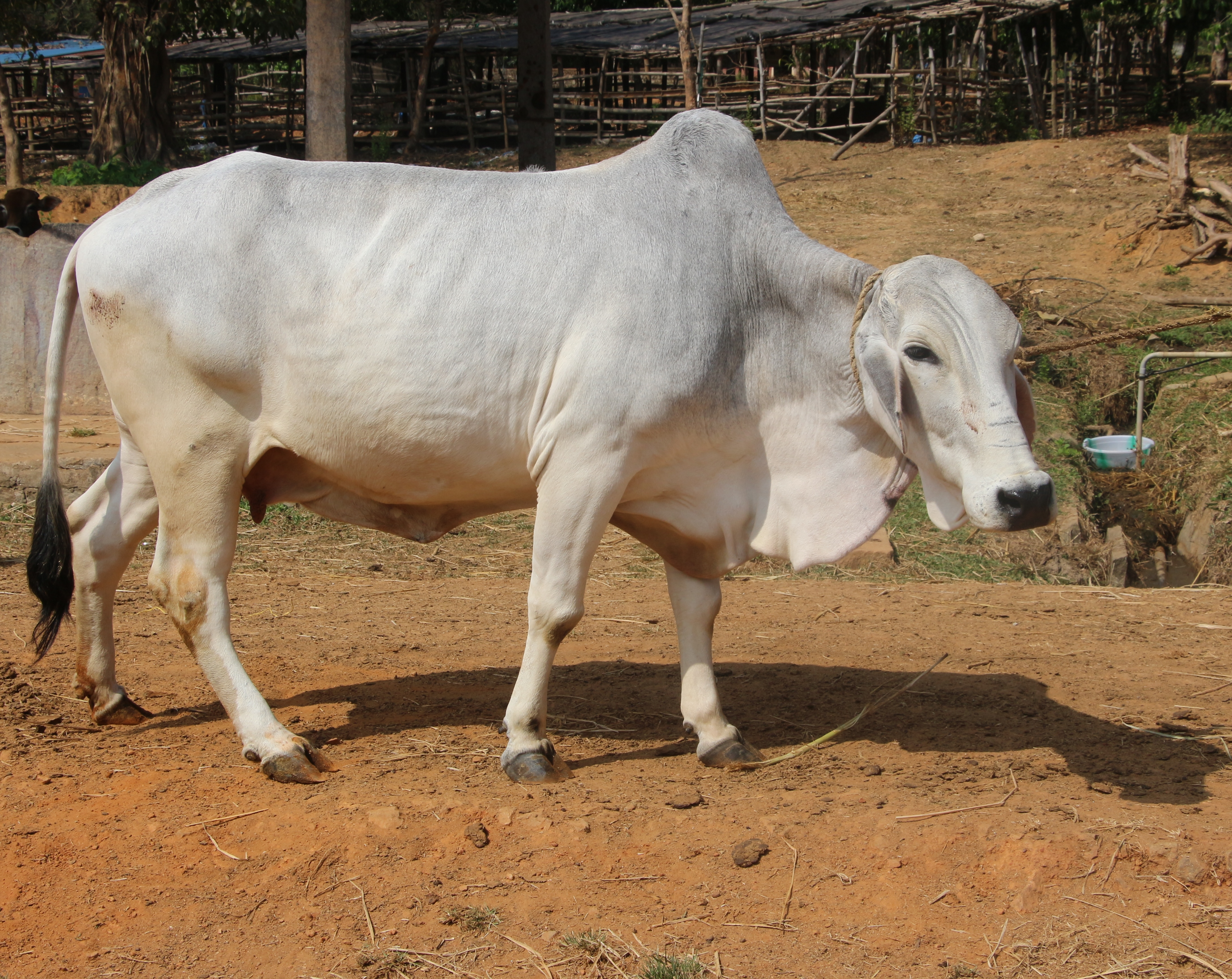
Tharparkar cow

The Tharparkar (Sindhi: ٿرپارڪر) (also known as White Sindhi, Cutchi and Thari) is an indigenous breed of zebuine cattle from the Indian subcontinent, originating in Tharparkar District in Sindh province, now in Pakistan, and is also found in India. It is a dual-purpose breed known for both its milking and draught potential. The cattle is of medium to large build with white to gray skin. The "Tharparkar" is named after the Thar Desert in Pakistan and India.

== Habitat ==
The Tharparkar breed has been named after the district in Sindh and Gujarat from which it originates. This district has large stretches of sand dunes, and adequate grazing is only available a few months after the monsoon rains (July to September). They are very well adapted to the extreme climatic conditions and feed scarcity of their home tract.

== Physical Characteristics ==
Thari are medium-sized animals with a long tapering face, slightly convex forehead, medium-sized horns that curve upward and outward, and large, semi-pendulous ears. They are generally light grey, with the colour deepening on the fore and hindquarters in males. A white stripe runs along the backbone. The tail twitch is black. They have a well-developed, firm hump, medium dewlap, deep barrel, and strong legs. The udder is medium-sized and strong. Cows are fairly good milk producers. Adult males and females weigh 400-500 and 300-380 kg, respectively.

== See also ==
- List of breeds of cattle
- Red Sindhi cattle
- Sahiwal cattle
