= Kenkatha =

Breed of cattle

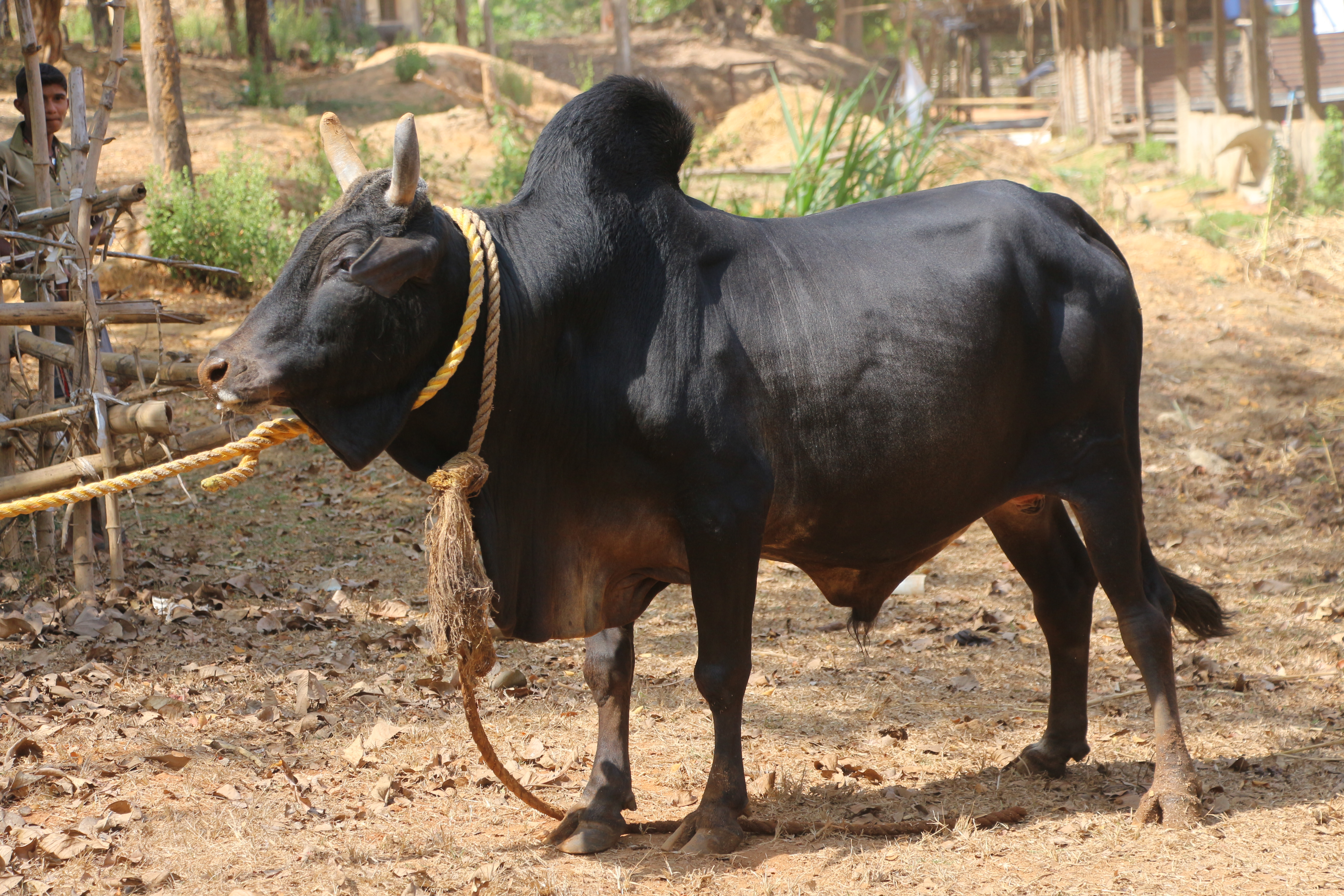
Kenkatha Bull

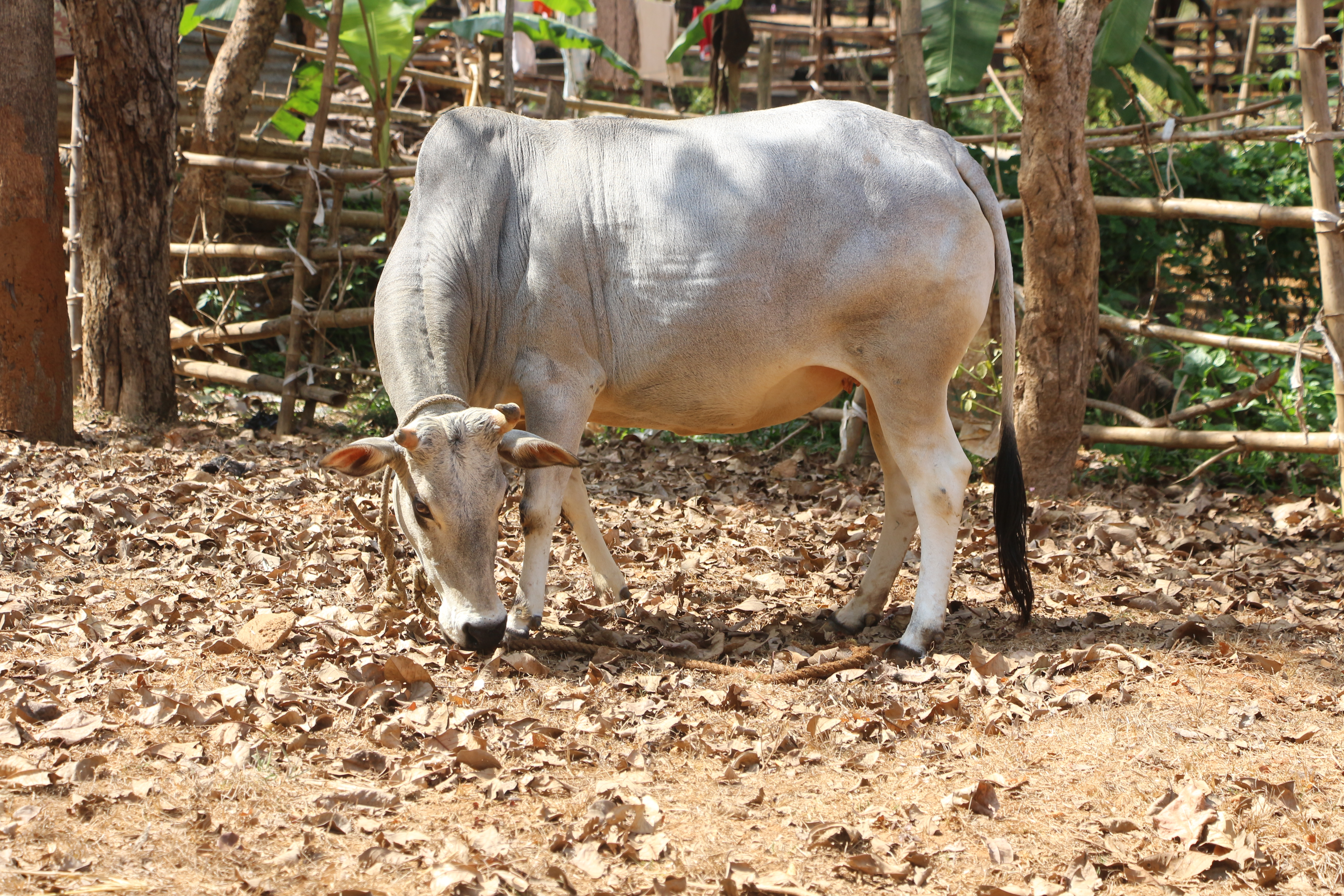
Kenkatha Cow

Kenkatha (Hindi:केन्काथा), also known as Kenwariya, is a breed of cattle native to India. They originated in the provinces of Bundelkhand in the state of Uttar Pradesh along the banks of river Ken and Vindhyas hilly range in Madhya Pradesh. They are of small and compact build and exhibit different shades of gray and black, rarely white complexions. The cattle is used for draft purposes and is known to have the ability to survive harsh environments and on poor quality forage.

== See also ==
- List of breeds of cattle
