= Pulikulam =

Breed of cattle

Pulikulam is a breed of zebu (Bos indicus) cattle. Its name derives from Pulikulam village located in Sivagangai, Tamil Nadu. Also bred in Madurai and Virudhunagar Districts of Tamil Nadu, is also known as “Palingu maadu”, “Mani maadu”, “Jallikattu maadu”, “Mattu maadu” and “Kilakattu maadu”. It is an indigenous breed of India. It is popularly used in Jallikkattu.

It is considered to be one of the drought tolerant breeds in South India.
