= Amrit Mahal =

Breed of cattle

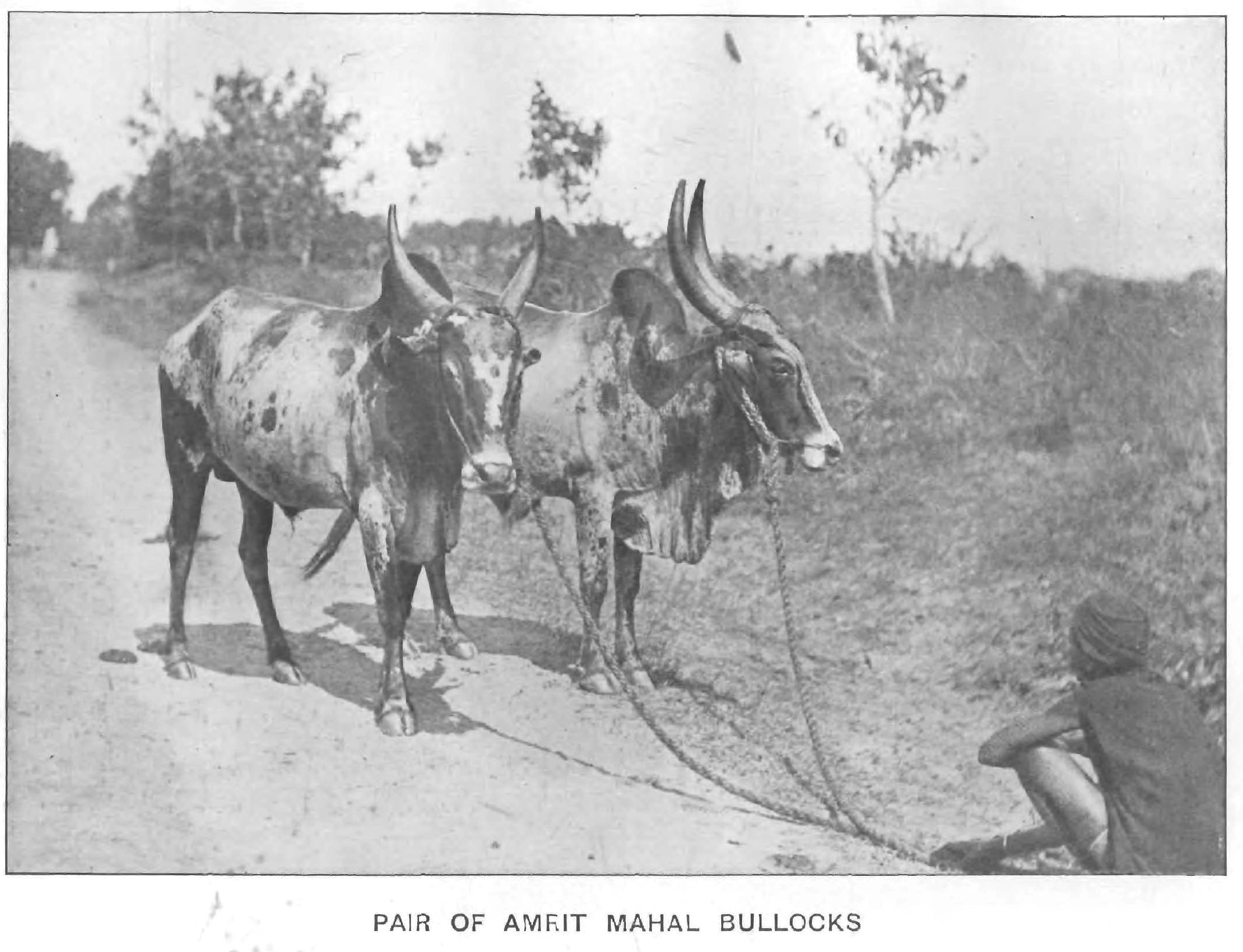
A pair of Amrit Mahal bullocks

The Amrit Mahal (Kannada:ಅಮೃತ ಮಹಲ್) is a breed of cattle that originated from the erstwhile state of Mysore in Karnataka, India. They originated from the Hallikar and closely related breeds, Hagalavadi and Chithradurg. Originally developed for use in war for transporting equipage, the bullocks are notable for their great endurance and speed. Their head is elongated with a ridge in the middle and a bulging forehead. The cows in contrast are poor milk-yielders and hence, are classified to be a draught breed.

The Amrit Mahal is one of the two breeds, along with Hallikar, which have received the royal patronage and care from the erstwhile Vijayanagara Kingdom, sultans and princely state of Mysore through conservation and development.

Amrit Mahal was originally bred by the Hallikar community traditionally known for cattle rearing and animal husbandry. During Chikka Devaraja Wadiyar's reign a department was created within his administration known as "Benne chavadi" literally "butter department" which maintained cows and bulls, branded (with his initial ದೇ /Dē/) and maintained for supplying butter and milk to the royal household. This was taken over by Hyder Ali and he renamed the administrative unit as "Amrit Mahal". The British took an interest in these cattle when Hyder Ali used them to move guns 100 miles in two days to Chelambram during the Battle of Porto Novo and when Tipu Sultan used them to march across south India in a month. They were then adopted for use in the army by the Duke of Wellington. After the defeat of Tipu Sultan, the British allowed them to be maintained by the Maharaja of Mysore but in thirteen years they were found to have regressed. In 1813, the pasture lands known as kaval or Kaaval (Kannada:ಕಾವಲ್) and the cattle were placed under a Captain Harvey of the Madras Commissariat for management of the breed. In 1842, a report stated that the English Army was served efficiently by 230 Mysore bullocks in Afghanistan. In 1860, Charles Trevelyan closed down this unit as being uneconomical but it was re-established in 1867 with the assistance of the Mysore Maharaja and by 1870 about 4000 cows and 100 bulls were under government care. The charge moved back to the Maharaja of Mysore in 1883.

The kavals were classified for use in wet, dry and cold weather. The cows would not come into season in the wet malnad regions but had to be taken into the dry plains where they bred. Beginning in the 20th century, the kavals were increasingly diverted for other uses.

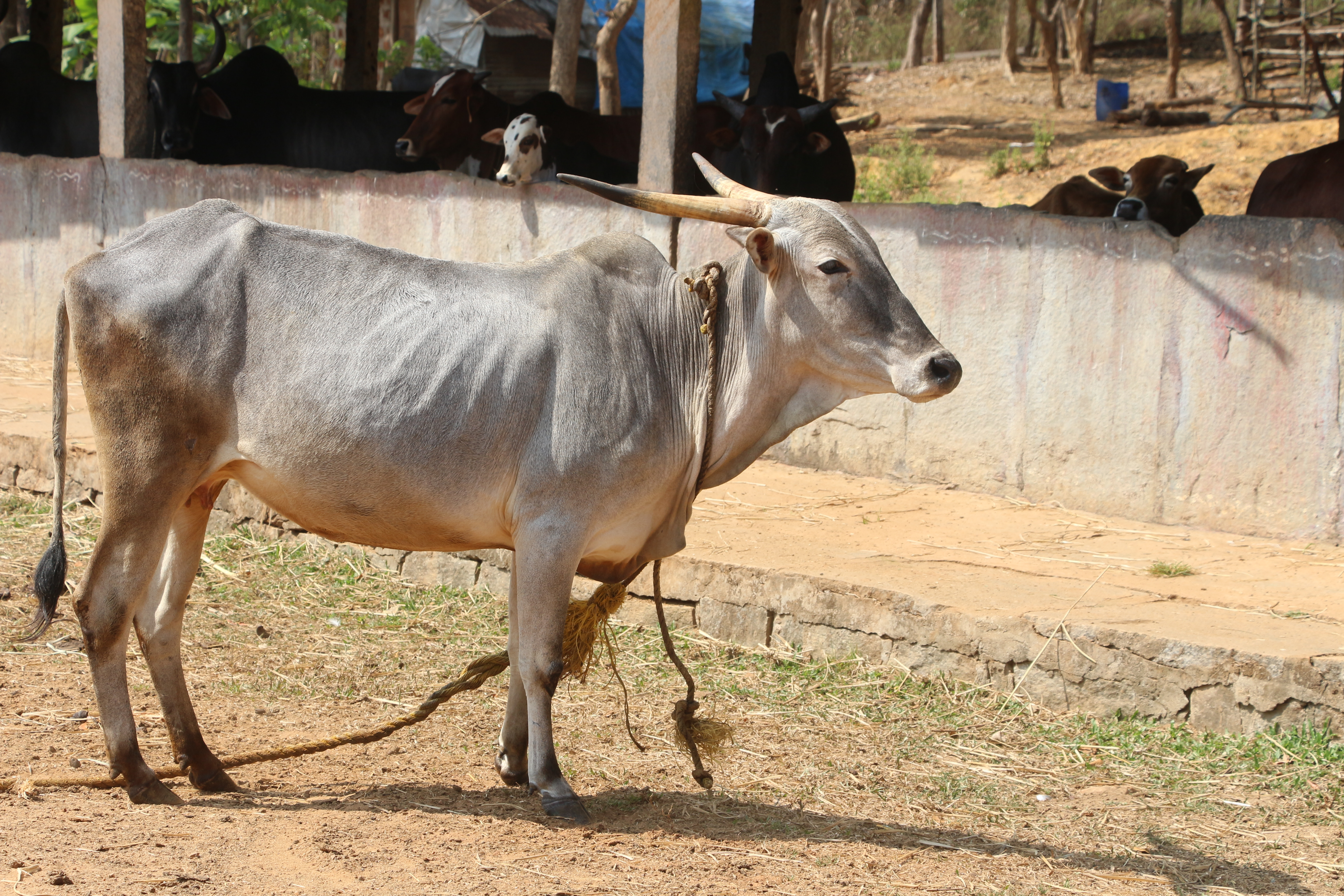
Amrit Mahal cow

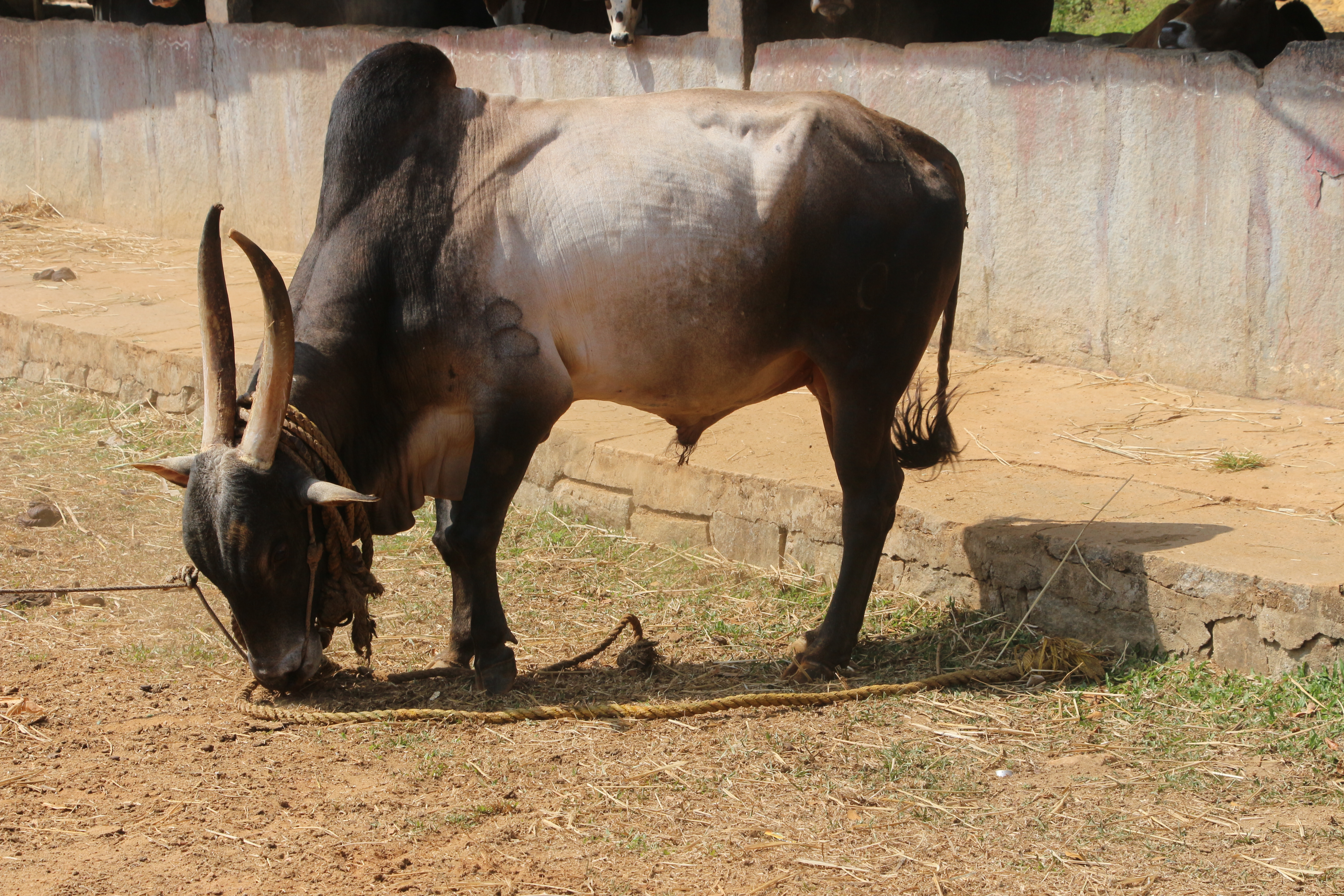
Amrit Mahal Bull

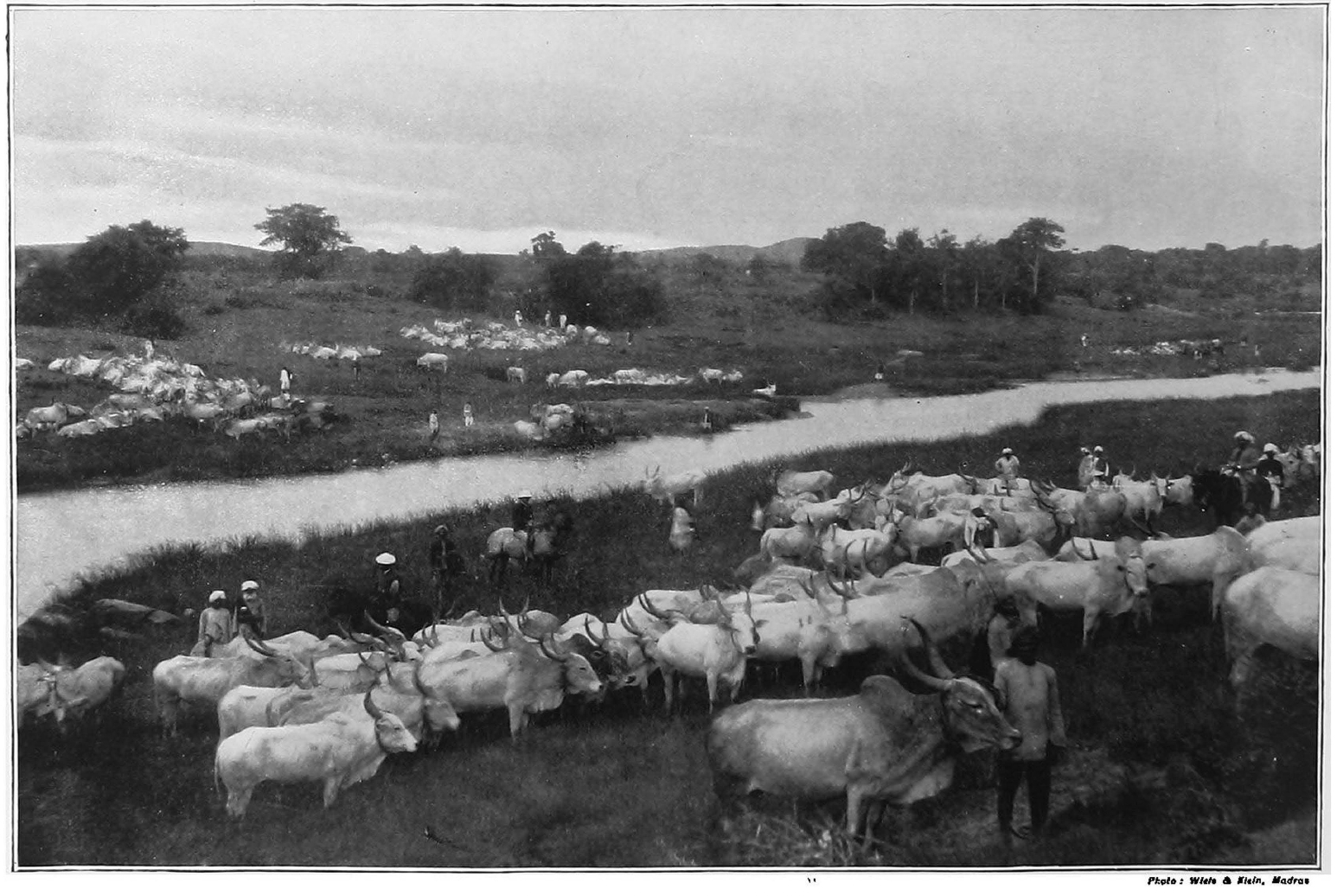
The Amrit Mahal farm in Hunsur c. 1889

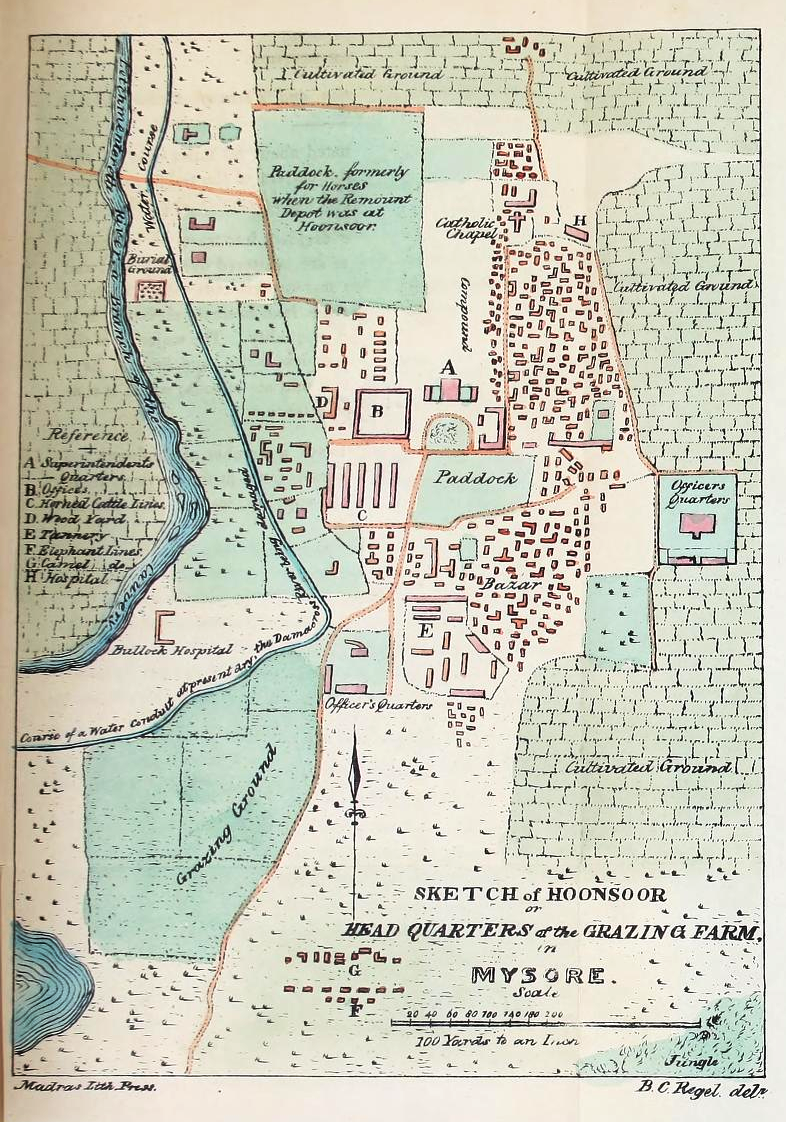
Map of the Hunsur commissariat farm

== See also ==
- List of breeds of cattle
