= Malnad Gidda =

Breed of cattle

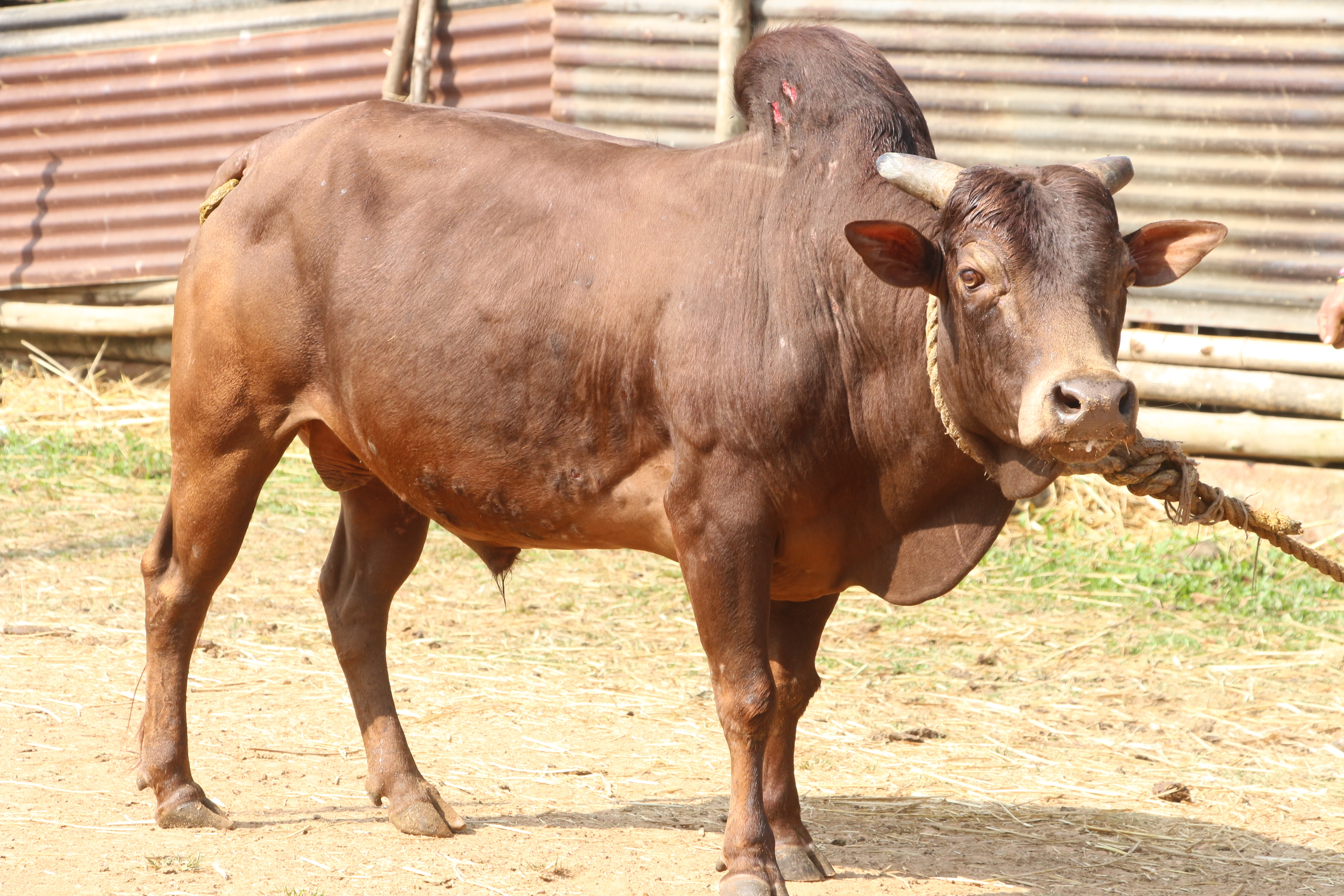
Malnad Gidda Bull

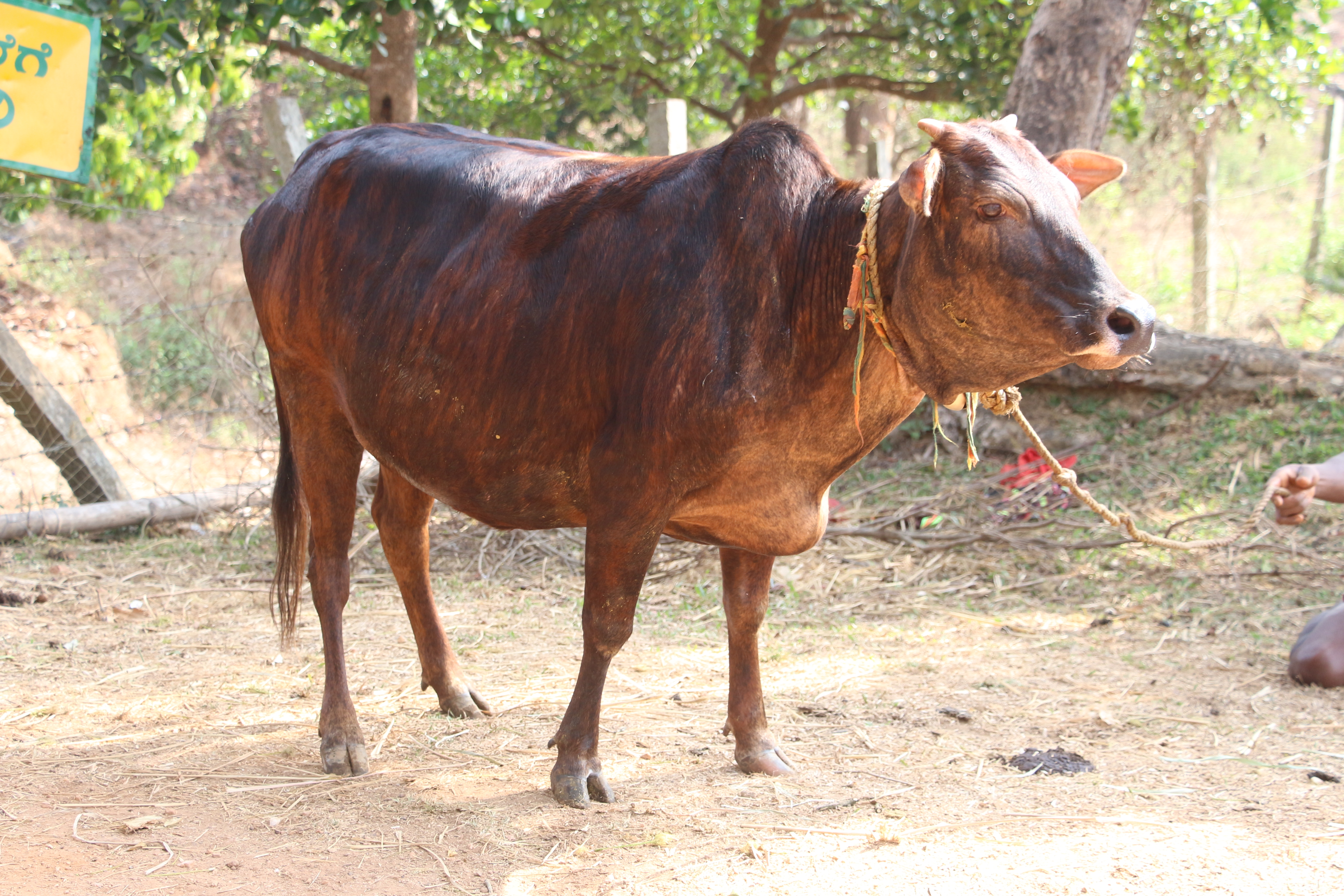
Malnad Gidda Cow

Malnad Gidda or Malenadu Gidda (Kannada:ಮಲೆನಾಡು ಗಿಡ್ಡ) is a dwarf breed of cattle native to the hilly, rainy and densely forested Malenadu region of the Western Ghats in the state of Karnataka in India. It is also known as Uradana (Kannada:ಊರದನ) and Varshagandhi (Kannada:ವರ್ಷಗಂಧಿ). They are of short stature and known for their adaptability and disease resistance. The milk and urine is of medicinal value. The cattle can also be sustained solely on grazing the forests and rural terrains. They are found to be of black to brown complexions and are very active in temperament and are highly intelligent, also able to jump 5 feet fences. The breed which was once an undistinguished variety has now been declared officially as a distinct breed by the authorities. This cow breed is commonly found in Shimoga, Mangalore, Chikkamangalore, Uttara Kannada and Udupi districts.

Average of 90 cm height at the withers and requires minimum fodder for survival. Milk yield is up to 3-4 ltrs per day. 2 ltrs on average.

== See also ==
- List of breeds of cattle
