= Khillari cattle =

Breed of cattle

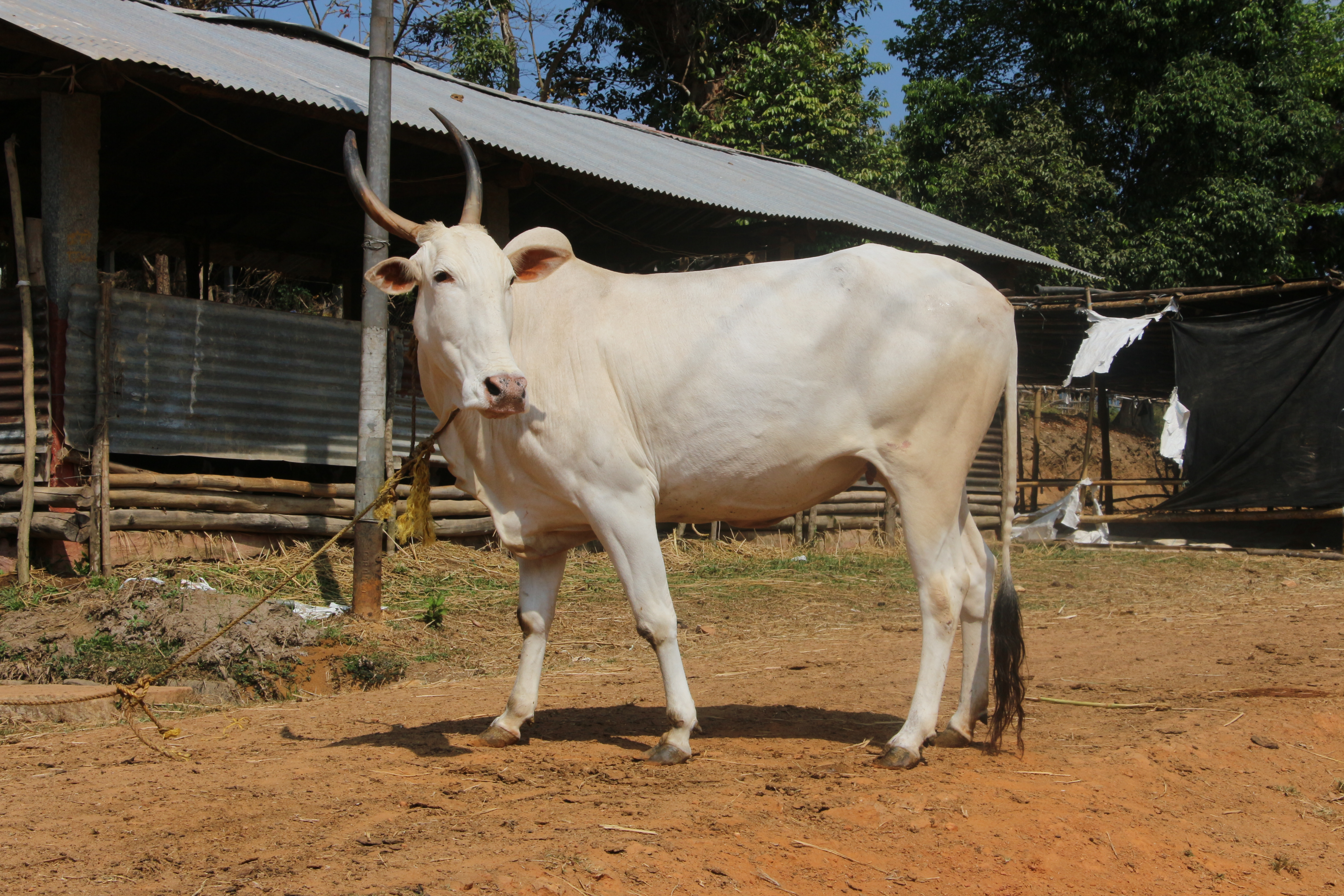
Killari cow

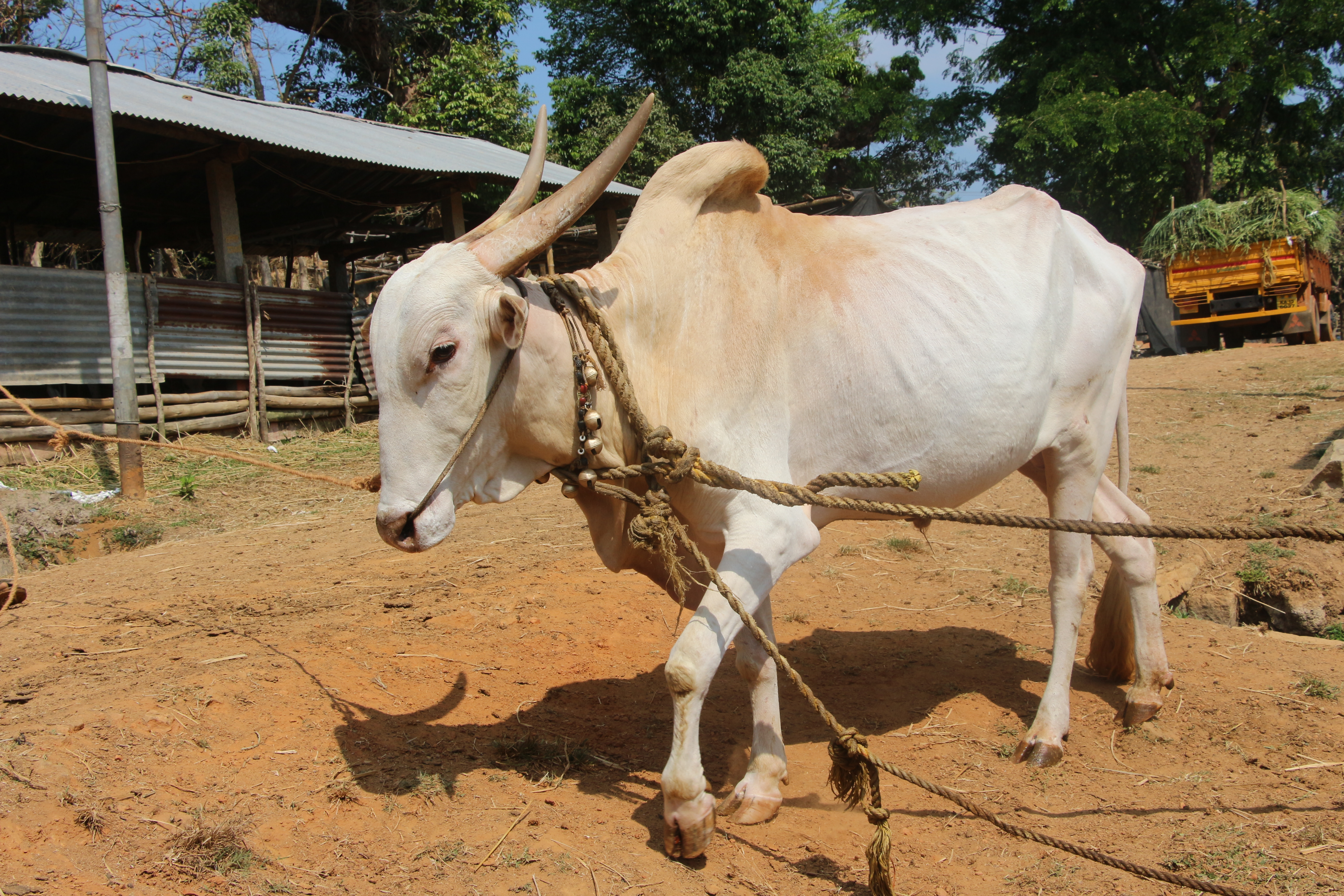
Killari bull

The Khillari is a cattle breed. It is a member of the Bos indicus sub-species, native to Satara, Sangli and Kolhapur regions in Maharashtra and Bijapur, Dharwad and Belagavi districts of Karnataka in India. The breed is well adapted to the area's tropical and drought-prone conditions. They are favoured by the local farming community due to their ability to handle the hardships of farming. The breed is in decline, mostly due low milk yield, which offers an alternate income stream to a farmer.

== History ==
The Khillari breed includes several varieties. It possibly owes its origin to the Hallikar breed of cattle from Mysore State. The name comes from "Khillar" meaning a herd of cattle, and Khillari meaning the herdsman.

== Characteristics ==
The Khillari is between 4½ and 5½ feet tall and weighs between 350 and 450 kg. The typical specimen is compact and tight skinned, with clean cut features and squarely developed hindquarters. The appearance is compact with stout strong limbs. The pelvis is slightly higher than the shoulders. The Khillaris of the Deccan plateau, the Mhaswad and the Atpadi Mahal types are greyish white in colour. The males have deeper colour over the forequarters and hindquarters, with peculiar grey and white mottling on the face. The Tapti Khillari is white with reddish nose and hooves. The Nakali Khillari is grey with tawny or brickdust color over the forequarters. Newly born calves have rust red coloured polls, but this disappears within months. Khillaris have a long narrow head with long horns sweeping back and then upward in a distinctive bow, and tapering to a fine point. The ears, coloured yellow inside are small, pointed and held sideways. The legs are round and straight with black hooves. The coat is fine, short and glossy.

== Varieties ==
Four principal types of Khillaris are prevalent in Maharashtra State. Hanam Khillar (sometimes Atpadi Mahal, Sangli), is prevalent in southern Maharashtra .In Kolhapur and Satara and adjoining areas. Mhaswad Khillari live mostly in Man & Khatav talukas of Satara District. In the area of the Satpura range of hills comprising the West Khandesh district Tapi Khillari or Thillari predominate. Nakali Khillari is of more recent origin. Nakali means "imitation". It is found in adjacent areas of these regions.

== Breeding ==
In southern Maharashtra and Solapur, Sangli and Satara districts, Khillaris are bred by cultivators. In these regions the size of the herd is small, usually one or two cows. In the Satpura ranges the Khillaris are bred by professional breeders known as Thillaris. These breeders produce bulls and bullocks. Khillaris are classified as "medium fast draft". Breeding is carried out by the Government of Mahararashtra at Hingoli, Jath and Junoni and by the Government of Karnataka at Bankapur.
