= Hariana cattle =

Breed of cattle

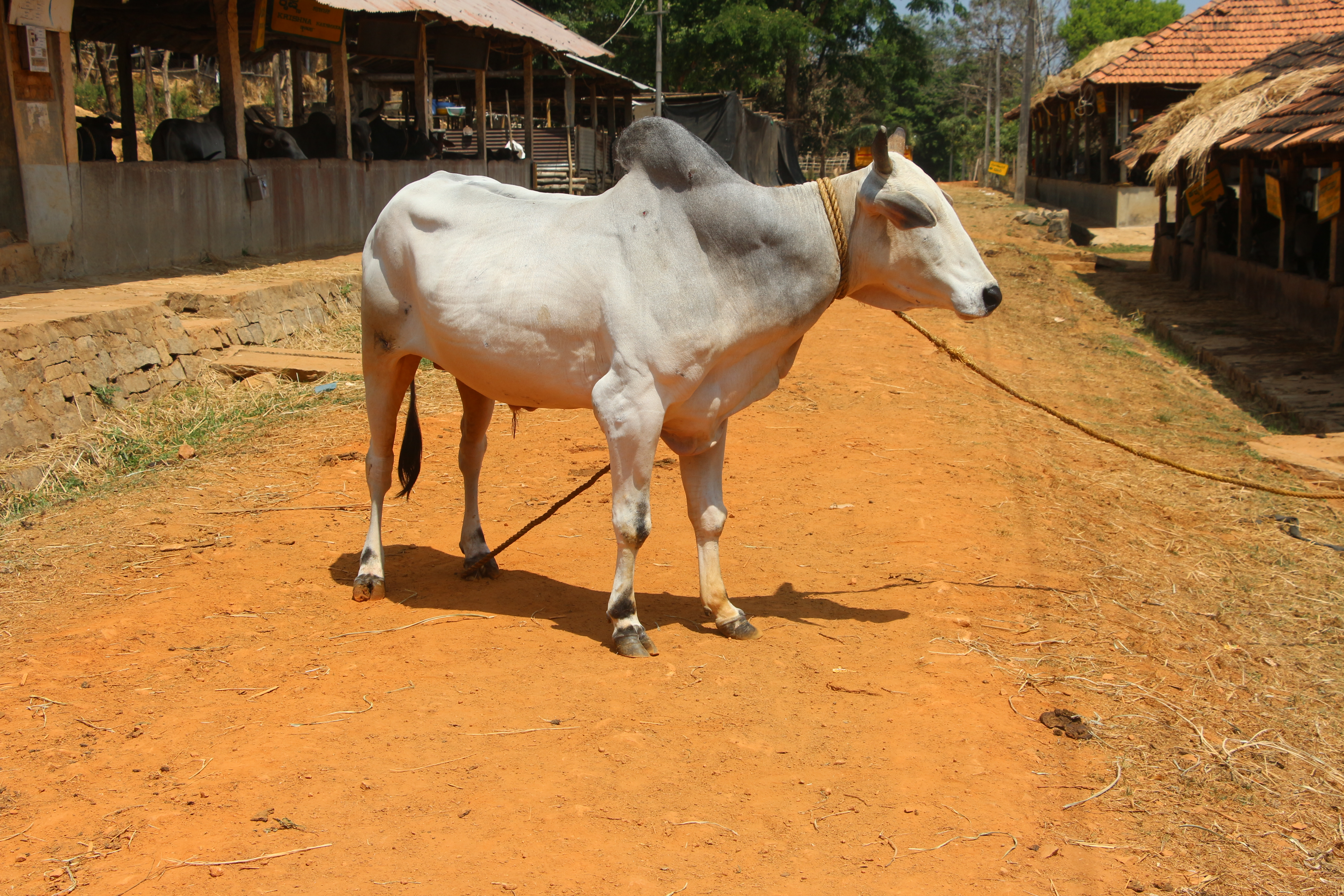
Haryanvi bull

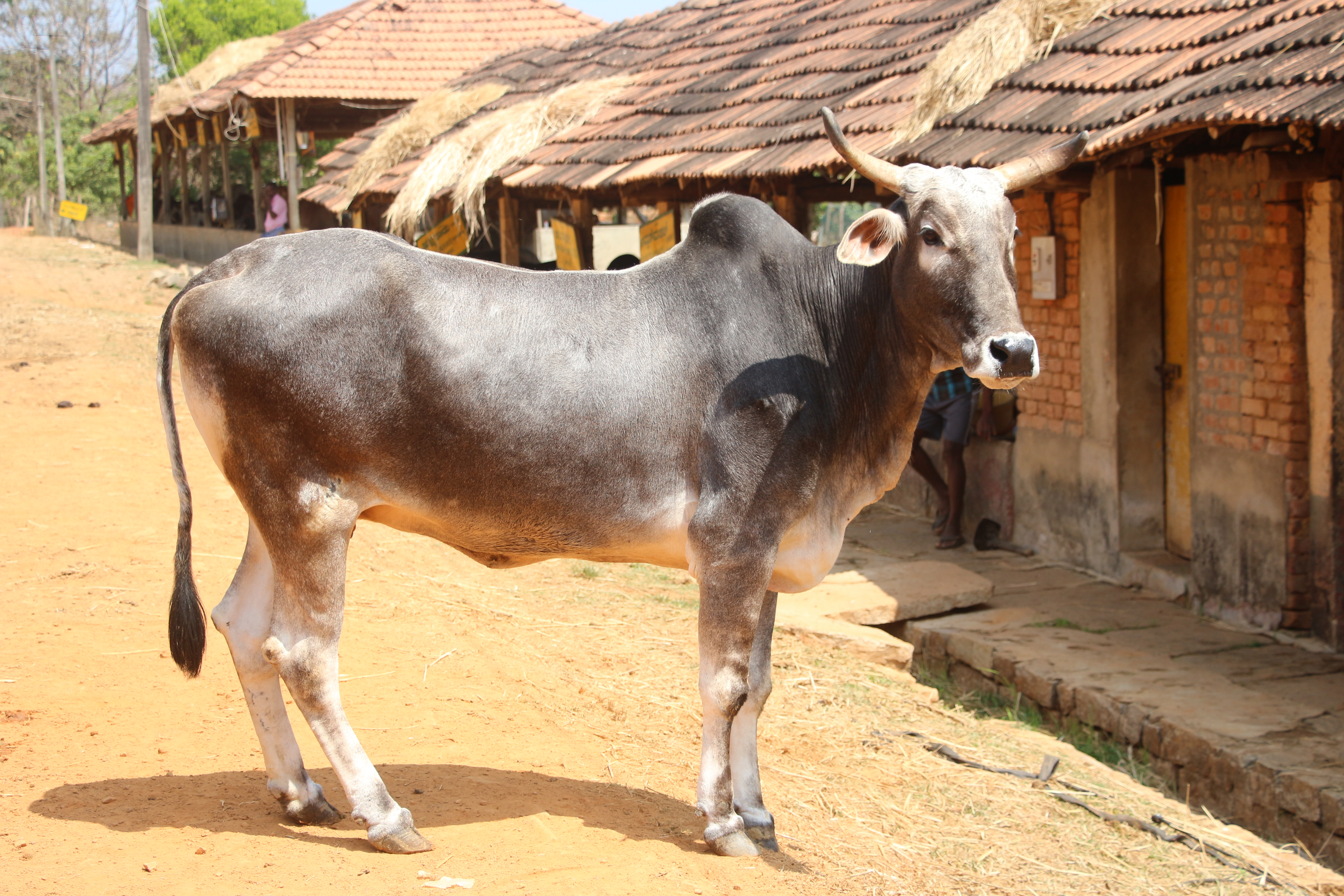
Haryanvi cow

Hariana (Hindi: हरियाना) or haryanvi is an Indian breed of cattle native to North India, specially the state of Haryana. They produce about 10 to 15 litres of milk a day, compared to 8.9 litres when cross-bred with Holstein Friesian cattle (HS), whereas pure HS can produce 50 litres a day, but it is not as disease-resistant in the conditions of North India.

== Range ==
The breed is native to Rohtak, Jhajjar, Karnal, Kurukshetra, Jind, Hissar, Nuh and Gurugram districts in the state of Haryana. The cattle are of medium to large size, and are generally of white to gray shades in color.

== Features ==
Horns are short and the face is narrow and long. The cows are fairly good milk yielders, and bulls are good at work. It is an important dual-purpose, milk and draught, cattle breed of India.

== Origin ==
The Hariana breed, found in Haryana and eastern Punjab, is one of the 75 known breeds of zebu (Bos indicus).

== See also ==
- Gir cattle
- Jersey cattle
- Government Livestock Farm, Hisar
- List of breeds of cattle
- National Dairy Research Institute, Karnal,
