= Krishna Valley =

Indian breed of draught cattle

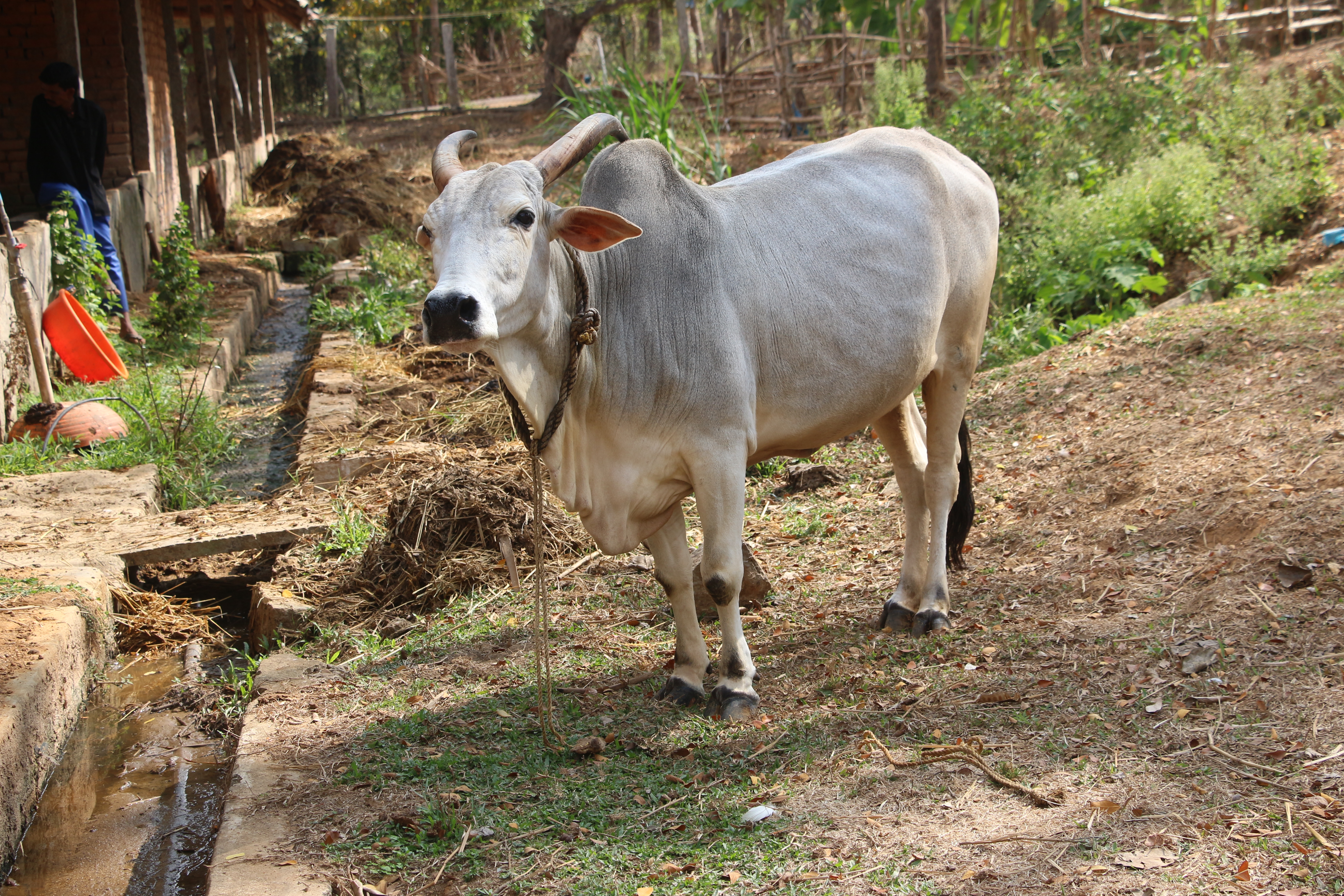
- A cow

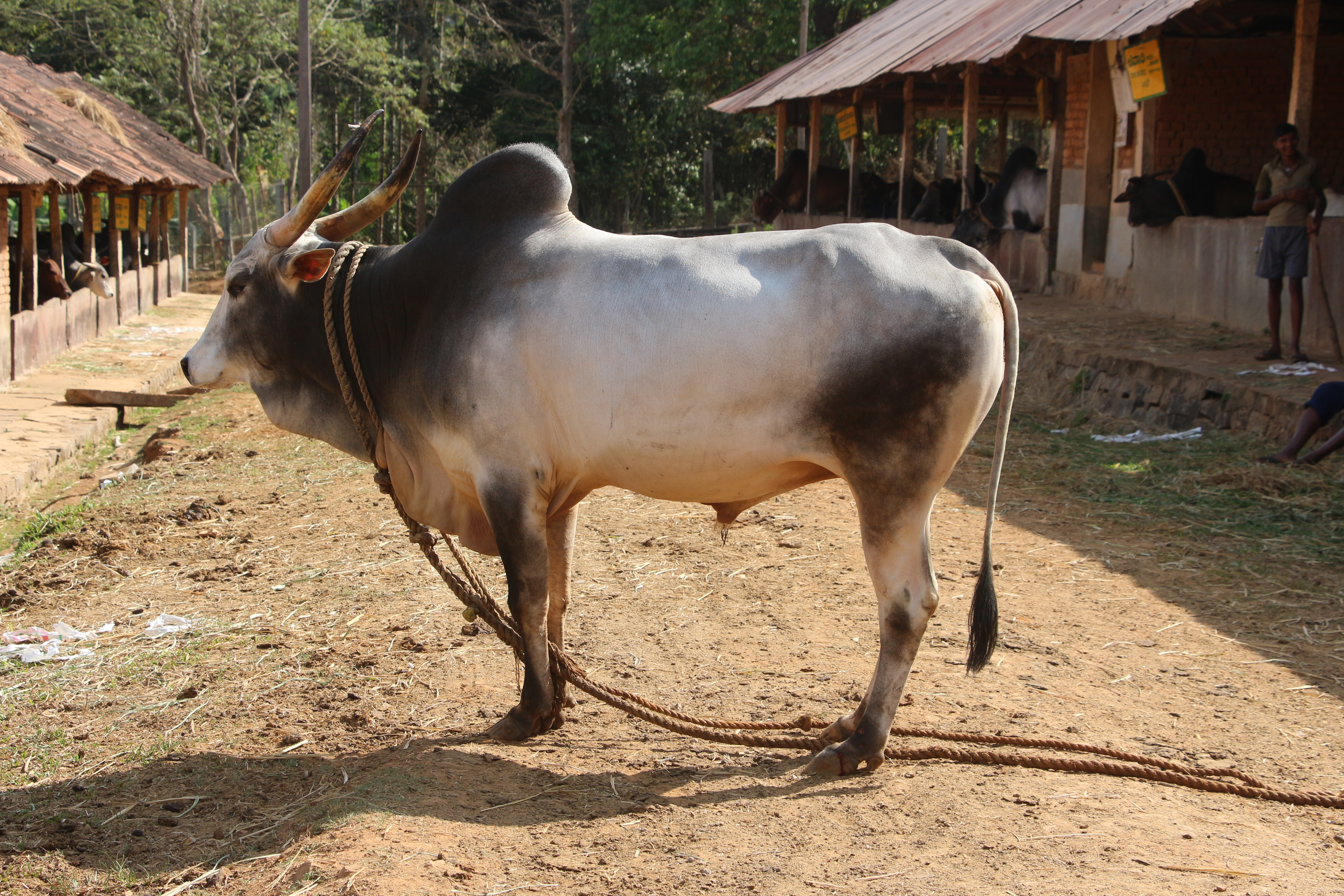
- A bull
- Conservation status: FAO (2007): not at risk
- Country of origin: India
- Distribution: northern Karnataka
- Use: draught

Traits
- Weight: Male: 550 kg; Female: 325 kg
- Height: Male: 150 cm; Female: 116 cm
- Coat: greyish white
- Horn status: horned
- Cattle; Bos (primigenius) indicus

The Krishna Valley is an Indian breed of draught cattle. It originated in the areas drained by the Krishna, Ghataprabha and Malaprabha rivers. It is a recent breed, bred in the late nineteenth century as a draught animal for agricultural purposes.

== History ==
The Krishna Valley is a relatively modern breed. It was bred from about 1880 by the Mahratta Rajas of the southern part of Hyderabad State (now Maharashtra). A local breed known as Gaonti was cross-bred with Gir, Kankrej and Ongole, with selection for the power and size needed to plough the sticky soil of the valleys of the Krishna River and its tributaries such as the Ghatprabha and the Malaprabha. Its range included the districts of Sangli, Satara and Solapur in Maharashtra, and of Belgaum, Bijapur and Raichur in Karnataka. The Rao of Sangli was a noted breeder of these cattle.

In 1946 the total breed population was estimated to be approximately 650000; by 2012 it was believed that the number had fallen below 1000 head. The range of the breed has contracted, and it is now found only in northern Karnataka, in the districts of Bagalkot, Belgaum and Bijapur. A breed conservation programme was started in the early twenty-first century. Semen was collected from eight selected bulls; more than 4000 doses were used for artificial insemination, and another 8000 doses were frozen for conservation in the gene bank of the National Bureau of Animal Genetic Resources. A small conservation herd is kept at Bangalore.

== Use ==
The Krishna Valley was bred for heavy draught work, both for ploughing agricultural land and for the transport of crops such as cotton and sugar cane. It was among the zebuine breeds used in the creation of the American Brahman composite breed.
