= Canchim =

Brazilian breed of cattle

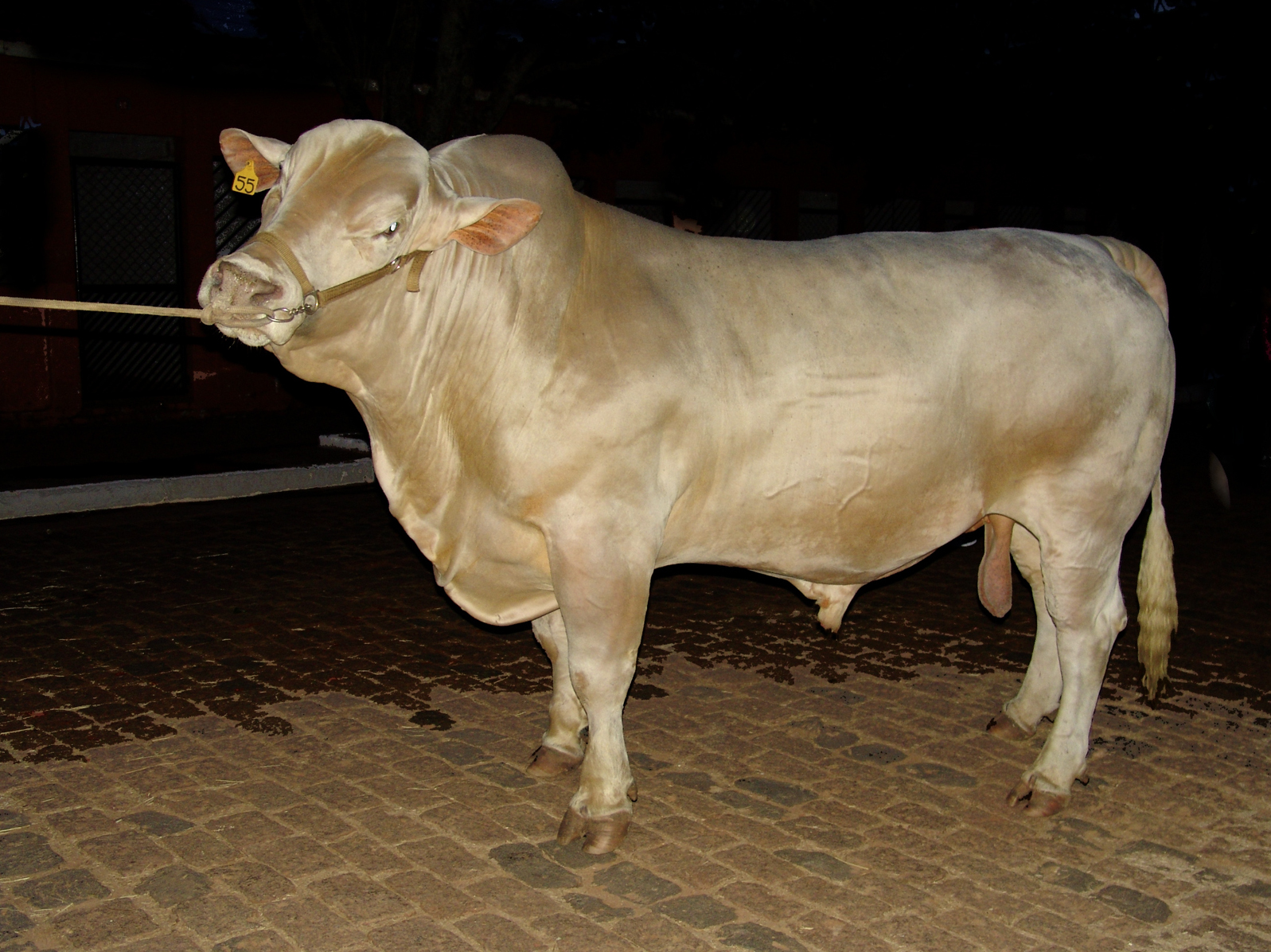
- A bull

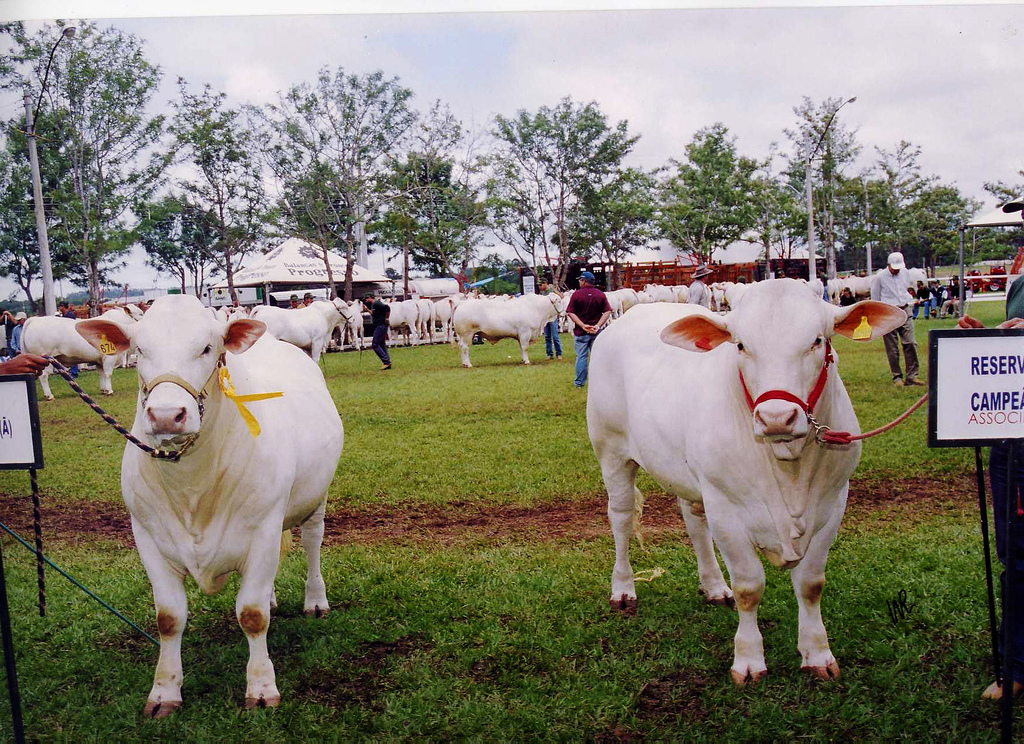
- Conservation status: FAO (2007): not at risk; DAD-IS (2025): not at risk
- Country of origin: Brazil
- Use: beef

Traits
- Weight: Male: 800–1000 kg; Female: 500–650 kg
- Coat: white or cream-coloured
- Cattle; Hybrid Bos (primigenius) taurus/indicus

The Canchim is a modern Brazilian breed of beef cattle. It was developed from about 1940 in São Paulo State by cross-breeding Brazilian zebuine cattle – Indubrasil, Guzerá and Nelore – with bulls of the French Charolais breed.

== History ==
Cattle of the French Charolais breed of beef cattle were imported to Brazil in 1922 by the national ministry of agriculture and taken to the government breeding farm of Urutaí, in the state of Goiás. In 1936 they were moved to another government breeding farm, the Fazenda de Criação at São Carlos in the state of São Paulo; this farm had earlier been known as the Fazenda Canchim, (Note: The estate was named for a tree that was common there, the canchim or canxim, Ophthalmoblapton crassipes; the cattle breed took the former name of the estate.) and later became the Centro Nacional de Pesquisa do Sudeste of the Empresa Brasileira de Pesquisa Agropecuária. There, under the direction of Antônio Teixeira Viana, Charolais bulls from the herd were used from about 1940 in an experimental programme of cross-breeding with Brazilian zebuine cattle of various breeds, with the aim of developing a taurindicine hybrid which would combine the environmental adaptation of the zebu with the productive qualities – including growth rate and meat yield – of the European breed.

Two possible lines of development were explored, both starting from the mating of a zebu cow to a Charolais bull; the first-generation (F1) crosses were thus 50% zebu and 50% European. Mating F1 cows to a Charolais bull gave rise to a second-generation (F2) hybrid with 25% zebu genes, and mating these F2 cows to a zebu bull resulted in stock with 62.5% zebuine and 37.5% European inheritance; reversing the order of the bulls used to sire the second and third generations resulted in the reverse F3 mix, with 37.5% zebuine and 62.5% European genes. In both schemes, the F3 hybrids were then bred together. The stock with 5/8 zebu blood was found to be rustic but highly variable, and to show little productive improvement over the original zebu stock, while those with 5/8 Charolais blood were found to be well-conformed, fast-growing and consistent, with good tolerance of insects and heat; these were the foundation of the Canchim.

A total of 368 zebu cows were used to produce the F1 generation, of which almost 80% were Indubrasil, and the remainder Guzerá and Nelore; fewer than half of these are in the ancestry of the Canchim, which also includes 53 Charolais bulls, 4 Guzerá and 8 Indubrasil.

The first Canchim calves were born in 1953, and the herd was then kept closed until a second phase of cross-breeding was begun in either 1986 or 1990.

A breed society, the Associação Brasileira dos Criadores de Canchim, was formed in 1971, and a herd-book was established in the same year. The breed was officially recognised in 1972.

The Canchim constitutes approximately 3% of the national beef herd.

== Characteristics ==
Body weights for bulls are usually in the range 800 to 1000 kg, although there are records of a bull weighing 1360 kg; cows usually weigh some 500 to 650 kg. Bulls have a small hump. The coat is similar to that of the Charolais, varying from white to cream-coloured.
