= Charolais cattle =

French beef cattle breed

Charolais
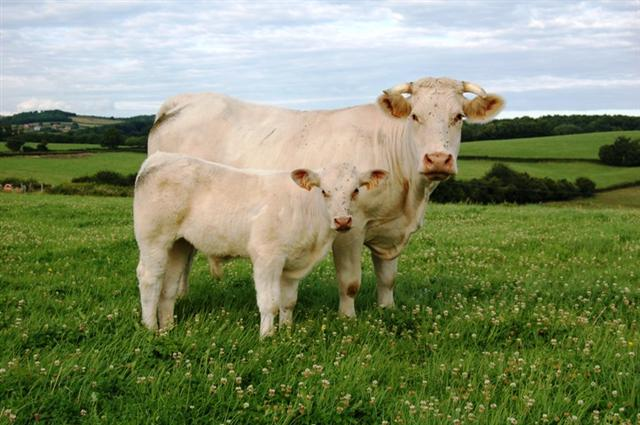
- Cow and calf

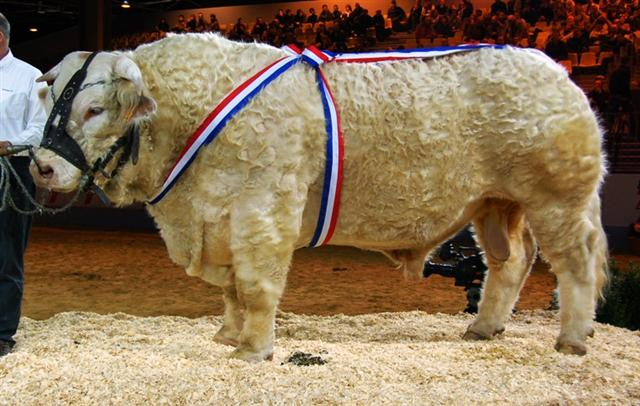
- Bull at the Salon international de l'agriculture in 2011
- Conservation status: FAO (2007): not at risk
- Other names: French: Charolaise
- Country of origin: France
- Distribution: world-wide
- Use: beef

Traits
- Weight: Male: 1000–1650 kg; Female: 700–1200 kg
- Height: 135–150 cm
- Coat: white or cream-coloured
- Horn status: horned in both sexes
- Cattle; Bos (primigenius) taurus

The Charolais (Note: French: [ʃaʁɔlɛ]) or Charolaise (Note: [ʃaʁɔlɛz]) is a French breed of taurine beef cattle. It originates in, and is named for, the Charolais area surrounding Charolles, in the département of Saône-et-Loire in the Bourgogne-Franche-Comté region of eastern France. It is known for its colours, which can vary from white to wheaten.

The Charolais is raised for meat. It has been used in the development of a number of taurindicine breeds such as the Brazilian Canchim, and may be used for cross-breeding with other breeds, among them the Aberdeen Angus and Hereford.

== History ==
The Charolais is a traditional breed of the historic Charolais region, the area round the town of Charolles in the Saône-et-Loire département of the Bourgogne-Franche-Comté region of eastern France – for which it is named. Its range also extended into the Nivernais to the north-west.

The Charolais is the second-most numerous cattle breed in France after the Prim'Holstein, and is the most common beef breed in that country, ahead of the Limousin. At the end of 2014, France had 4.22 million head of Charolais, including 1.56 million cows, down 0.6% from a year earlier.

It is a world breed, reported to DAD-IS by 68 countries, of which 37 report population data. The world population is estimated at 730000. The largest populations are reported from the Czech Republic and Mexico. The breed was introduced to the southern United States from Mexico in 1934.

In 2011, Charolais-Brionnais Country applied to UNESCO to be labelled as a World Heritage Site, citing among other things a "cultural landscape" for raising cattle. The application was not successful.

== Characteristics ==
The Charolais is among the heaviest of cattle breeds: bulls weigh from 1000 to 1650 kg (2200 to 3600 lb), and cows from 700 to 1200 kg (1500 to 2600 lb). The coat ranges from white to cream-coloured; the nose is uniformly pink.

The Charbray, a cross-breed with Brahman cattle, is recognised as a breed in some countries. The Brazilian Canchim is a composite breed with 5/8 Charolais and 3/8 Indu-Brasil. Other derived breeds include Charford and Char-Swiss in the United States.

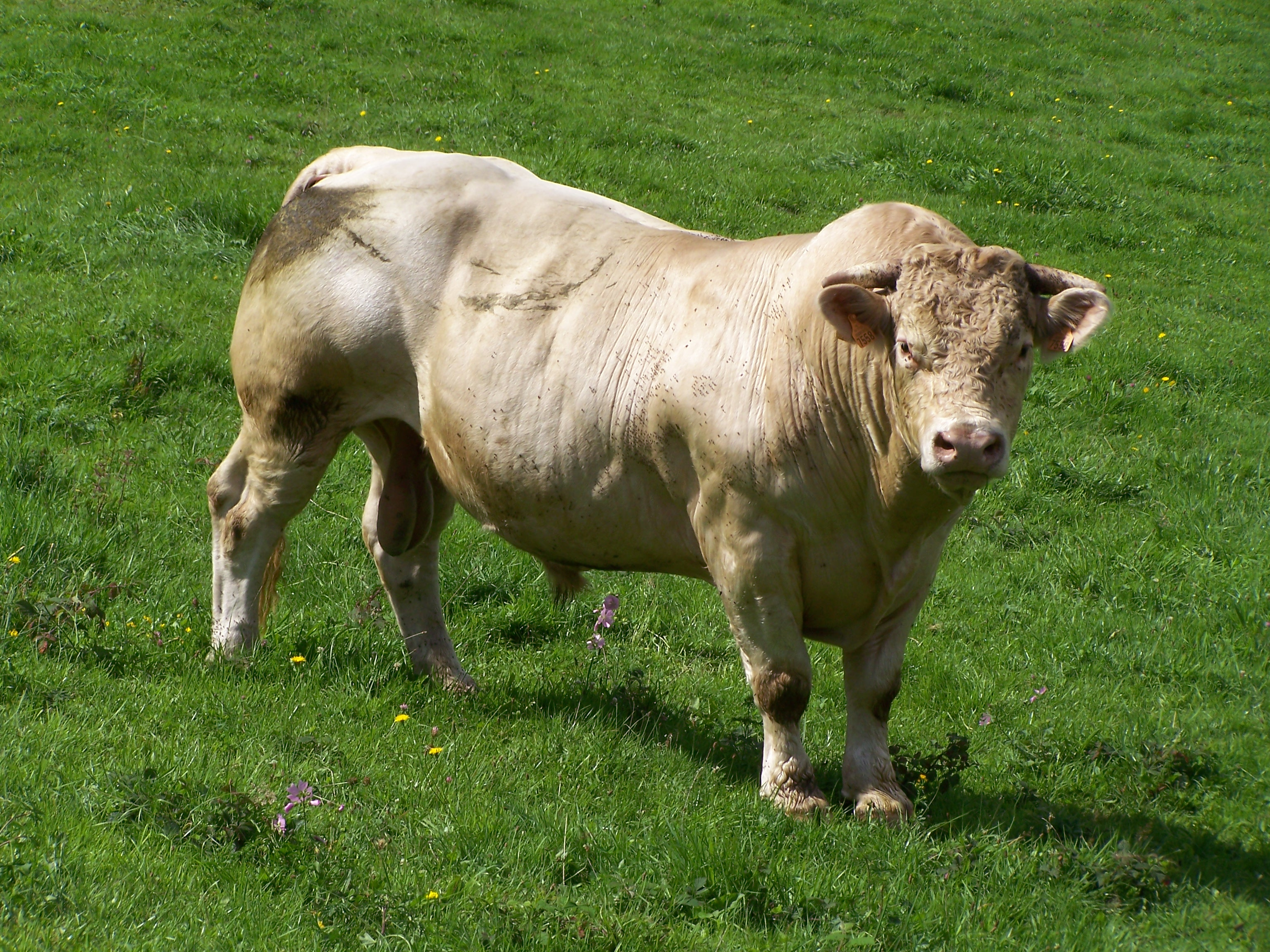
Bull in the Morvan

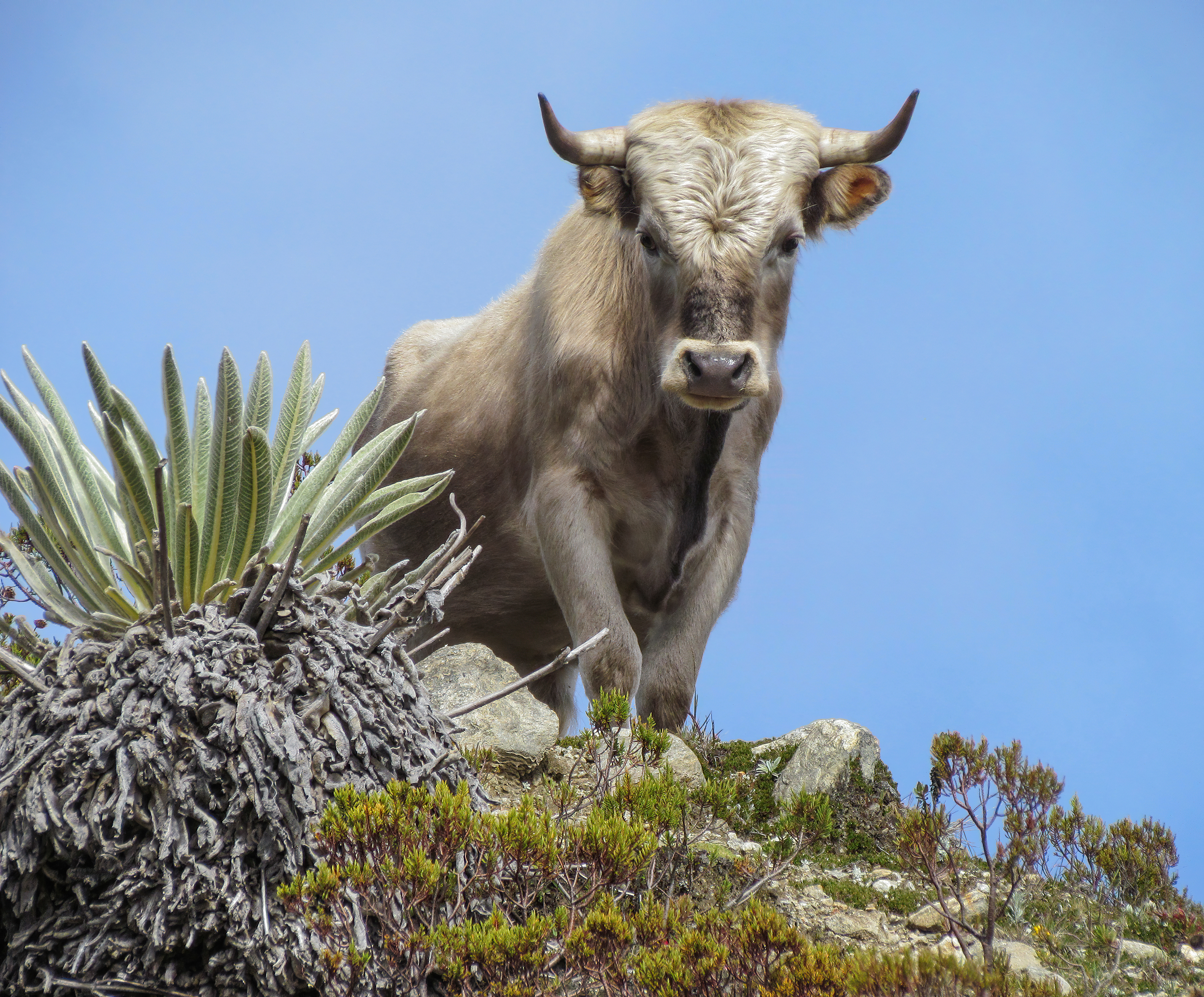
Feral bull in Sierra Nevada de Mérida, Venezuela

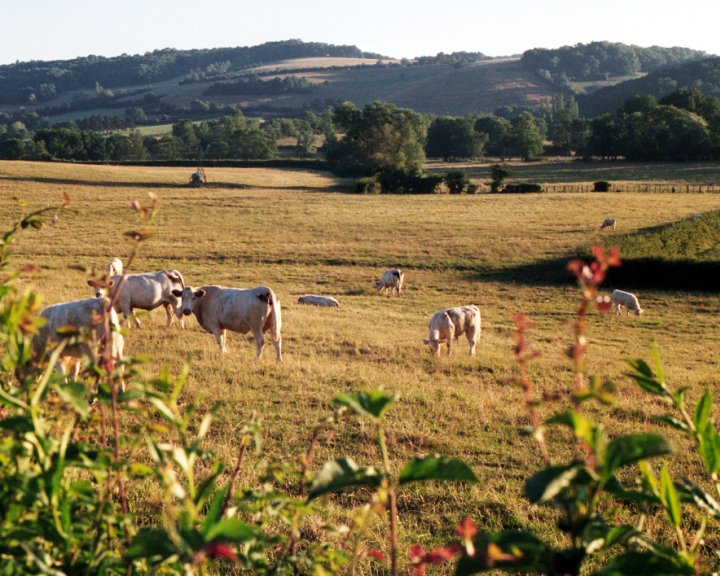
Cows at pasture in Burgundy

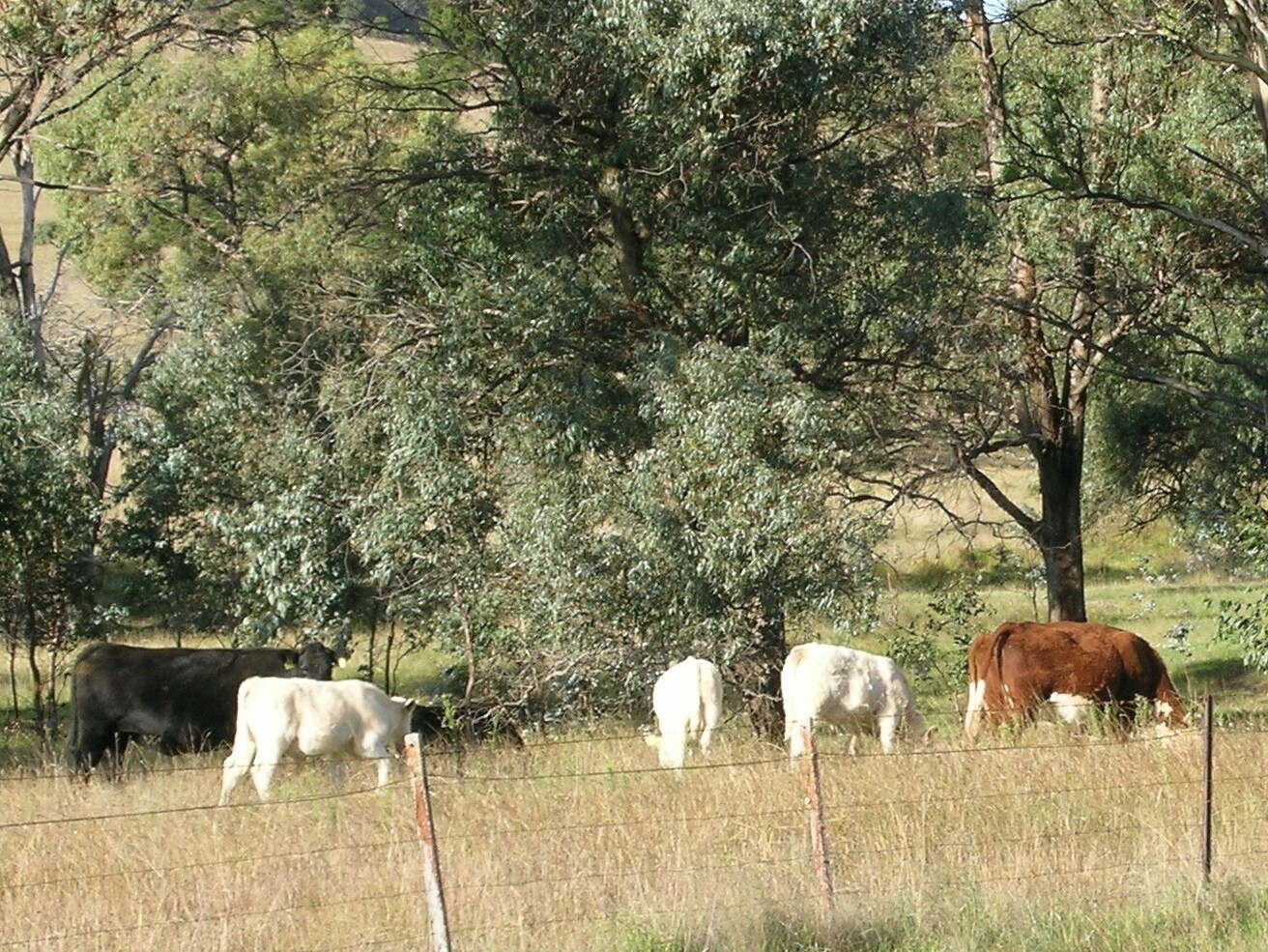
Embryo-transferred calves with their Aberdeen Angus and Hereford recipient dams

== See also ==
- Charolais horse
- Fin gras du Mézenc
