= Australian Charbray =

Breed of cattle

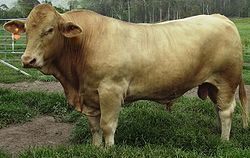
- Other names: Bos taurus taurus x Bos taurus indicus
- Country of origin: Australia
- Distribution: Northern Australia
- Use: Meat

Traits
- Weight: Male: 1000kg; Female: 800kg
- Height: Male: 165cm; Female: 160cm
- Coat: Cream to light-red

The Australian Charbray (Bos taurus x Bos indicus) is an Australian breed of cattle derived from a cross between the French Charolais cattle and American Brahman cattle. The charbray breed was first conceived in the United States of America in the 1930s and later introduced into Australia in 1969. In Australia, Australian charbray breeders are concentrated in the tropical Northern regions of Queensland. As of 1977, the official breeder society of Charbray cattle in Australia and New Zealand is the Charbray Society of Australia Limited, responsible for recording Charbray cattle in herd books, fostering improvement, enhancement and sales of Charbray cattle.

== History ==
The Australian Charbray was first developed in the U.S. in the 1930s and later independently bred and introduced into Australia in the late 1960s. Within an agricultural context, innovation through new technology and practices are upheld by government agencies, breed societies, and agricultural firms. The Australian government during the 1930s-1970s sought to expand cattle in northern Australia, where agricultural activity was sparse due to the tropical conditions unsuited for the beef cattle industry. To address this, the Commonwealth Scientific Industry Research Organisation (CSIRO) had a role in researching livestock breeds that were suited for the northern Australia tropics. This led to an introduction of foreign species and development of crossbreeding programs. However, new breeds had to develop locally in order to prevent diseases such as Blue-Tongue disease in Australian cattle populations, resulting in an embargo to prevent livestock imports.

In the late 1960s, government agricultural deregulation and advancements in breeding technologies allowed for importation of foreign breeds of cattle, for example, the French Charolais, leading to expansion in crossbreeding and cattle species development. Artificial insemination technologies were now the main practice of crossbreeding cattle breeds. The majority of these resulting breeds share common traits relative to market requirements such as high growth rates, greater meat yields per carcass and heat and drought resistant capabilities. These new technologies and practices in agricultural industries were utilised in order to maximise economic returns, increasing efficiency of normal operations and allowing more adapted means of production. The Charbray breed was developed in order to suit the environmental conditions of Northern Queensland and to meet market requirements of a higher meat yield in comparison to growth time. Breeds of cattle were also developed in order to avoid disease and pest risks and to prolong the productivity of beef production.

== Characteristics ==
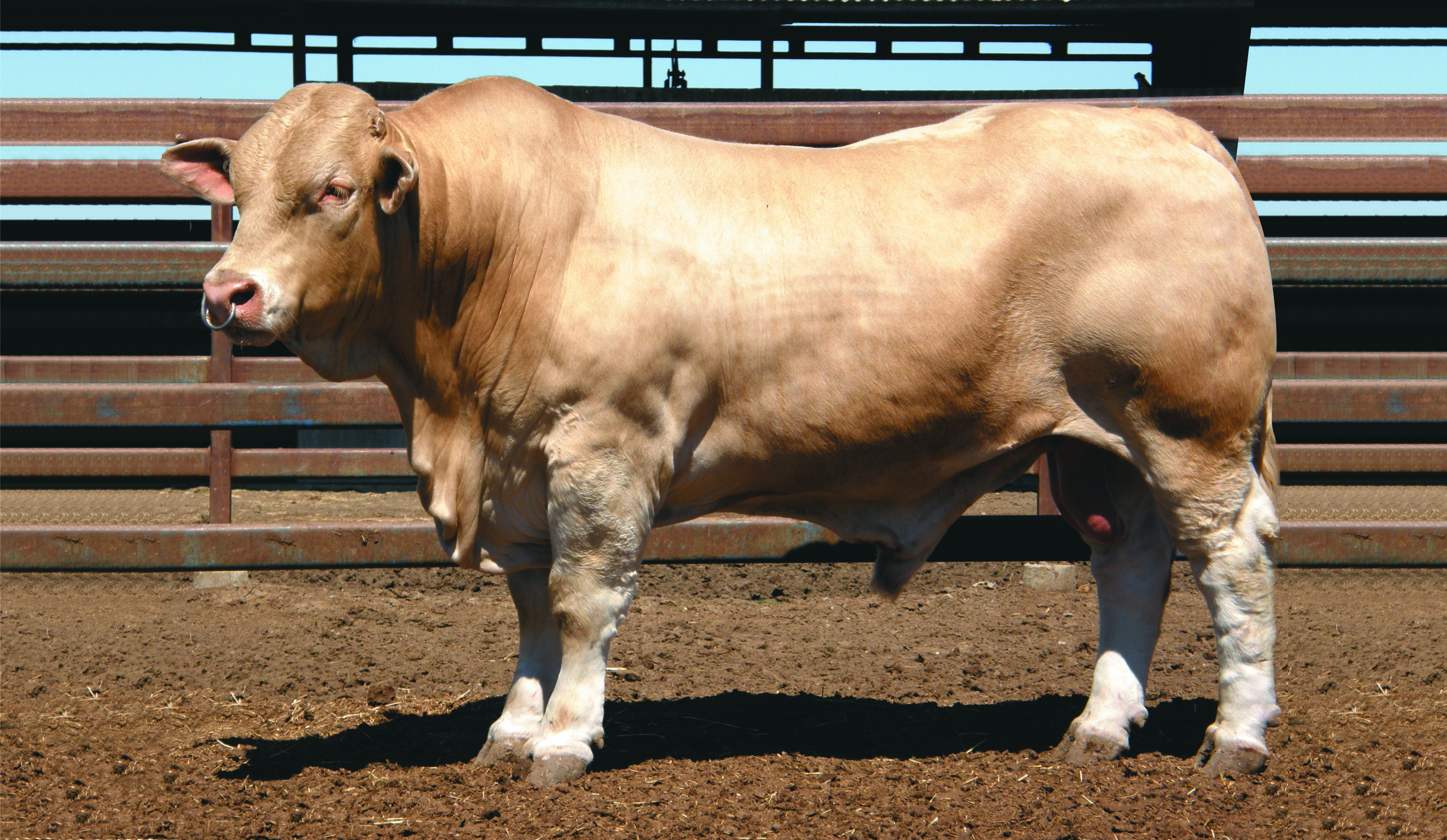
Australian Charbray Bull

The Charbray's distinctive characteristics are a blend between its counterparts, the Charolais and Brahman cattle. The breed typically exhibits a genetic composition of 5/8 Charolais and 3/8 Brahman. Cattle registration with the Charbray Society of Australia Ltd requires at least 25-75% Brahman with Charolais, with differing ratios of each species due to required adaptions to different environmental conditions. The Charbray essentially combines the hardiness and tick resistance of the American Brahman with the lean beef characteristics and docile temperament of the French Charolais.

Physically, the Charbray does not exhibit the indicative hump that the Brahman is known for but has the signature loose skin and excessive dewlap around the underside of the throat. It is a large-bodied breed with a light red to cream coat colour, with wither heights of adult cattle averaging 165 cm (male) and 150 cm (female) and bodyweight averaging 1000 kg (male) and 800 kg (female). Charbray cattle produce carcasses with high meat-yield meeting market requirements and are able to respond to seasonal changes through foraging attributes and hardiness. Charbray calves are born around half the size of a Brahman at a low birth weight reducing risk of calving problems but have a rapid growth rate from high feed-converting ability. Females reach maturity at around 14-17months and calve at age two, achieving high calving rates and milk production. Males are structurally sound and are selected for high fertility, early testicular development and clean, tight sheaths.

=== Charolais Cattle ===
The Charolais cattle was introduced into Australia in 1969 via semen imports from deregulation of livestock imports from overseas. It is considered the first European breed to be established in Australia and was considered well suited to cross with the American Brahman.The Charolais has a distinctive cream or white coat, with a large build, being a heavily muscled cattle that yields heavy, fine-textured and lean carcasses. Cattle mature late and the breed is also suited for bullock production or as a terminal sire in breeding programs to produce Charbray. The breed is selected for the Charbray for its rapid growth and high yield of lean meat with minimal intramuscular fat content, reflected in the Charbray's own characteristics.

=== Brahman Cattle ===
The Brahman cattle was widely introduced into Australia from North America in 1933 as it was a breed well-suited for the tropics for their heat and drought tolerance. They are medium-sized and calves grow into lean-carcass cattle, however its beef quality is inferior to other specialised beef breeds. Upon maturity, the Brahman cows have good milk production and a maternal nature, and demonstrate significant hybrid vigour and hence, used in cross breeding programs to develop the stabilised tropical crossbreed of the Chrabray. Brahman cattle found in the Southern regions of North America showcase high heat tolerance, resistance to external and internal parasites, adaptability to fibrous forage and ability to withstand higher levels of UV radiation and humidity. Hence, they are well suited to be crossbred to produce the Charbray cattle in the Northern tropical environments of Australia.

== Breeding ==
Charbray cattle were first bred in order to achieve the high growth rate and maturity of the Charolais cattle with the hardiness of the Brahmans, ensuring easy calving and decent weight gain. This is achieved through the process of cross breeding the French Charolais bull with the American Brahman cow in order to improve growth, beef quality and adaptability in beef production systems. Crossbreeding Bos indicus and Bos taurus breeds maximises genetic gains through a process called heterosis (hybrid vigour), which increases the productive potential of the Charbray through a combination of Charolais and Brahman genes. Complementarity can be exploited using crossbreeding methods in order to increase beef productivity. This is achieved by using optimal genetic mixes of cattle in order to showcase hybrid vigour. Desired traits are combined to improve market flexibility and to maximise productive capacity of cattle populations in tropical Northern Australia. Bulls with superior growth or meat quality are used in crossbreeding programs to produce the Charbray cattle, demonstrating efficient use of genetic technologies to increase cattle yield in a shorter period.

Australia has a long history in adapting imported breeds to a wide variety of production environments. The genera and breeds of livestock in demand and suitable for agricultural production have primarily been imported into Australia from Europe or Northern America. Following importation they have been developed and adapted by selection and some crossing to suit the prevailing environmental conditions and market requirements. Quality and productivity of the Charbray breed is up-kept by the associated breed society, the Charbray Society of Australia Ltd., who develop and oversee selection schemes and performance testing for different traits. Genetic selection using modern genetic evaluation systems can be achieved through extensive selection and performance recording for cattle breed-plans that most efficiently meet current market needs.

Crossbreeding between the Charolais and the Brahman cattle is necessary in order to address the numerous stressors in tropical and subtropical environments in Northern Australia. These stressors include ectoparasites (such as cattle ticks and biting insects), endoparasites (such as gastrointestinal worms), seasonally deficient nutrition, hot and humid environments, and other pathogenic diseases. These stressors have varying impacts depending on cattle breed, however, the impact on reproduction and animal welfare of the cattle is multiplicative rather than solely additive. Cattle with underlying health issues and psychological stress experience a stronger reaction to additional stressors and treatment is less likely to be successful. Management strategies for stressors are inefficient for tropical environments, and so crossbreeding is used to identify beneficial traits in different breeds that can overcome these. Cattle populations are dependent on the establishment of well-defined objectives in crossbreeding, ensuring production is optimal in changing physical and economic environments. Apart from the ultimate objective of higher output per unit output in Charbray production, improved well-being relative to hardiness, longevity, and increased growth rates are achieved. Development of reproductive technologies in the mid-twentieth to twenty-first century have increased cattle populations, meeting growing market demand for beef globally.

=== Artificial Insemination ===
Crossbreeding of the Charolais bull and Brahman cow is successfully carried out by a process called artificial insemination. It involves manually placing bull semen into the uterus of a recipient cow. Artificial insemination allows for the selection of desirable traits in both the bull and cow to be displayed in heterosis, increasing the viability of the cattle breed and ensuring optimal breed characteristics from both maternal and paternal lineages. Artificial insemination in crossbreeding allows for:

- Increased efficiency of bull usage, as bull semen is collected and cryopreserved in order to limit the physical stress of producing large amounts at a time. Collected semen can be transported with ease and can be used on multiple cows and heifers in heat
- Increased safety for cattle and farmers; allows for the avoidance of aggressive bulls in heat and the eliminates the risk of injury for cows during natural mating
- Genetic selection in which the most desirable bull in terms of physical state, fertility and temperament is used to inseminate corresponding cows to produce the Charbray cross
- Decreased costs.

Artificial insemination requires cows to be oestrus, showing specific behaviour that indicates that they are in heat. The definitive sign is that the cow will stand to be mounted by the bull which can be detected visually or by using tail paint and pressure mounts, but this varies depending on other stressors. The cow should then be artificially inseminated 8-12hours after this is observed. Cows may not resume regular fertile oestrous cycles, but the use of hormones such as progesterone can stimulate the resumption of normal oestrous cycles. There are a few differences in reproductive physiology that may arise in Bos indicus and Bos taurus cattle, in which the former takes longer to resume normal cycling and indicates less noticeable oestrous behaviour.

Artificial insemination is a biotechnology widely used to improve production of cattle in agriculture, using selection methods that ensure optimal fertility and breeding outcomes. The fertility of the Charolais bull is an important factor as defective semen quality can contribute to reproductive failure, accounting for approximately 5-20% of embryo deaths by day 8 of development. This is addressed using post-thaw semen evaluation and analysis of sperm characteristics do determine and assess bull fertility before inseminating. Assessment is possible as bull sperm of healthy Charolais exhibit superior cryoresistance from their physiology, biochemistry and structure, allowing sperm to survive for longer periods. Worldwide distribution of bull semen in cryopreserved semen straws have been observed. Similarly, in Brahman cows, approximately +90% of oocytes complete nuclear maturation, with around 80% being successfully fertilised, and a third reaching the late developmental stages into a blastocyst.

Artificial insemination programs are successful depending on a number of factors. A potential 100% pregnancy rate is reduced if cows do not respond to hormones and fertilisation attempts, as well as incorrect timing of the oestrous cycle. Cows must be in good health and handled correctly to reduce stress, and correct storage, usage and administration of drugs must occur to increase success rates. Semen should be handled, stored, thawed and inserted into the cow correctly following guidelines in order to increase chances of fertilisation and minimise injury for the cow.

== Industry ==
Since the mid-1970s, Australian cattle industry has become internationally competitive and improved efficiency and productivity in livestock rearing. The gross value of the Australian cattle and calf production totalled $14.3billion in 2015–16, which is approximately 50% of total value of Australian livestock industries. A regional report on the Northern Australian beef industry indicates that by 1996–97, 10% of the North-West herd were Charbray out of the 23 different bull breeds. In 2015, tropical breeds accounted for 5.5% of new tropical breed calves registered and 1.7% of total calves registered.

As of September 2020, the prevalence of the Charbray as a mainstream breed in Northern Queensland is demonstrated by a strong demand for Charbray bulls. At the 43rd annual Charbray sale held at the CQLX in Gracemere, all of the 54 Charbray bulls for sale were bought, with the highest price at AUD40,000 and an average price of AUD8,880. The previous year, 2019, saw the top price of AUD26,000 and an average of AUD7,186 with an 87 percent clearance of bulls for sale.

== See also ==
http://www.charbray.org/
