= Indu-Brasil =

Brazilian breed of beef cattle

- Conservation status: FAO (2007): not at risk; DAD-IS (2023): at risk/endangered
- Other names: Indubrasil; Indo-Brazilian; Induberaba; Indoanaxa
- Country of origin: Brazil
- Distribution: Minas Gerais
- Standard: Associação Brasileira dos Criadores de Indubrasil

Traits
- Weight: Male: 900–1200 kg; Female: 750–900 kg
- Height: Male: average 161 cm; Female: average 143 cm
- Coat: white or pale grey
- Horn status: horned

The Indu-Brasil or Indo-Brazilian is a Brazilian breed of zebuine beef cattle. It was bred in the early twentieth century in the Triângulo Mineiro in the western part of Minas Gerais state, and particularly in the area surrounding Uberaba. It was originally known as the Induberaba. It derives from imported Indian zebuine cattle, principally Gir and Kankrej (which in Brazil are known as Guzerá). It was formerly an important beef breed, but in the twenty-first century is an endangered breed. It is characterised by particularly large ears, perhaps the largest seen in any breed of cattle.

== History ==
The Indu-Brasil derives from zebuine cattle imported to Brazil from India, principally of Kankrej stock (known in Brazil as Guzerá), Ongole (known in Brazil as Nellore) and Gir stock. It was bred in the early twentieth century in the Triângulo Mineiro in the western part of Minas Gerais state, and particularly in the area surrounding Uberaba, which gave rise to its original name, Induberaba; the name was changed to the present one in 1936. A breed association was started in 1939 and another, the Associação Brasileira dos Criadores de Indubrasil, was established in 1962.

It was formerly an important beef breed; in 1991 a breeding stock of 80000 cows was reported to the DAD-IS database of the Food and Agriculture Organization of the United Nations. In the twenty-first century it is an endangered breed: a total population in Brazil of approximately 900 head was reported to DAD-IS for 2017, for 2020 and for 2021. The breed is reported by fourteen countries, all in Central or South America; the largest population is in Mexico, where in 2022 the breeding stock numbered 4120 head – 2492 cows and 1348 bulls.

It was among the breeds that contributed to the development of the American Brahman breed in the United States. At the Universidad Nacional Autónoma de México in Mexico City it has been selectively bred since the 1970s for small size, leading to the development of the Minivaca, a dwarf breed standing about 100 cm tall.

== Characteristics ==
The cattle have good heat and parasite resistance and thrive in the tropics. They are white to dark grey in colour with short horns and very large ears. They have the typical Zebu shoulder hump.

== Use ==
From about 1925 to 1945 the Indu-Brasil was the dominant beef breed of Brazil; it remained important in beef production until the 1970s.
