= Ataenius pereirai =

Scientific classification
- Kingdom: Animalia
- Phylum: Arthropoda
- Clade: Pancrustacea
- Class: Insecta
- Order: Coleoptera
- Suborder: Polyphaga
- Infraorder: Scarabaeiformia
- Family: Scarabaeidae
- Genus: Ataenius
- Species: A. pereirai

Binomial name
- Ataenius pereirai Petrovitz, 1970

Species of beetle

Ataenius pereirai is a species of beetle of the family Scarabaeidae. It is found in Brazil (Bahia, Distrito Federal, Goiás, Mato Grosso, Mato Grosso do Sul, Minas Gerais, Rio de Janeiro, São Paulo, Tocantins).

== Description ==
Adults reach a length of about 2.6–2.8 mm (0.10–0.11 in). They have an oblong oval, moderately shining rusty brown body, with the ventral surface yellowish brown.

== Life history ==
Specimens have been collected in pastures with Brachiaria decumbens, and have been found in cow dung and in Guzera droppings.
