= Ataenius aequalis =

Scientific classification
- Kingdom: Animalia
- Phylum: Arthropoda
- Clade: Pancrustacea
- Class: Insecta
- Order: Coleoptera
- Suborder: Polyphaga
- Infraorder: Scarabaeiformia
- Family: Scarabaeidae
- Genus: Ataenius
- Species: A. aequalis

Binomial name
- Ataenius aequalis Harold, 1880

Synonyms
- Ataenius titschacki Balthasar, 1941; Ataenius insulicola Chapin, 1940

Species of beetle

Ataenius aequalis is a species of beetle of the family Scarabaeidae. It is found in Argentina, Belize, Bolivia, Brazil (Acre, Amazonas, Bahia, Distrito Federal, Espírito Santo, Goiás, Mato Grosso, Mato Grosso do Sul, Minas Gerais, Pará, Paraná, Pernambuco, Piauí, Rondônia, Roraima, São Paulo), Colombia, Costa Rica, El Salvador, Guadeloupe, Guatemala, Guyana, Honduras, Mexico (Chiapas, Guerrero, Nuevo León, Oaxaca, Veracruz), Nicaragua, Panama, Trinidad & Tobago, Venezuela, Saint Vincent and in the United States (Louisiana).

== Description ==
Adults reach a length of about 3.5–5 mm (0.14–0.20 in). They have an oblong-oval, convex, weakly shiny body. They are usually piceous, but extremely variable.

== Life history ==
Specimens have been collected in woodland areas in litter at forest edges, as well as in excrements on pastures and in Nelore droppings, in fungi and under bark, as well as from Typhonium trilobatum.
