= Ataenius scutellaris =

Scientific classification
- Kingdom: Animalia
- Phylum: Arthropoda
- Clade: Pancrustacea
- Class: Insecta
- Order: Coleoptera
- Suborder: Polyphaga
- Infraorder: Scarabaeiformia
- Family: Scarabaeidae
- Genus: Ataenius
- Species: A. scutellaris

Binomial name
- Ataenius scutellaris Harold, 1867

Synonyms
- Ataenius auberti Paulian, 1937; Ataenius frater Arrow, 1903

Species of beetle

Ataenius scutellaris is a species of beetle of the family Scarabaeidae.

== Description ==
Adults reach a length of about 4–4.8 mm (0.16–0.19 in). They have a shining, carbon black or piceous body.

== Distribution ==
Neotropical: Antigua, Bahamas, Barbados, Brazil (Acre, Amazonas, Goiás, Mato Grosso do Sul, Minas Gerais, Pará, Rondônia, São Paulo), Colombia, Dominican Republic, Ecuador, French Guiana, Grenada, Guatemala, Hispaniola, Honduras, Jamaica, Lesser Antilles, Martinique, Mexico (Chiapas, Guerrero, Jalisco, Morelos, Puebla, Veracruz), Montserrat, Nicaragua, Panama, Peru, Puerto Rico, Saint Croix, Saint Kitts and Nevis, Saint Thomas, Saint Vincent, Suriname, Tortola, Trinidad & Tobago, Venezuela. Oriental: India, Malaysia, Mascarenes, Seychelles, Vanuatu. Madagascan: Madagascar.

== Life history ==
Specimens have been collected in forests and in pasture areas, where it may be found in human excrements, as well as in bovine and Guzera droppings.
