= Ataenius crenulatus =

Scientific classification
- Kingdom: Animalia
- Phylum: Arthropoda
- Clade: Pancrustacea
- Class: Insecta
- Order: Coleoptera
- Suborder: Polyphaga
- Infraorder: Scarabaeiformia
- Family: Scarabaeidae
- Genus: Ataenius
- Species: A. crenulatus

Binomial name
- Ataenius crenulatus Schmidt, 1910

Synonyms
- Ataenius rickardsi Hinton, 1938

Species of beetle

Ataenius crenulatus is a species of beetle of the family Scarabaeidae. It is found in Argentina, Belize, Bolivia, Brazil (Amazonas, Bahia, Distrito Federal, Goiás, Maranhão, Mato Grosso, Mato Grosso do Sul, Minas Gerais, Pará, Paraíba, Paraná, Rio Grande do Sul, Santa Catarina, São Paulo, Tocantins), Colombia, Honduras, Mexico (Chiapas, Oaxaca, Tamaulipas, Veracruz, Yucatán), Paraguay, Uruguay and Venezuela.

== Description ==
Adults reach a length of about 3.8–5 mm (0.15–0.20 in). They have an elongate-oblong, dark brown to piceous, mat body.

== Life history ==
Specimens have been collected in various biotopes. They might be found in cattle and horse dung and in Guzera droppings on pastures with Brachiaria decumbens and Cenchrus clandestinus, but also in wet forests and in open grassy forests, in litter of thorny scrubs, under tree bark and in beach debris.
