= Viatina-19 FIV Mara Imóveis =

Brazilian cow

Viatina-19 FIV Mara Imóveis is a Brazilian Nelore cow valued at US$4.9 million. After one-third of her ownership was sold for $1.44 million in 2023, her valuation was placed at $4.9 million, making her one of the most expensive cows in the world. Viatina-19's genetic materials, which are being sold for $250,000 per egg cell, are expected to be used to produce offspring that will carry her genetic traits.
