= Kankrej =

Breed of cattle

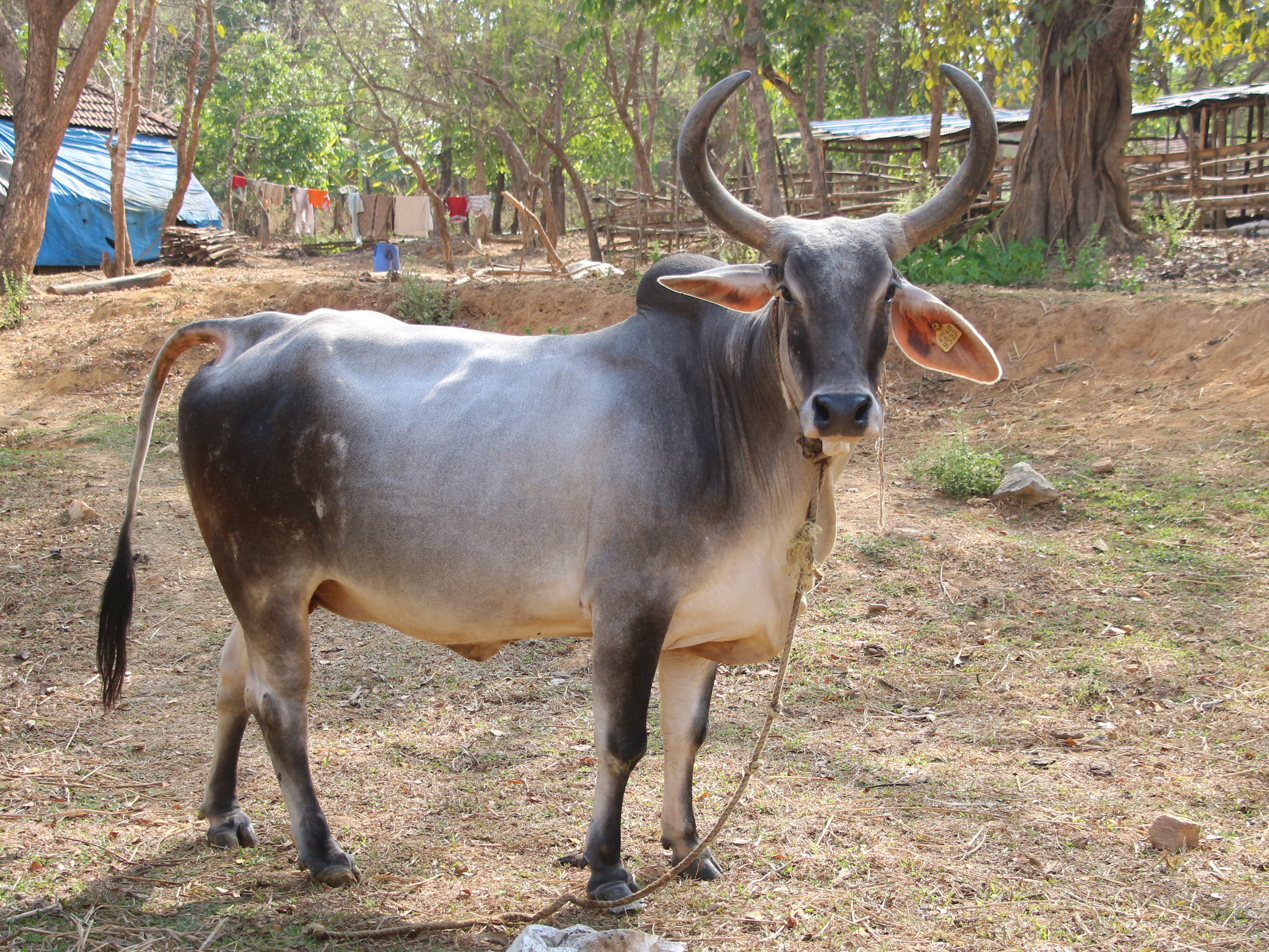
- A cow

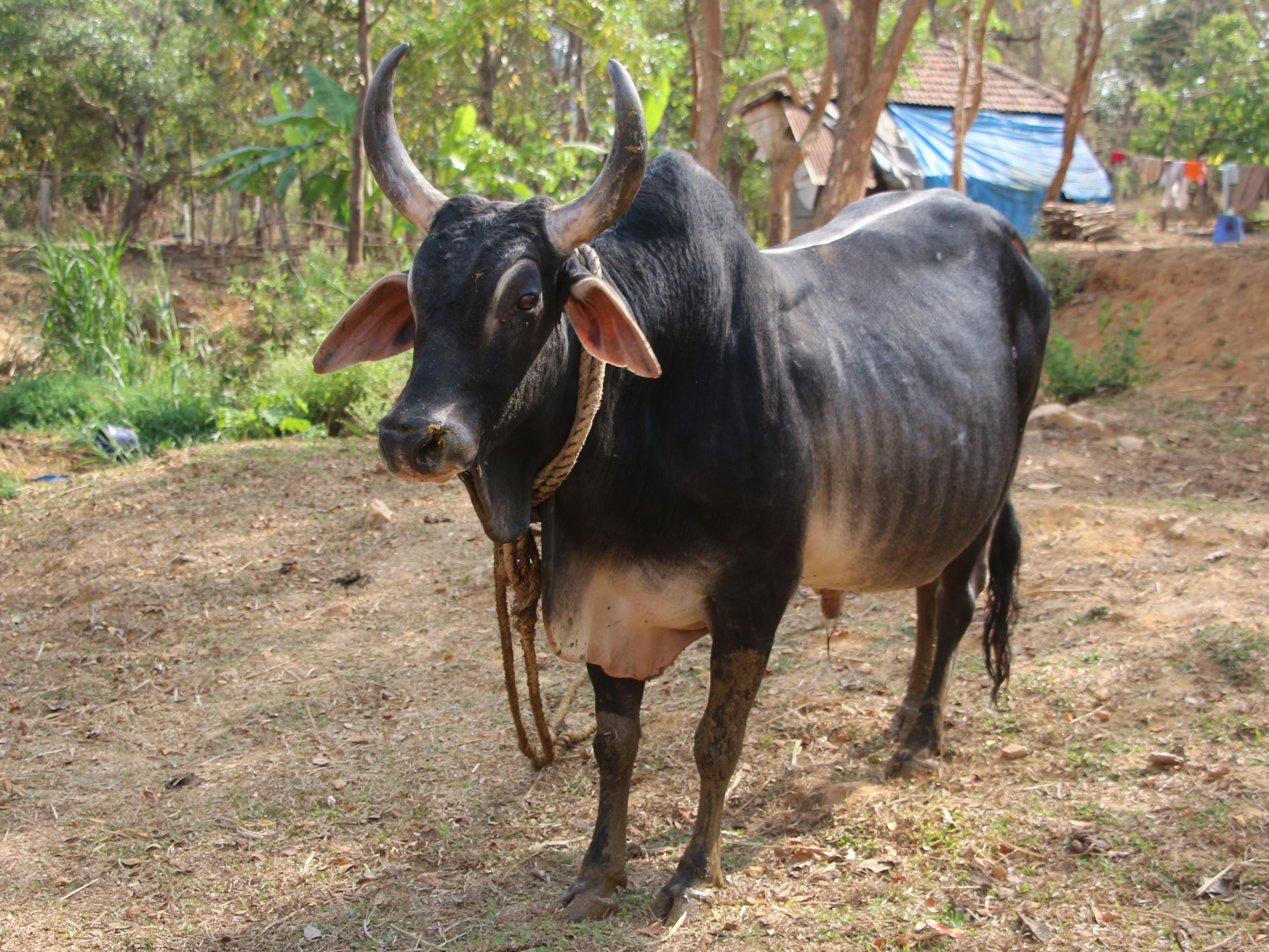
- A bull
- Conservation status: FAO (2007): not at risk; DAD-IS (2026): not at risk
- Other names: Kankaraj; Bannai; Nagar; Talabda; Vadhiyar; Vagadia; Wagad; Waged; Wadhiar; Wadhir; Wadial
- Country of origin: India; Pakistan
- Distribution: Gujarat, India; Rajasthan, India; Tharparkar District, Sindh, Pakistan
- Use: milk, draught

Traits
- Weight: Male: average 590 kg; Female: average 431 kg
- Skin colour: dark
- Coat: grey, from silver to dark
- Horn status: horned in both sexes
- Cattle; Bos (primigenius) indicus

The Kankrej is an Indian and Pakistani breed of zebuine cattle. It originates from the arid region of the Rann of Kutch in the state of Gujarat, and in neighbouring Rajasthan. Under the name Kankaraj, it is also present in Tharparkar District, in Sindh, Pakistan. It is also known by the names Bannai, Nagar, Talabda, Vadhiyar, Vagadia, Wagad, Waged, Wadhiar, Wadhir and Wadial. It is a dual-purpose breed, used both for draught work and for milk production.

== History ==
From about 1870 onwards, Kankrej bulls and cows were exported to Brazil, where they were used to create the Guzerá breed, which was later among the breeds from which the American Brahman developed.

The last official census data for the Kankrej population in India dates from 1977, when there were 465000. In Pakistan the population was recorded in 2006 at 273000 head. In India a population of 1.58 to 2.22 million is reported for 2022; the conservation status of the breed is listed as "not at risk".

== Gallery ==
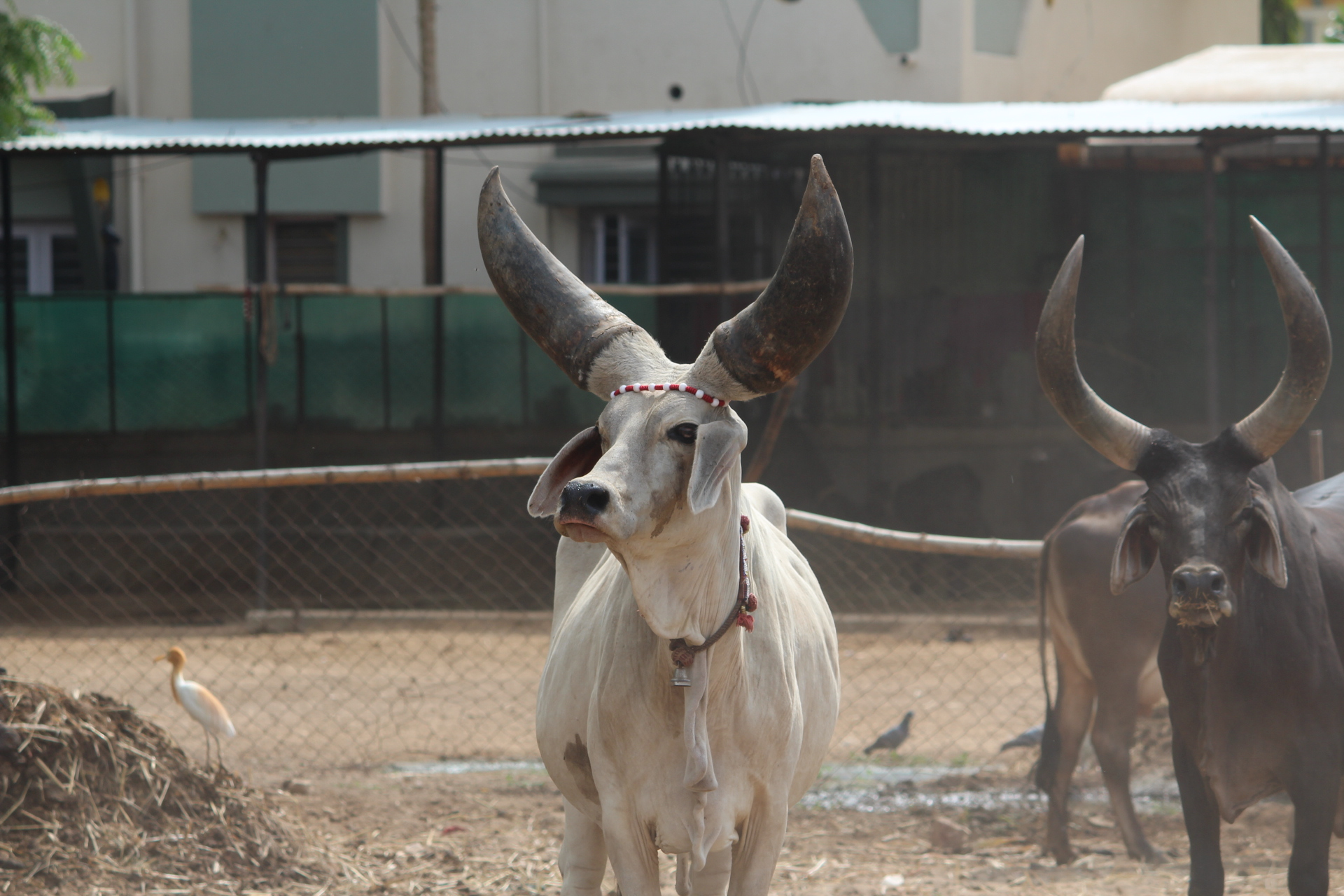
A cow with large horns

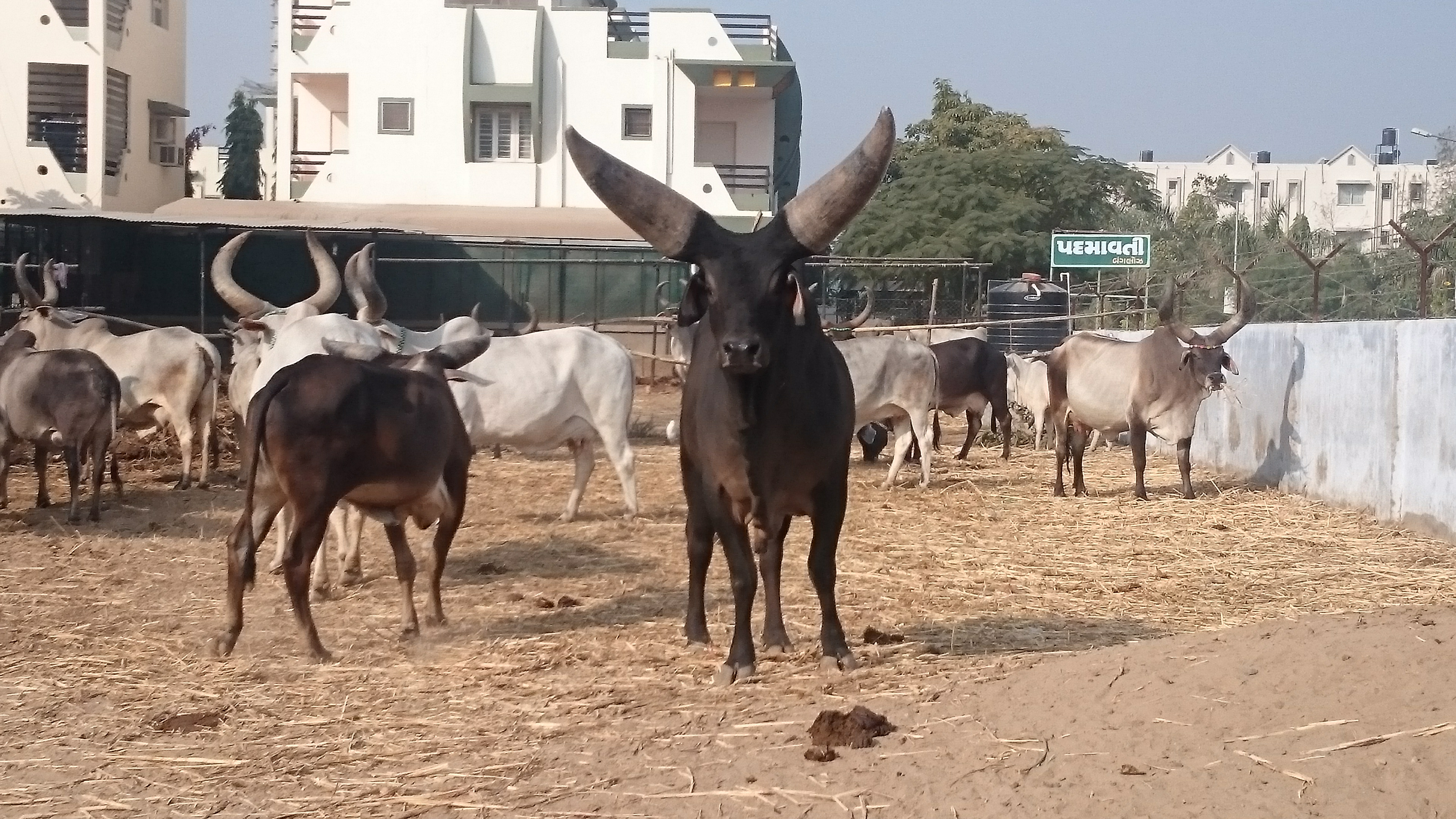
A bull with large horns
