= Ongole cattle =

Indian breed of cattle

Ongole
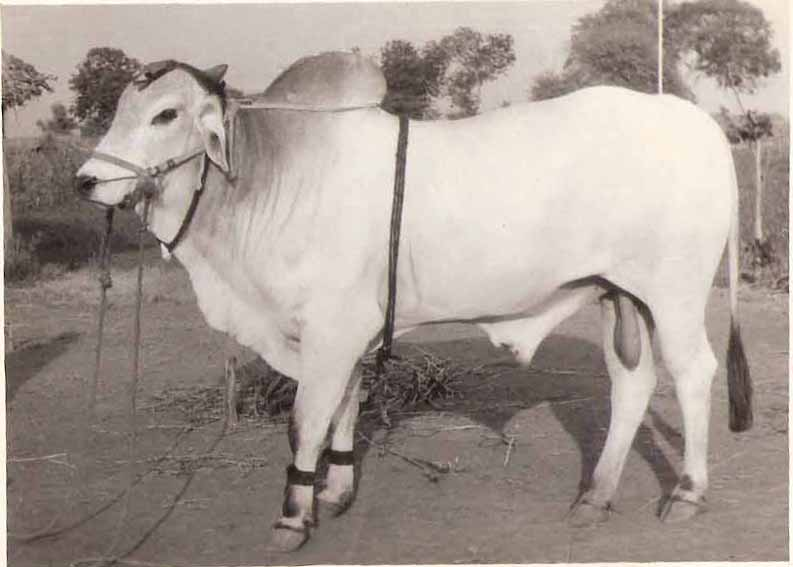
- Conservation status: FAO (2007): not at risk; DAD-IS (2026): not at risk
- Other names: Nellore
- Country of origin: India
- Distribution: Cuba; Indonesia
- Use: draught animal; bull racing; bull fighting

Traits
- Weight: Male: 570 kg; Female: 268 kg
- Height: Male: 150 cm; Female: 130 cm
- Skin colour: pigmented, dark
- Coat: white or light grey; black markings on head, neck, hump, and feet
- Horn status: horned (short, thick, stumpy)
- Cattle; Bos (primigenius) indicus

The Ongole is an Indian breed of zebuine cattle. It originates in what is now Prakasam District in the state of Andhra Pradesh in south-east India, and is named for the city of Ongole, the capital of that district. Because Ongole taluk was formerly in Nellore District, it was at one time known as the Nellore. It is the southernmost of the short-horned zebu group of breeds.

The Ongole has contributed to the development of several breeds in other countries, among them the American Brahman of the United States and the Nelore of Brazil, which numbers many millions; (Note: In 2024 a population of just over 7.5 million was reported) some native Indian stock has been sold in Brazil for very high prices.

== History ==
The Ongole is a traditional breed of zebuine cattle of the state of Andhra Pradesh, and is named for the city of Ongole, the capital of Prakasam District of the state. Because Ongole taluk was formerly in Nellore District, it was at one time known as the Nellore. It is the southernmost of the short-horned zebu group of breeds.

In 1858 a show of the cattle was organised by the district collector of Nellore district at Addanki; it was held annually for a further eleven years until 1872. In 1981 it was revived after a void of almost fifty years; it was held again in Guntur in 1997. A breed society, the Indian Ongole Cattle Breeders' Association, was formed in 1981.

Stock has been exported at various times to several countries, among them Brazil, Fiji, Indonesia, Sri Lanka, the United States and various countries in South-East Asia; in the twenty-first century it is reported to DAD-IS by India, Cuba and the Philippines – where it has given rise to two local sub-breeds, the Peranakan Ongole and the Sumba Ongole. It has contributed to the development of several breeds in other countries, among them the American Brahman and Santa Gertrudis in the United States and – notably – the Nelore of Brazil, which numbers many millions.

The mascot (Veera) for the 2002 National Games of India was a human figure with the head and tail of a bull, supposedly of this breed. In 2024 an Ongole cow was sold for $4.82 million (approximately ₹41 crore) at an auction in Brazil, the highest price on record for a cow.

== Characteristics ==
The cattle are predominantly white, although red and red-and-white animals can occur; males may have grey markings on the forequarters – the head, neck, shoulders and hump; there may be black markings on the legs. Average body weights are 268 kg for cows and 570 kg for males; average heights are 130 cm and 150 cm respectively.

The cattle are well adapted to tropical conditions and have some resistance to insect-borne disease.

== Use ==
The cattle are bred principally for draught work in agriculture and transport; the oxen are powerful and capable of heavy work, but are slow.

Cows are commonly kept also for milk. Yields of 407–778 kg in a lactation varying from 179 to 261 days were reported in 2000, substantially lower than the yields of 1136–1591 kg reported in the mid-twentieth century. The fat content of the milk varies from 3% to 5%.

== Gallery ==
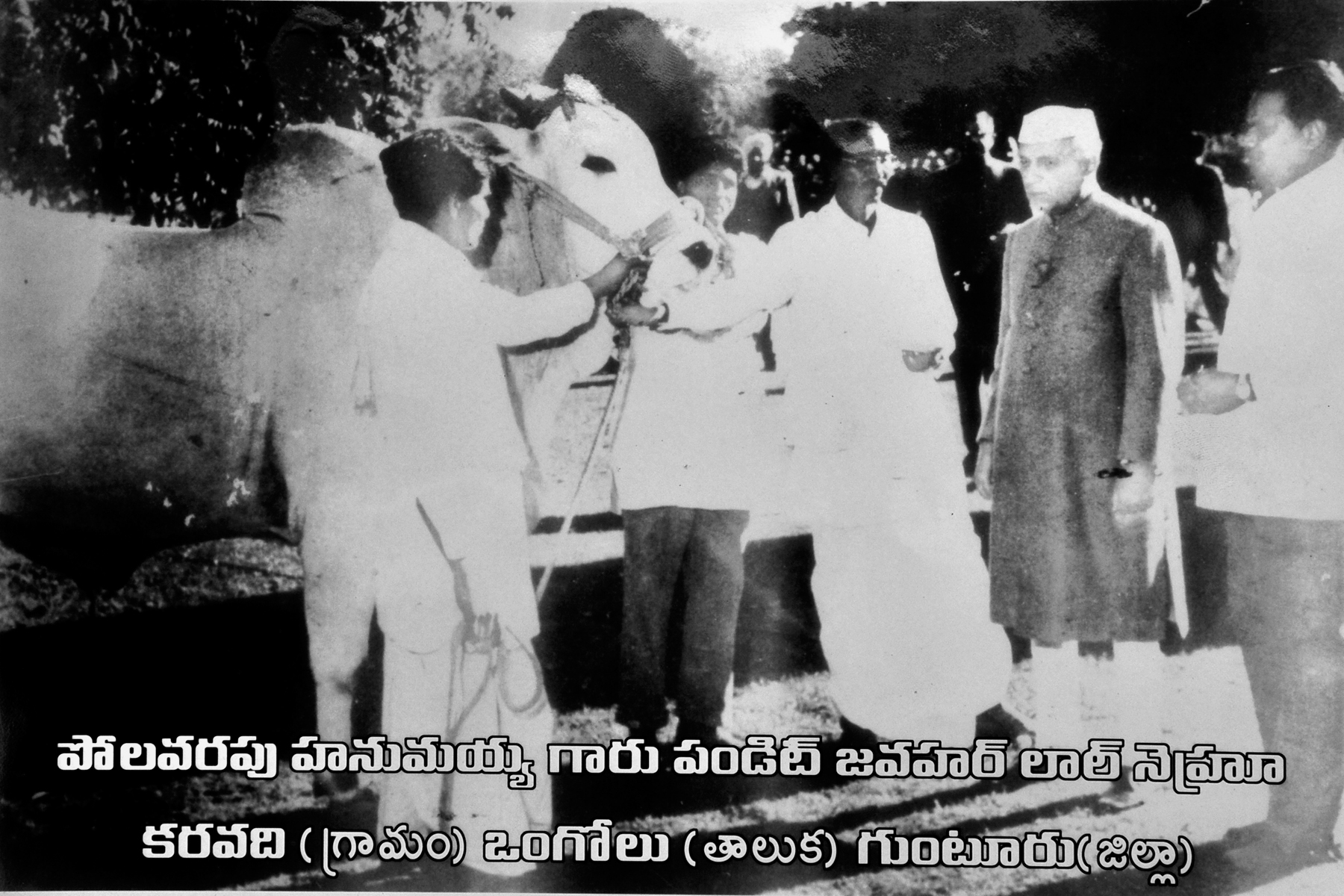
Bull, winner of National Award 1961-1962

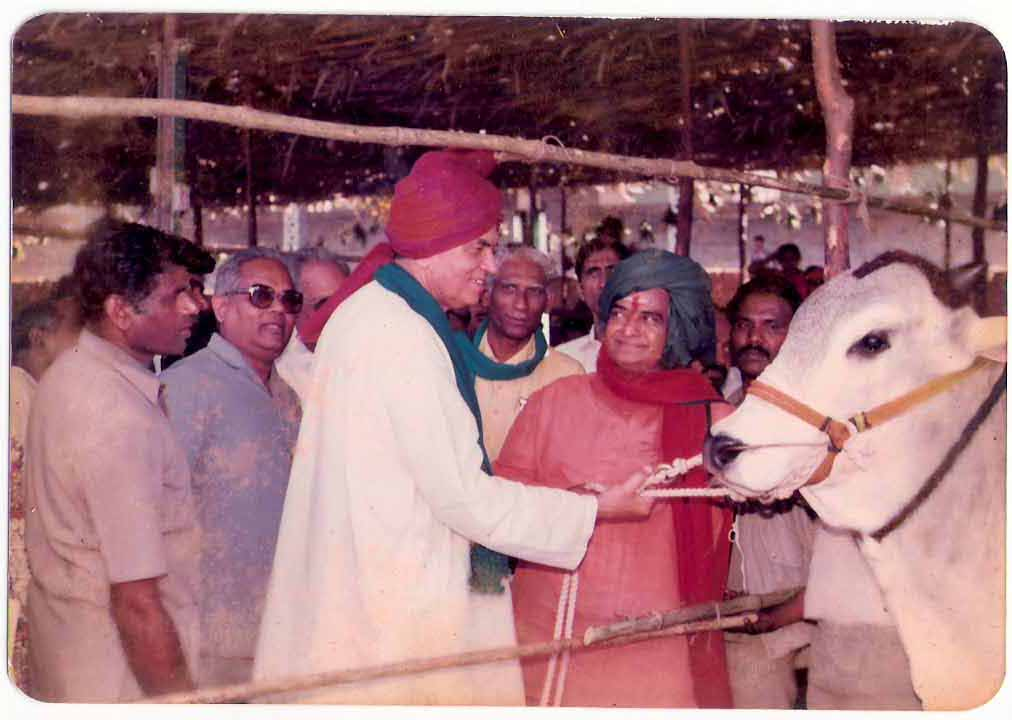
Bull reared by D.T. Moses at Pernamitta

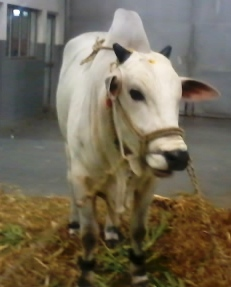
Young bull

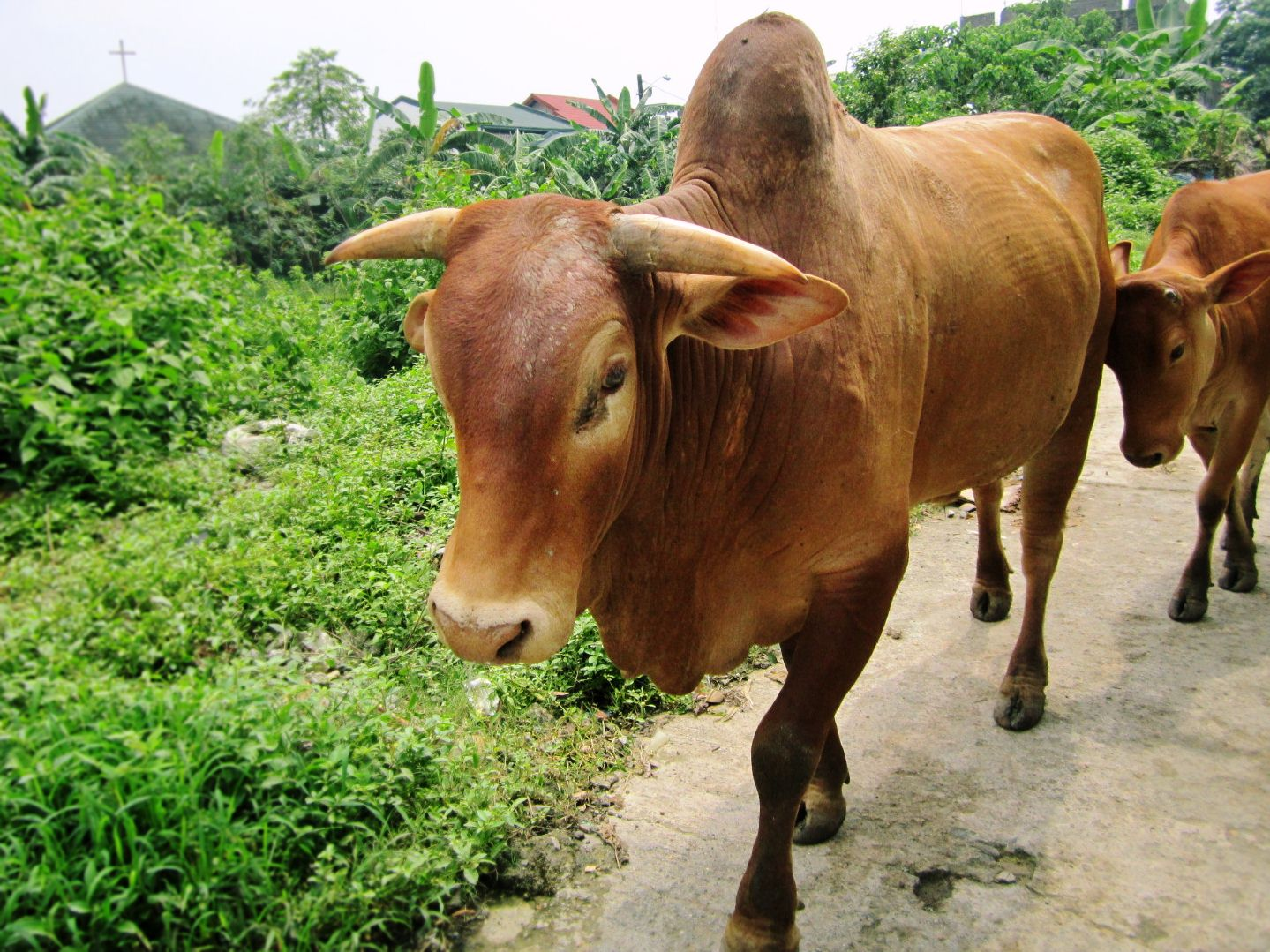
Bull in the Philippines

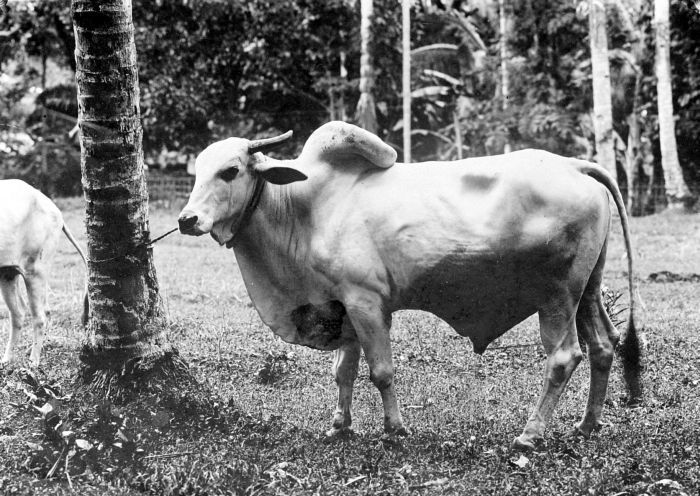
