= American Brahman =

American breed of cattle

Brahman
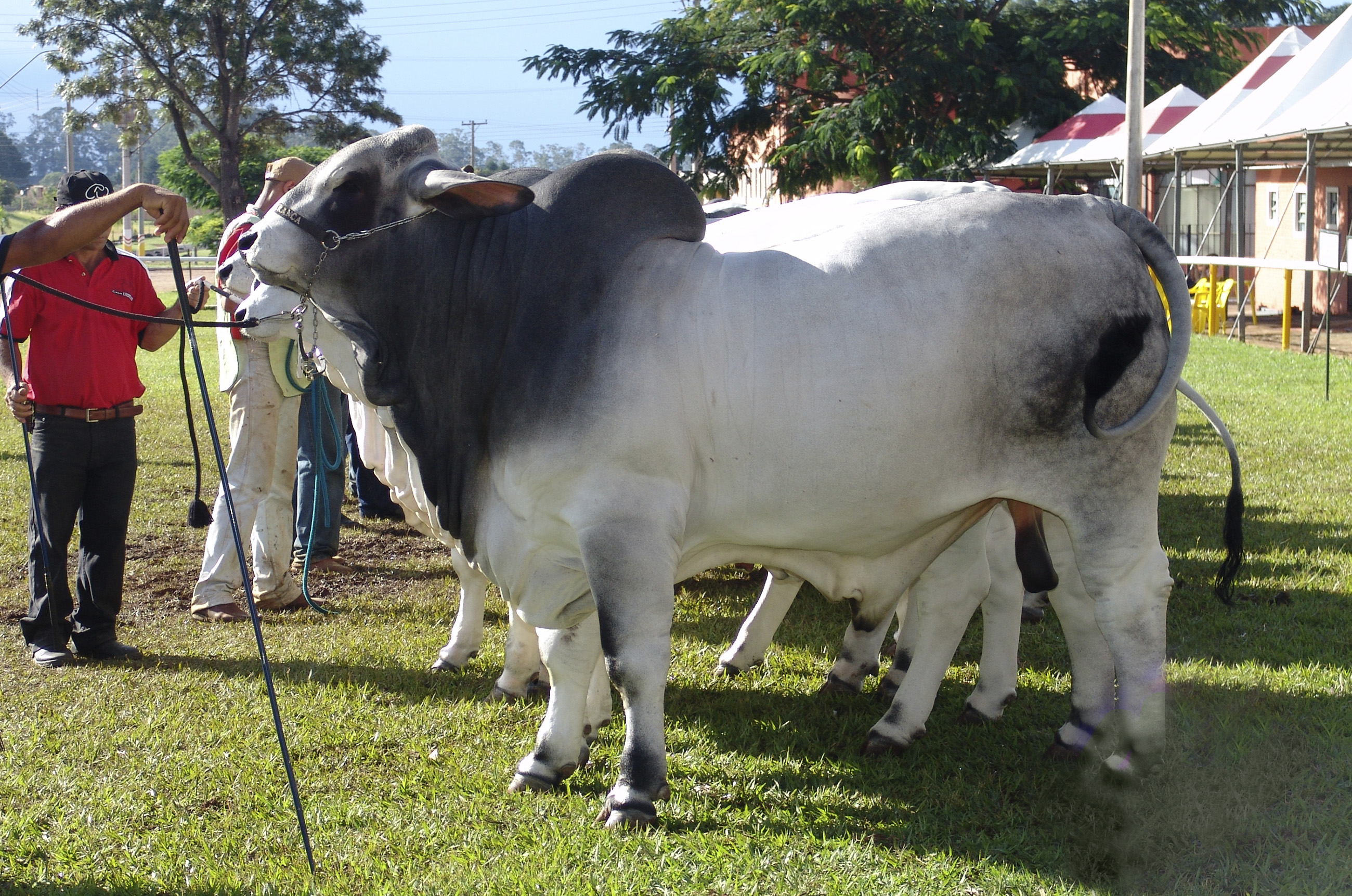
- Bull in Avaré, Brazil

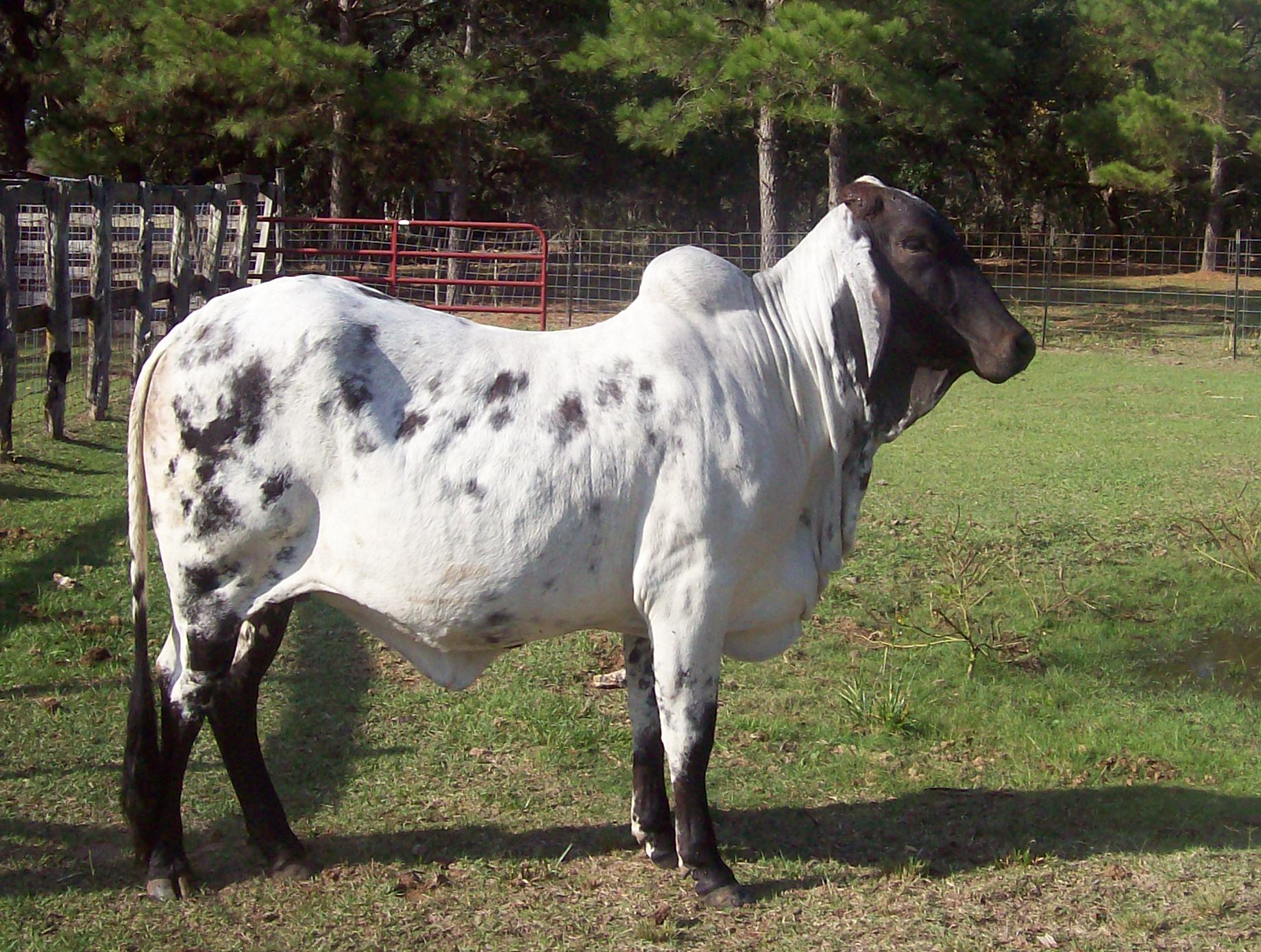
- A cow
- Conservation status: FAO (2007): not at risk
- Other names: Brahma; Brahman
- Country of origin: United States
- Distribution: Australia; Brazil; Mexico; United States
- Standard: American Brahman Breeders Association
- Use: meat

Traits
- Weight: Male: 887 kg (2000 lb); Female: 450–675 kg (1000–1500 lb)
- Height: Female: 128–145 cm
- Cattle; Hybrid Bos (primigenius) taurus/indicus

The Brahman or American Brahman is an American breed of zebuine-taurine hybrid beef cattle. It was bred in the United States from 1885 using cattle originating in India, imported at various times from the United Kingdom, India, and Brazil. These were mainly Gir, Guzerá and Nelore stock, with some Indu-Brasil, Krishna Valley and Ongole. The Brahman has a high tolerance of heat, sunlight and humidity, and good resistance to parasites. It has been exported to many countries, particularly in the tropics; in Australia it is the most numerous breed of cattle. It has been used in the creation of numerous taurine-indicine hybrids, some of which – such as the Brangus and Brahmousin – are established as separate breeds.

== History ==
Zebuine (Asian humped) cattle were present in the United States from 1849, when a single bull of Indian origin was imported from the United Kingdom to South Carolina. In 1885 a pair of grey bulls was brought directly from India to Texas; one was large, weighing over 800 kg, the other weighed little more than half that. Cross-breeding of these with local taurine cows was the first step in the creation of the Brahman breed. Other small groups of Indian cattle were imported up to about 1906, mostly to Texas; some of them were imported to be displayed as circus animals, and were later sold to ranchers. In 1924 and 1925 a total of 210 bulls and 18 cows of mainly zebuine-taurine hybrid Guzerá stock, but also including some Gir and Nelore, were brought from Brazil to the United States through Mexico.

A breed association, the American Brahman Breeders Association, was formed in 1924, and a herd-book was started. The name 'Brahman' was chosen by J. W. Sartwelle, secretary of the association. In 1939 the herd-book was closed, thereafter recording only the offspring of registered parents. The registration in 1946 of eighteen imported Brazilian bulls, mainly Indu-Brasil and Gir, was permitted, as were some later additions of imported stock. The association registered all American indicine cattle in the same herd-book until 1991, when herd-books for Gir, Guzerat, Indu-Brasil, Nelore and Tabapua were separated from that for the American Red and Grey Brahman.

Exports of cattle of this breed to Australia began in 1933 and continued until 1954, amounting to 49 head in all; by 1973 their offspring numbered more than 225000. Some further imports, numbering about 700 head in total, took place after 1981. By 1987 there were over a million in Queensland alone, and by the end of the century there were more of them in Australia than of any other breed, particularly in the tropical north of the country.

The Brahman is reported from fifty-five countries, in all inhabited continents, with an estimated world population of over 1.8 million head. Populations of over 100000 are reported by Argentina, Colombia, the Dominican Republic, Ecuador, Mexico, Mozambique and South Africa. No population data for the United States has been reported since 2014, when there were just under 9500 head.

== Characteristics ==
The Brahman has good tolerance of heat and humidity, good resistance to insects, and good tolerance of poor feeding conditions. It has been found to do well in southern coastal areas of the United States. These characteristics may be transmitted to cross-breeds of Brahman with cattle of European origin, which can also benefit from heterosis ('hybrid vigor').

== Use ==
The Brahman is reared for the meat industry, particularly in areas where good resistance to hot or tropical conditions is needed. As with other zebuine cattle, the meat is of lower quality than that of specialised European beef cattle breeds. For this reason it is commonly cross-bred with cattle of those breeds, either by raising hybrid calves born to pure-bred parents, or by creating a composite or hybrid breed, of which there are many. Some of them, such as the Brahmousin (Brahman x Limousin), Brangus (Brahman x Angus) and Simbrah (Brahman x Simmental) have acquired breed status in their own right, but many others have not. These include the Brahorn (Brahman x Shorthorn), the Bravon (Brahman x Devon) and South Bravon (Brahman x South Devon), the Bra-Swiss (Brahman x Brown Swiss), the Sabre (Brahman x Sussex) and the Braford (Brahman x Hereford).

In Oman and Fujairah, Brahman bulls are used in the traditional sport of bull-butting; they may be fed milk and honey to prepare them for the contest.

== Gallery ==
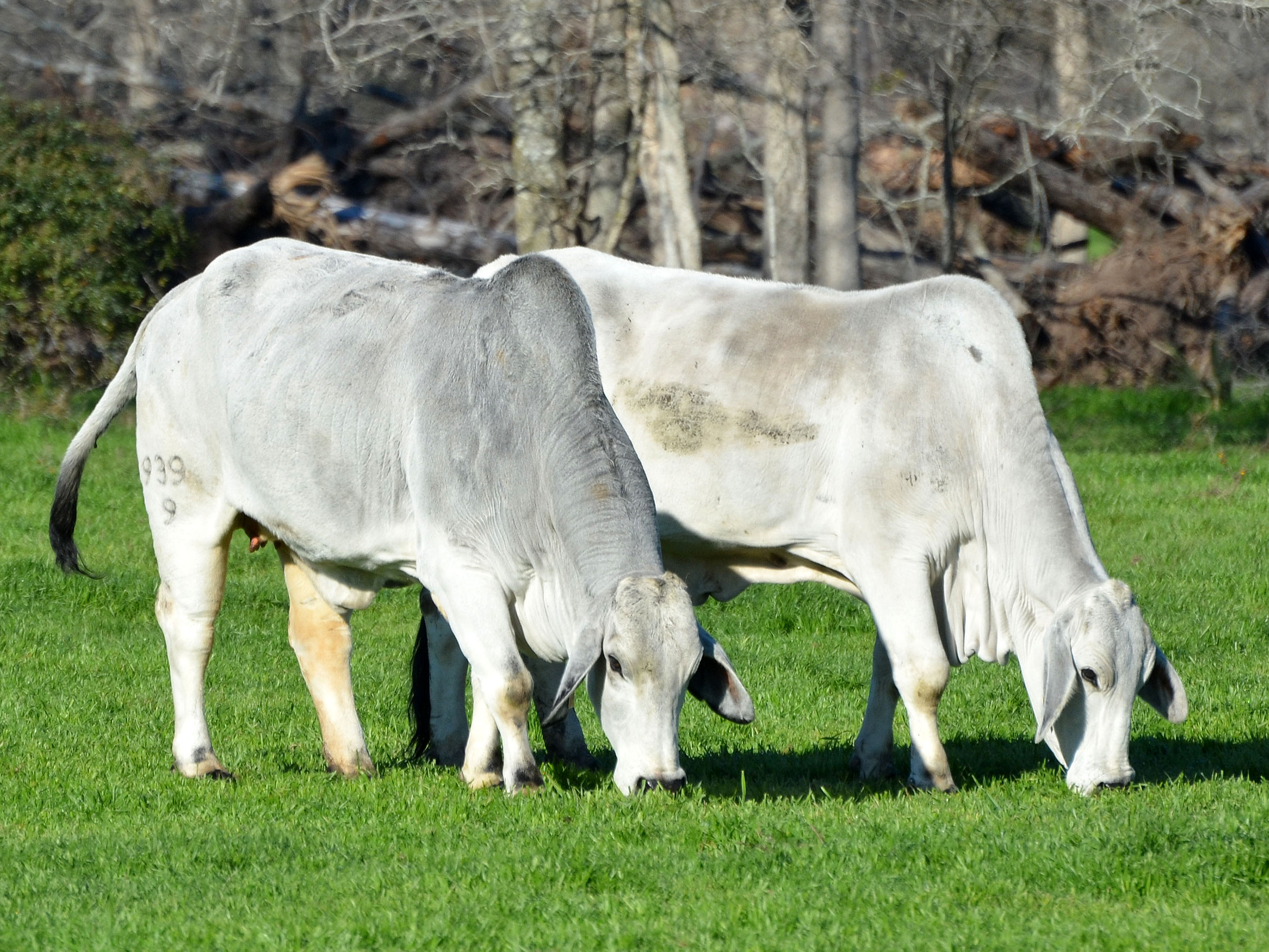
In Brazos County, Texas

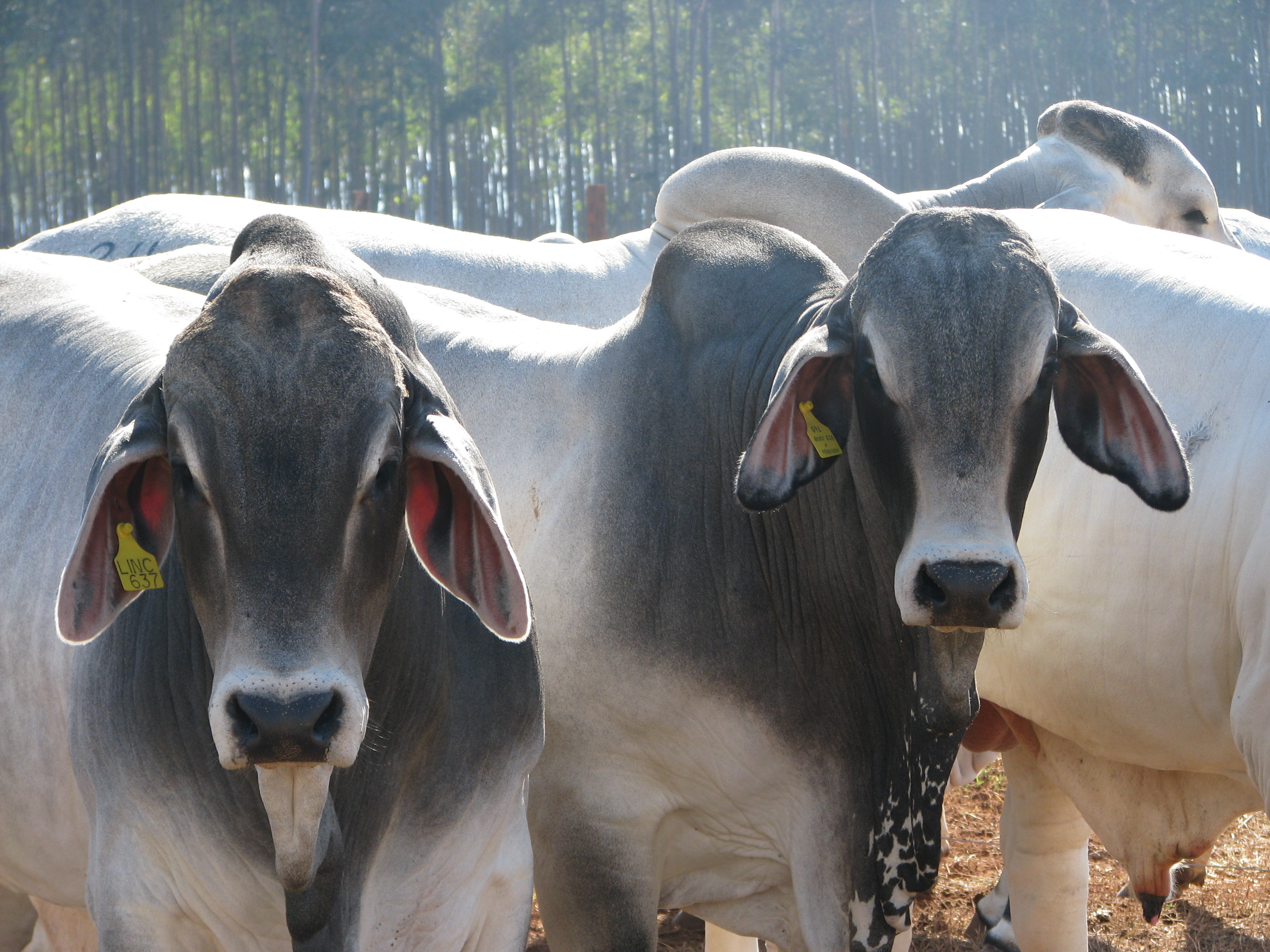
In Uberaba, Brazil

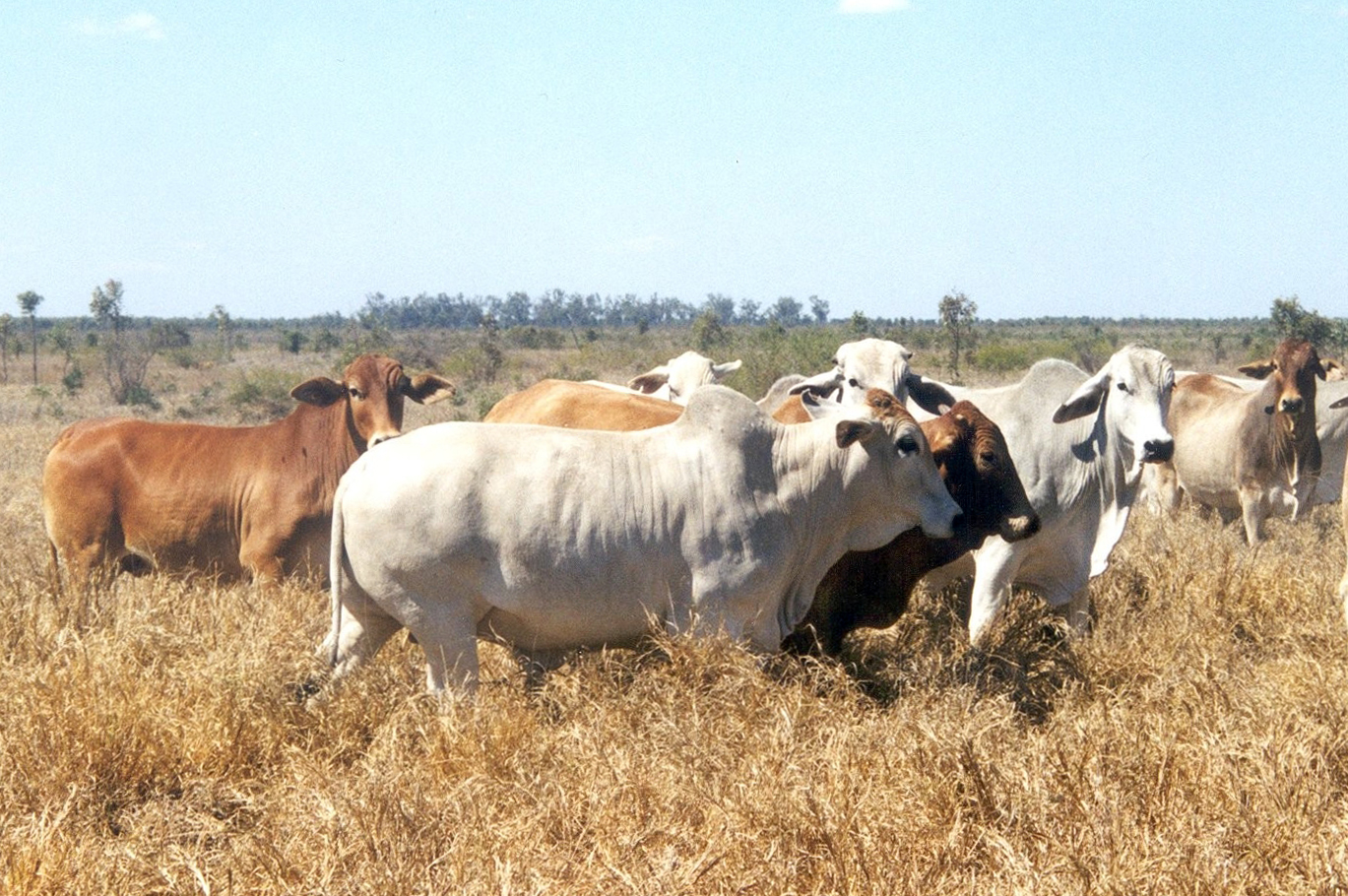
In northern Australia

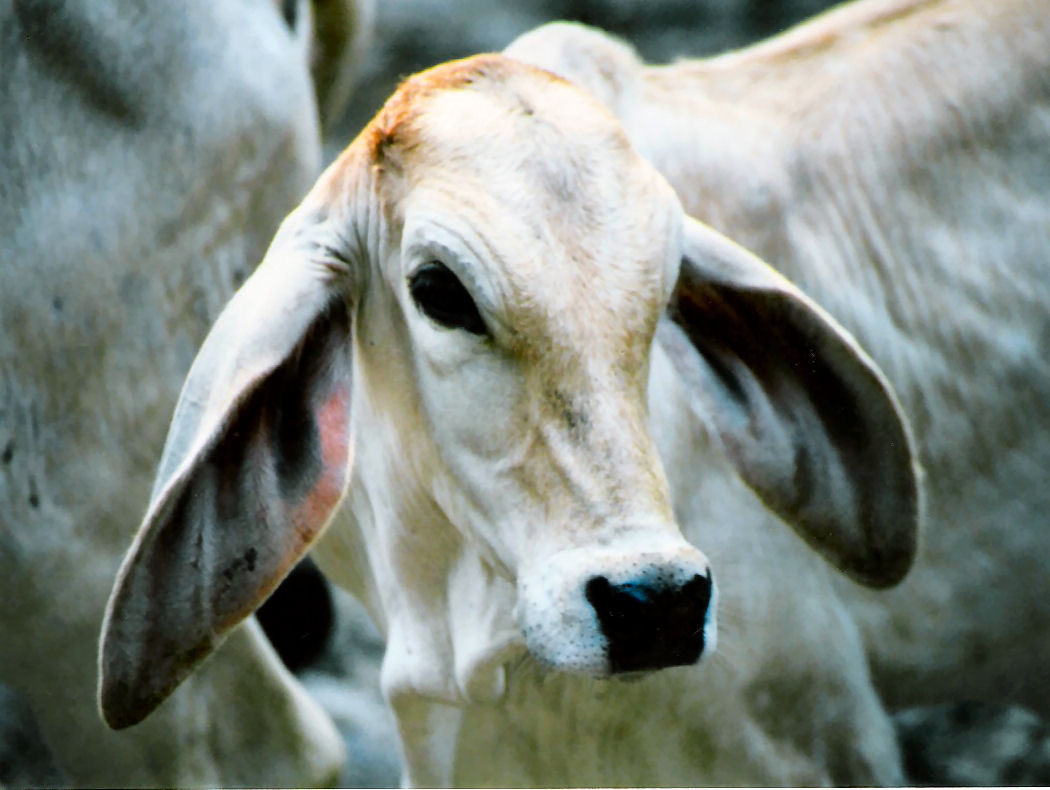
Calf in Costa Rica
