= Gyr cattle =

Indian breed of zebuine dairy cattle

Gir
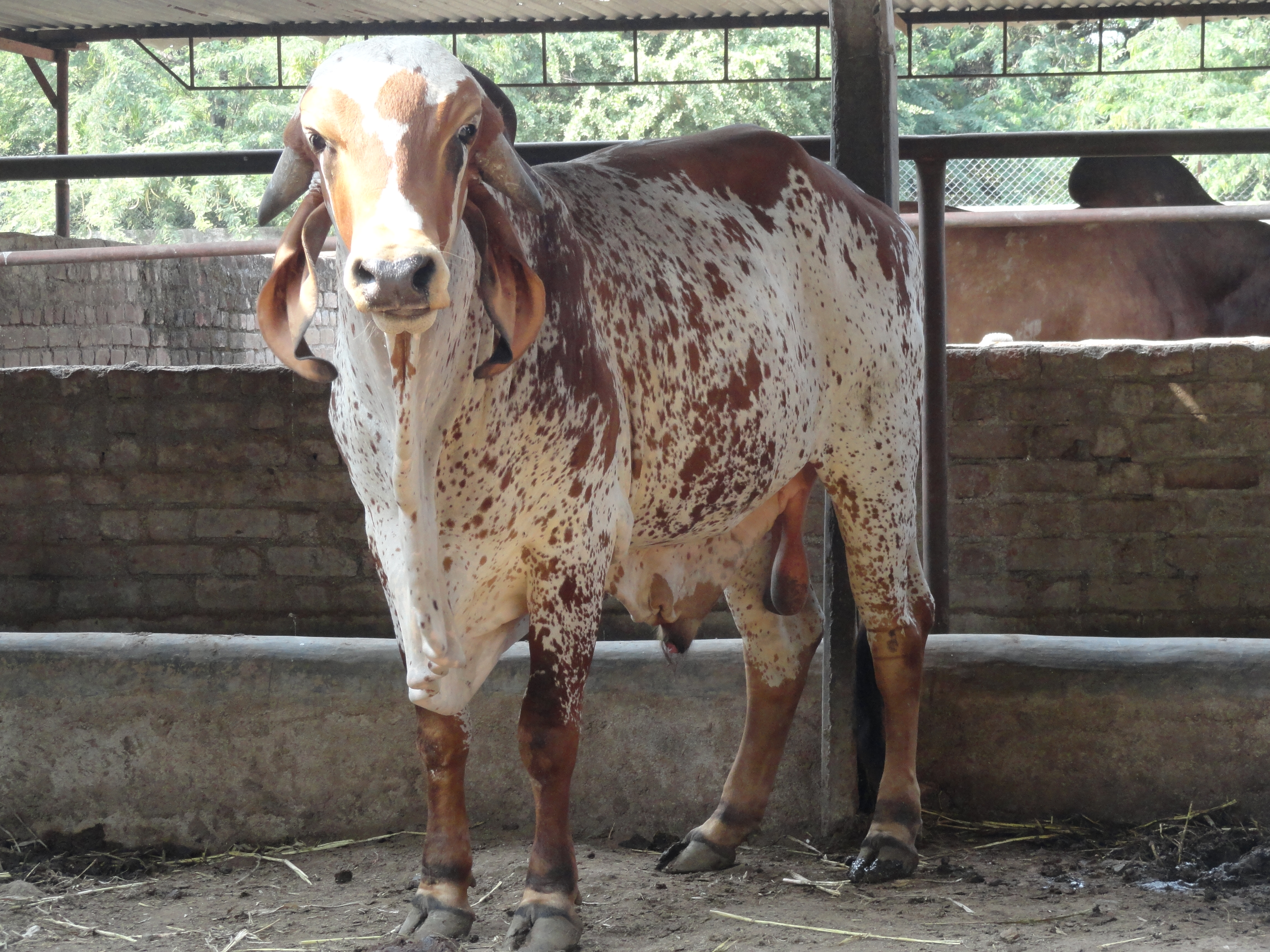
- Bull at Bhavnagar
- Conservation status: FAO (2007): not at risk
- Other names: Bhodali; Desan; Gujarati; Kathiawari; Sorthi; Surti
- Country of origin: India
- Distribution: Gujarat, India; Brazil
- Use: dairy
- Cattle; Bos (primigenius) indicus

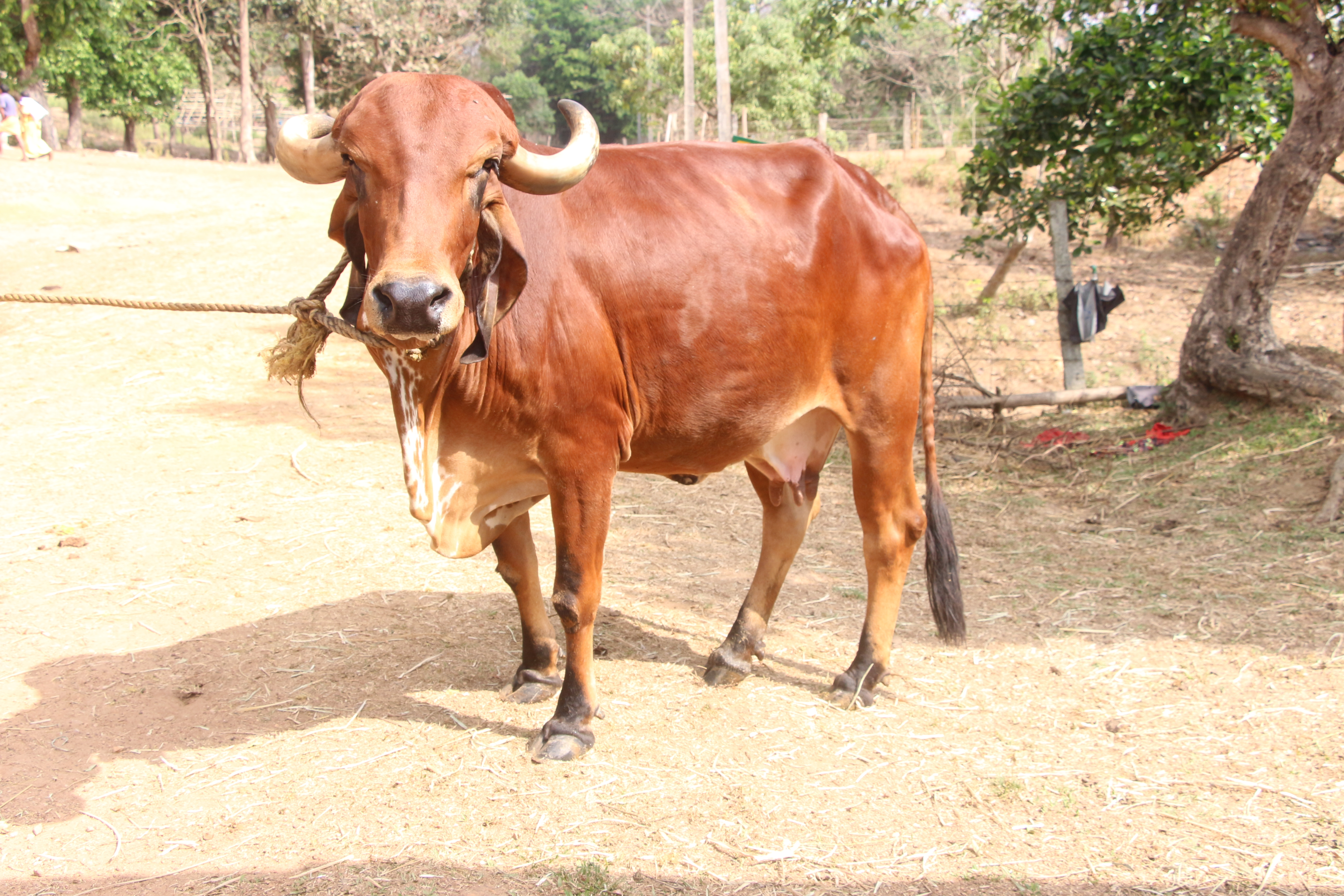
Cow

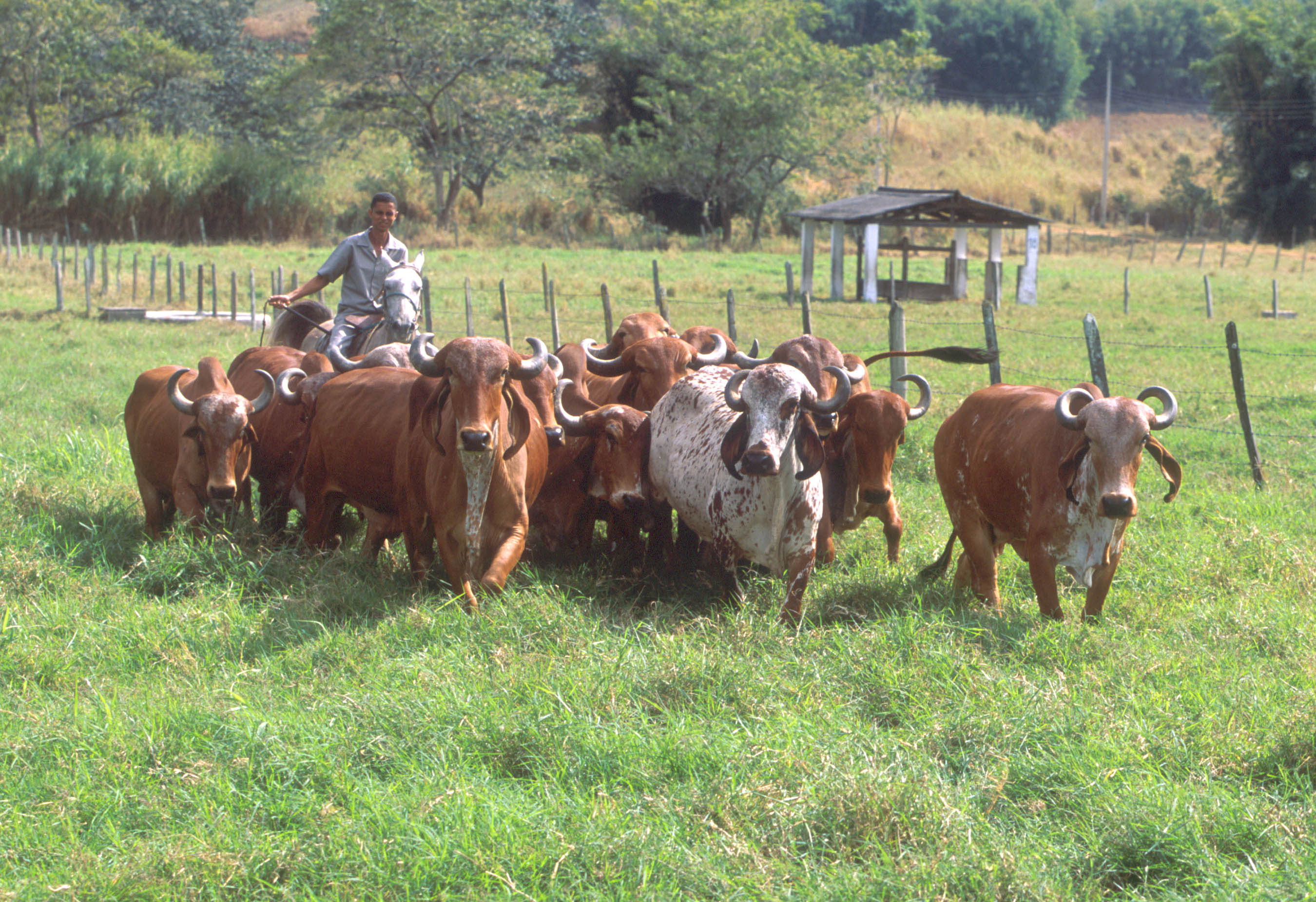
Gyr cattle in Brazil

The Gir is an Indian breed of zebuine cattle. It originated in the Kathiawar peninsula in the state of Gujarat, and the name of the breed derives from that of the Gir Hills in that region. Other names include Bhodah, Desan, Gujarati, Kathiawari, Sorthi and Surti.

These cattle were exported to Brazil from the early twentieth century, and the Brazilian Gir numbers about five million head; selective breeding since the 1960s has led to the development of separate dairy (Gir Leiteiro) and beef strains.

== History ==
The Gir originated in the Kathiawar peninsula in the state of Gujarat the name of the breed derives from that of the Gir Hills in that region. Its traditional breeding range extended into the Amreli, Bhavnagar, Junagadh and Rajkot districts of the state. It was known by a number of different names, among them 'Bhodah', 'Desan', 'Gujarati', 'Kathiawari', 'Sorthi' and 'Surti'.

It has been used locally in the improvement of other breeds including the Red Sindhi and the Sahiwal. It was also one of the breeds used in the development of the Brahman breed in North America. In Brazil and other South American countries the Gir is used frequently because, as a Bos indicus breed, it is resistant to hot temperatures and tropical diseases. It is well known for its milk producing qualities and is often bred with Friesian cows to make the Girolando breed.

== Characteristics ==
The Gir is distinctive in appearance, typically having a rounded and domed forehead (being the only ultraconvex breed in the world), long pendulous ears and horns which spiral out and back. Gir are generally mottled with the colour ranging from red through yellow to white, black being the only unacceptable colour. They originated in west India in the state of Gujarat and have since spread to neighbouring Maharashtra and Rajasthan.

Cows average 385 kg in weight and 130 cm in height; bulls weigh 545 kg on average, with a height of 140 cm. At birth, calves weigh about 20 kg.

In India in 2000 the Gir numbered about 917000, or 37% of the 2.5 million cattle population of the Saurashtra region of Gujarat. In 2010 the population in Brazil was estimated at approximately five million.

== Use ==
The average milk yield for the Gir in India is 2110 kg per lactation, with approximately 4.5% fat.
