= Nelore =

Brazilian breed of cattle

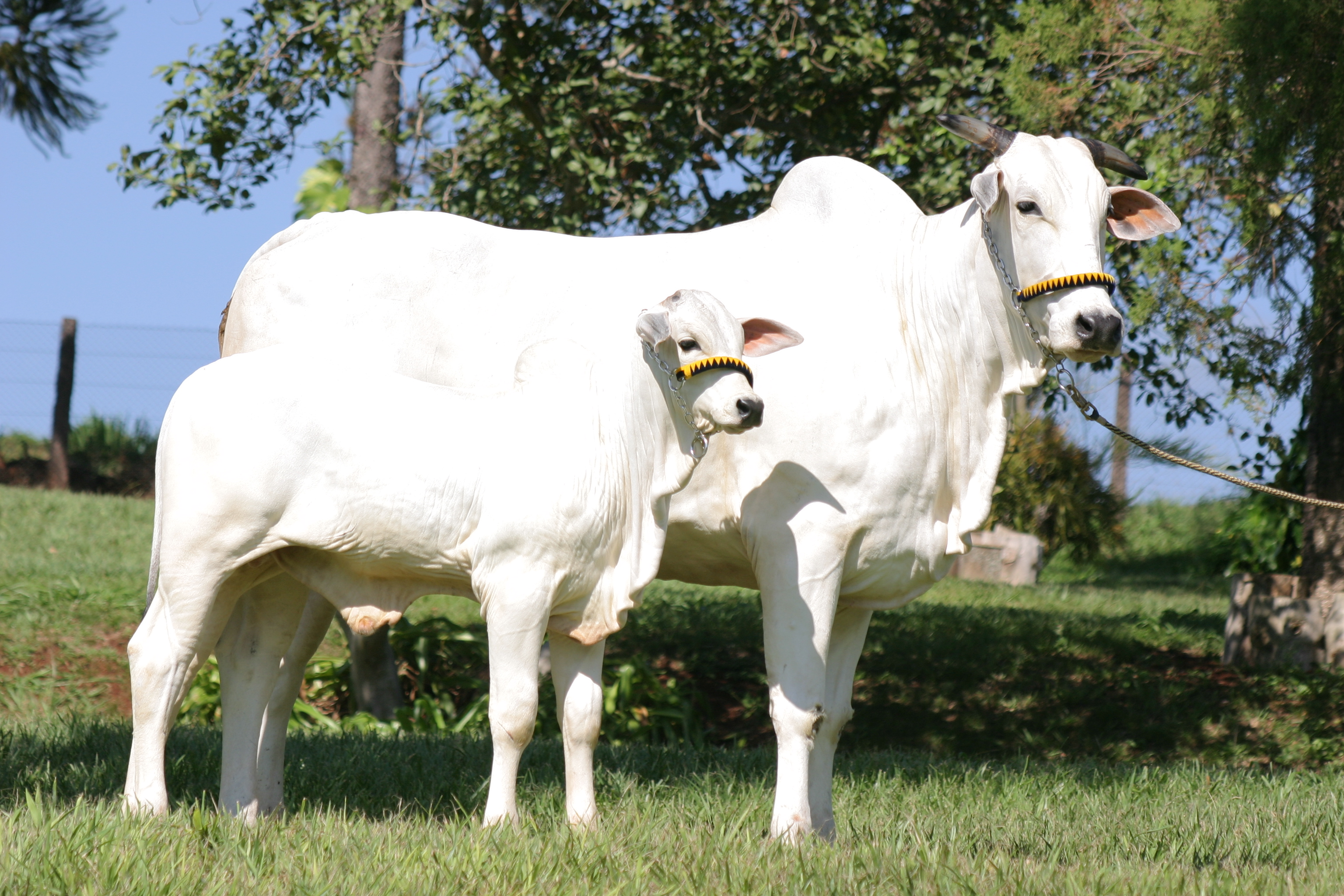
- Cow with bull calf

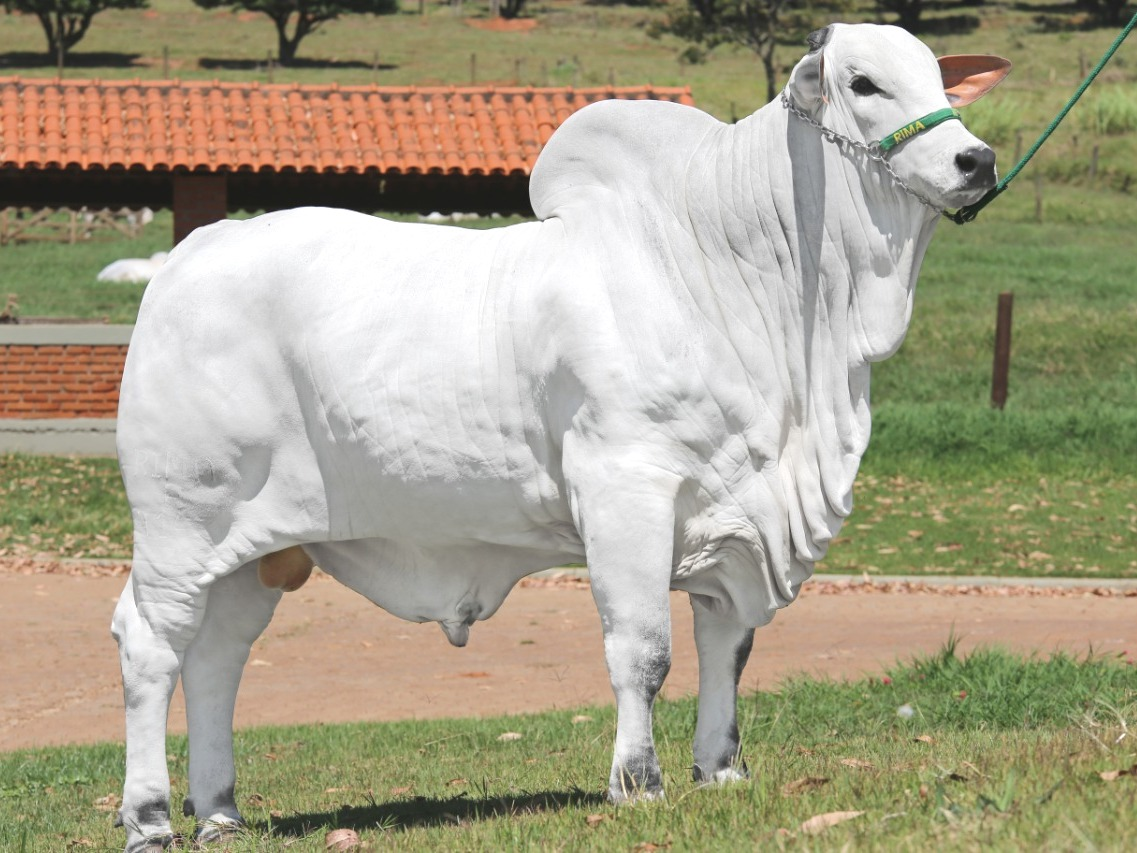
- Bull
- Conservation status: FAO (2007): not at risk; DAD-IS (2026): not at risk
- Other names: Nellore
- Country of origin: Brazil
- Distribution: Angola; Argentina; Belize; Bolivia; Congo (Democratic Republic of the); Costa Rica; Ecuador; El Salvador; Guinea-Bissau; Guatemala; Haiti; Honduras; Mexico; Malaysia; Nicaragua; Panama; Peru; Philippines; Paraguay; Suriname; Uruguay; Venezuela

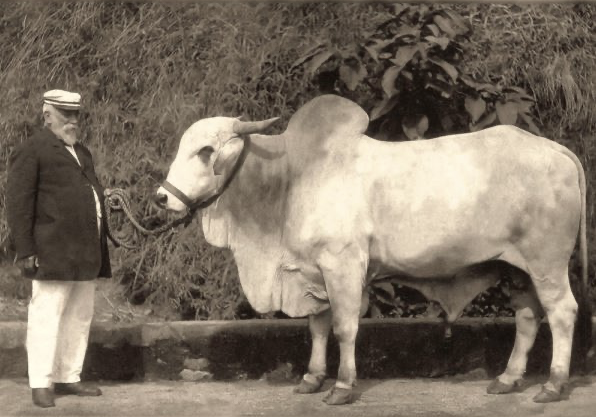
Manoel Ubelhart Lemgruber with his bull Piron, late nineteenth/early twentieth century

The Nelore is a Brazilian breed of beef cattle. It is of zebuine (Bos indicus) type, and derives from the Ongole breed of the modern Andhra Pradesh state of southern India. The name derives from that of the district of Nellore in the former Madras Presidency, of which Ongole taluk was formerly a part.

The Nelore is among the most numerous breeds of cattle world-wide. A naturally polled strain, the Nelore Mocho, is treated as a separate breed by Guatemala and Paraguay, but not by Brazil. A coloured variant, the Nelore Pintado, is red, either with or without patches of black or white.

== History ==
Zebuine cattle were first brought to Brazil in 1813, when two animals from the Malabar Coast of India were landed at the port of Salvador, in Bahia. According to some accounts, a breeding pair of Ongole type was landed from an English ship at the same port in 1868; this conflicts with the history given by the Associação Brasileira dos Criadores de Zebu, the national association of zebu breeders, for whom the landing in Bahia in 1868 was of a Sindhi bull, while the English ship – with mutinous crew – went in 1873 to Recife, where it landed a bull, probably from Mysore.

In 1878 the Swiss landowner Manoel Ubelhart Lemgruber, owner of the Fazenda Santo Antônio in Sapucaia, in Rio de Janeiro state, travelled to Germany. At the Tierpark Hagenbeck in Stellingen, near Hamburg, he saw cattle of Ongole/Nelore type and arranged for some to be shipped to him in Brazil; a bull and two cows reached him in October 1878. He arranged for further shipments in 1880 and in 1883, and his herd began to grow; he found the cattle to be well adapted to the climatic conditions of his estate.

In 1895 some stock was imported from India by the state of Rio de Janeiro, and in 1906 a shipment of 800 head – most of them bulls – reached Uberaba in the state of Minas Gerais. Imports of stock from India were halted by government order in 1921, and again in 1931. A herd-book was started in either 1936 or 1938, and a breed association established in 1939.

The last imports from India were made between 1960 and 1962, reaching Brazil after a period of quarantine on the island of Fernando de Noronha. Among these animals was the influential bull Karvardi, and others including Akasamu, Checurupadu, Godhavari, Golias, Padu and Rastã, from which distinct breeding lines derive.

In the 1960s the Brazilian government promoted beef production in the country, distributing large numbers of zebu – mostly Nelore – and also distributing large quantities of seed of African grasses of the Brachiaria (now Urochloa) genus, which could be used to convert the cerrado biome to pasture suitable for livestock. By the turn of the century more than 80 Mha had been sown with African grasses, principally of Urochloa species.

From about 1925 to 1945 the Indu-Brasil had been the dominant beef breed of Brazil; it remained important in beef production until the 1970s. In the latter part of the twentieth century the Nelore became the most numerous beef breed in the country, with a population of 2.5 million by 1991.

In the 2020s the total number of cattle – both beef and dairy – in Brazil was estimated to be over 200 million head. About 80% of all beef cattle in the country either Nelore or Nelore cross-breeds, and the total number of these may exceed 100 million. The number of registered breeding stock is much lower: in 2024 it was 7522808, with 5025058 cows and 2497750 active bulls. The Nelore is reported by more than twenty other countries, principally in Central and South America, but also in Africa and the Far East.

== Characteristics ==
The Nelore has a distinct large hump over the top of the shoulder and neck. They have long legs which help them to walk in water and when grazing. The Nelore can adapt to all climates except very cold temperatures. They are very resistant to high temperatures and have natural resistance to various parasites and diseases. Nelore have the shortest ears of most Bos indicus types. A naturally polled strain, the Nelore Mocho, is treated as a separate breed by Guatemala and Paraguay, but not by Brazil.

== See also ==
- Viatina-19 FIV Mara Imóveis
