= Guzerá =

Brazilian breed of cattle

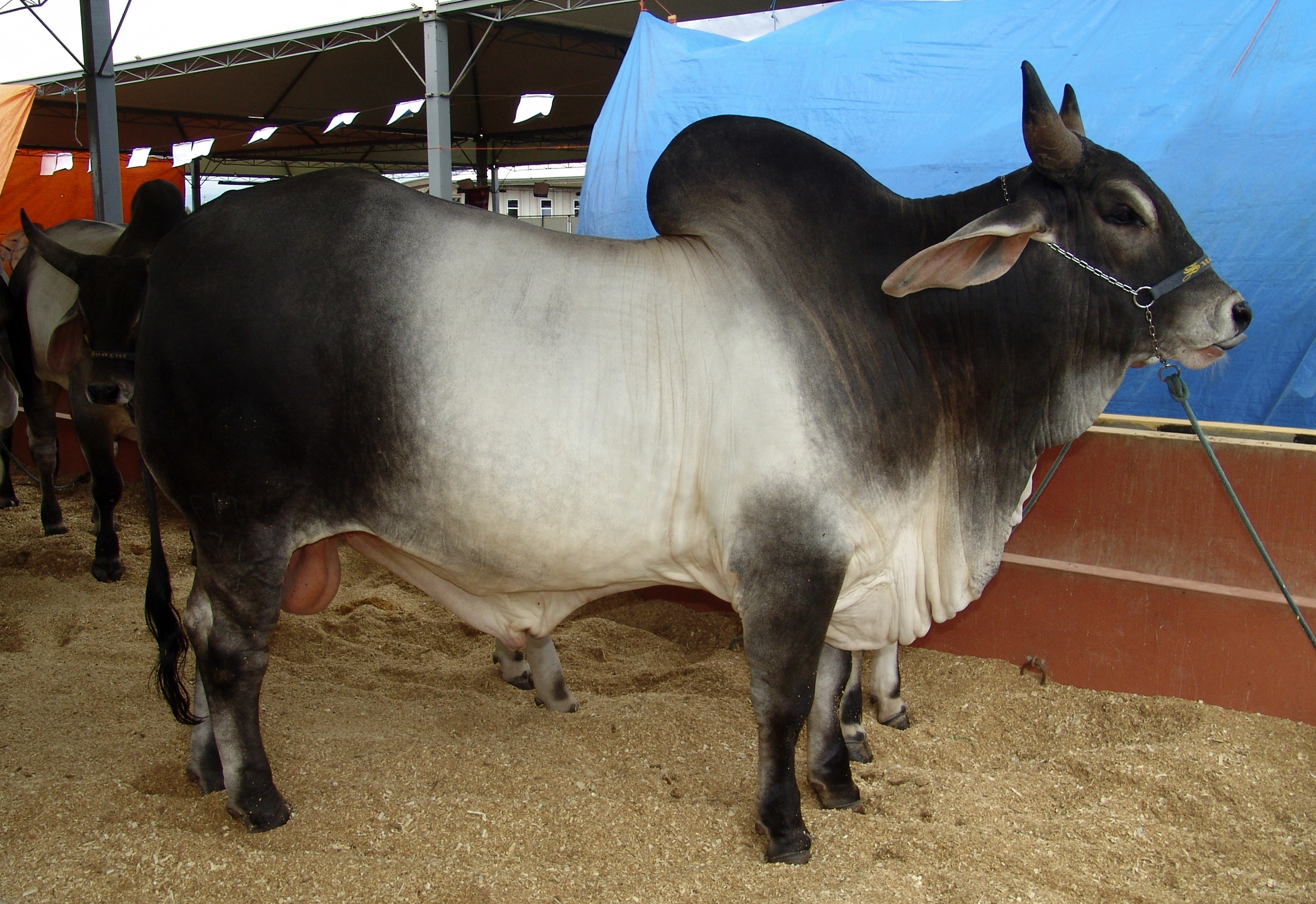
- Bull in Avaré

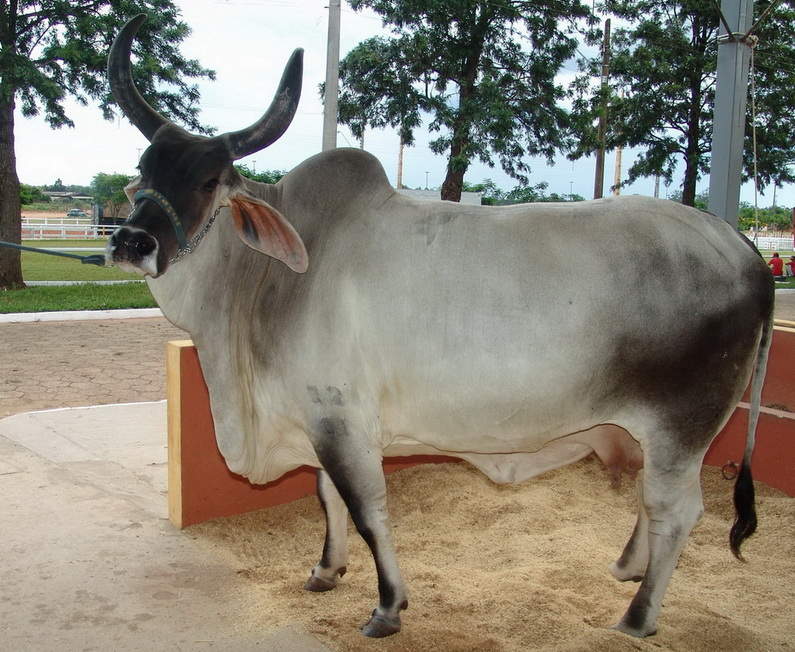
- Cow in Avaré
- Conservation status: FAO (2007): not at risk; DAD-IS (2025): not at risk
- Other names: Azulego; Kankrej; Guzerat
- Country of origin: Brazil
- Distribution: Northeast Region; State of Goiás; State of Minas Gerais; State of Rio de Janeiro; State of São Paulo
- Use: meat; dual-purpose line

Traits
- Weight: Male: 900 kg; Female: 600 kg
- Height: Male: 165 cm; Female: 154 cm
- Skin colour: black
- Coat: usually grey or white
- Horn status: horned in both sexes; polled variant
- Cattle; Hybrid Bos (primigenius) taurus/indicus

The Guzerá or Guzerat is a Brazilian breed of taurindicine cattle. It derives from cross-breeding of Indian Kankrej cattle, imported to Brazil from 1870 onwards, with local taurine Crioulo cattle of European origin. The name is a Portuguese spelling of that of the western Indian state of Gujarat.

== History ==
From about 1870 Kankrej bulls from the Indian state of Gujarat were imported to the Cerrado region of the Brazilian state of Minas Gerais, where they were cross-bred with local cows of Crioulo type, giving rise to the Guzerá; the name is a Portuguese spelling of 'Gujarat'. Some Kankrej cows were also imported, and zebuine mitochondrial DNA is carried by roughly 70% of modern Guzerá cattle. The cattle spread to Uberaba and to northern São Paulo State, and later to the states of Goiás and Rio de Janeiro and to states in the Nordeste region.

The herd-book for the breed was started in 1938; in it, three separate lines are distinguished: the beef type, a dual-purpose meat and dairy line (Guzerá Leiteiro) and a polled variant (Guzerá Mocho). In 2010 there were approximately 92000 head registered, constituting some 3.5% of the total number of indicine cattle in Brazil; there were about 17500 new registrations in that year. The total number reported for the breed for 2022 was just under 40000.

The Guzerá was one of the principal breeds from which the American Brahman was developed in the twentieth century, and has contributed to the development of several other Brazilian breeds. Among these are the Guzolando, from cross-breeding with Holandesa (Friesian) stock; the Indu-Brasil, from crosses with Brazilian Gir and Nellore; the Lavinia, from crossing with the Schwyz; the Normanzu, from crosses with the Normande; and the Pitangueiras, from cross-breeding with the Red Poll.
