= Mizri =

Village in Pakistan

Coordinates: 29°30′N 67°55′E

Mizri is a village near Sibi Balochistan Pakistan.

== See also ==
- Sibi District
- Mehergarh
- Sibi
- Bibi Nani
- khajjak
- Marghazani
- Kurak
- Talli
