= Shahrigh =

Coordinates: 30°11′23″N 67°42′34″E

- Town and union council
- Interactive map of Shahrigh
- Country: Pakistan
- Province: Balochistan
- District: Harnai
- Time zone: UTC+5 (PST)

Shahrigh is a town and union council of Harnai District in the Balochistan province of Pakistan. It is located at 30°11'23N 67°42'34E at an altitude of 1217 m (3996 ft).

== See also ==
- Mehergarh
- Bibi Nani
- khajjak
- Dehpal
- Marghazani
- Kurak
- Sibi Mela
