= Safi pirak =

Village in Pakistan

== Safi Pirak ==
Safi Pirak is a village in Sibi district, Balochistan, Pakistan.

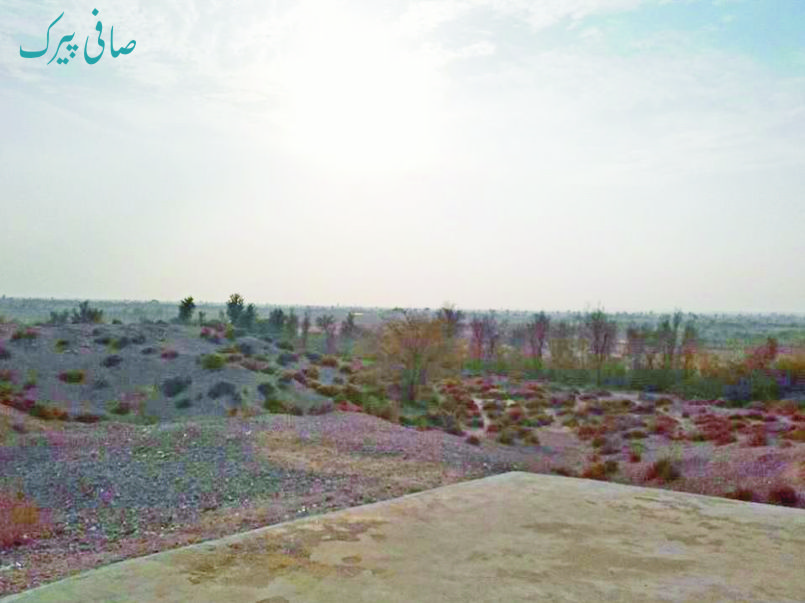
Safi Pirak

== See also ==
- Mehergarh
- Bibi Nani
- khajjak
- Dehpal
- Marghazani
- Kurak
