= Sevi Tehsil =

Pakistani administrative area

Subu
- Tehsil
- Country: Pakistan
- Province: Balochistan (Pakistan)
- District: Sibi District
- Time zone: UTC+5 (PST)
- Number of towns: 1
- Number of Union Councils: 9

Sibi Tehsil (Urdu: تحصیل سبی) is a subdivision (tehsil) of Sibi District in the Balochistan province of Pakistan. Sibi Tehsil contains the following settlements: Sangan, Sibi, Talli, Kurak, Khajjak and Mal. The population according to the 2017 census was 60,339 of which 32,359 were male and 27,977.

== History ==
During British rule the tehsil of Sibi was created, the population in 1891 was 7,125 which increased to 20,526 in 1901. At time the tehsil contained one town, Sibi, and 32 villages.
