= Talli =

Village in Pakistan

Talli is a village at a distance of 22 kilometers from Sibi city of Balochistan, Pakistan.

== See also ==
- Sibi District
- Mehergarh
- Sevi
- Bibi Nani
- khajjak
- Marghazani
- Kurak
