= Dehpal =

Village in Pakistan

Coordinates: 29°34′N 67°51′E

Dehpal is a village in the Sibi District of Balochistan, Pakistan. It is situated 1 km west of the city of Sibi, near the airport.

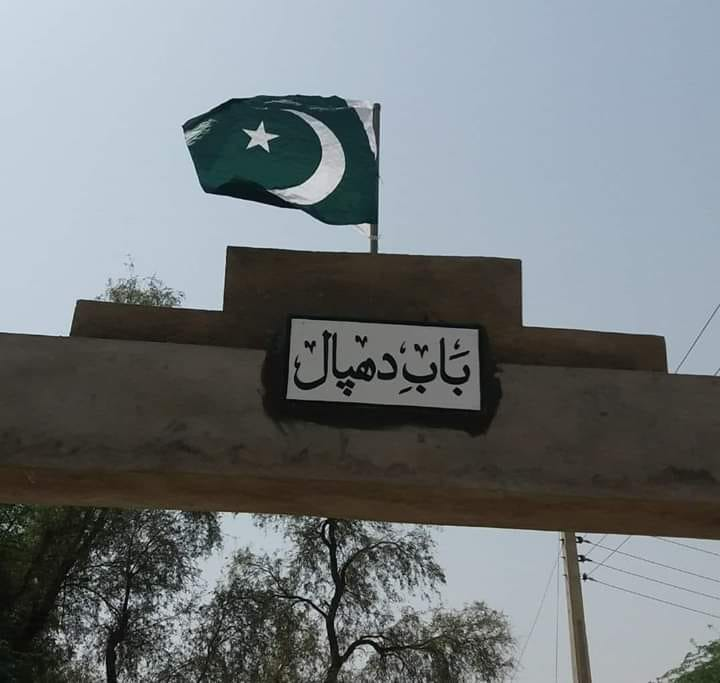
Dehpal Gate Sibi

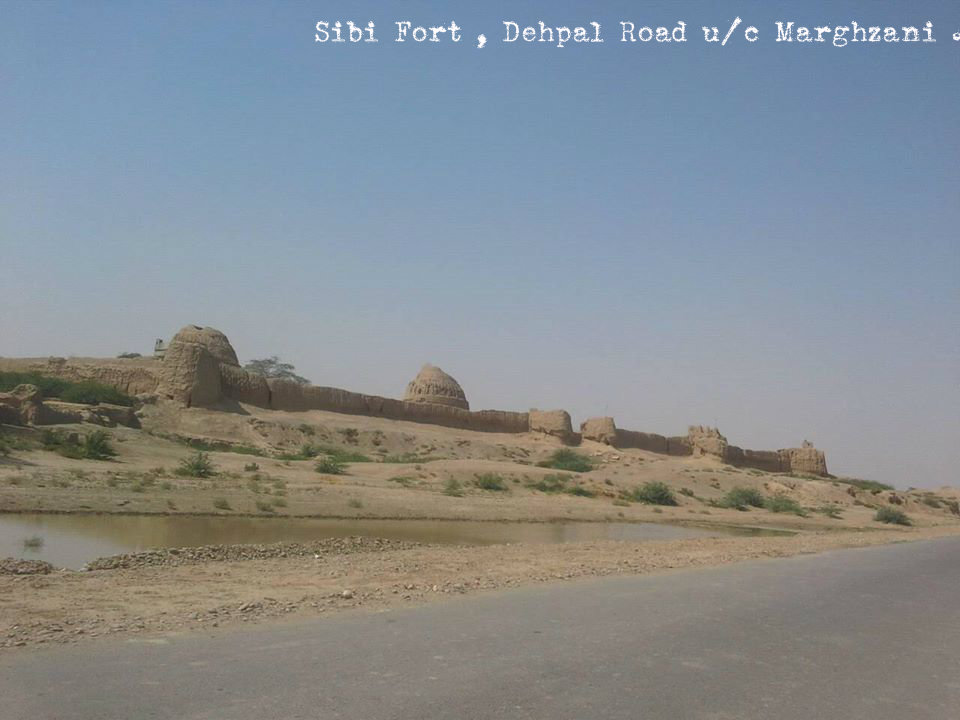
Sibi Fort Dehpal Kalan

The Dehpal Panni Tribe lived in the Ancient Sibi Fort for many years.

== Sibi Fort (Siwi Fort) ==
The ancient Fort of Sibi is situated in Dehpal Kalan village near Sibi city. It finds place in popular Chach Nama where it is narrated that the King Chach defeated Sewas pushing out of this place and captured Sibi Fort.The Hindu rulers Sewas kept control for considerable time ultimately lost to king Chach in 550 A.D. The Arab General Muhammad bin Qasim say whole of this area. During the 11th century Sibi included in Ghaznavid Empire. Sibi Fort was fief of Jam Nizamuddin II of Sindh in 1488 A.D. the end of 15th century Sibi Fort was captured by Shah beg Arghun rebuilt the huge dome shaped architecture which still exists. In 1575 A.D. decaying of Arghun dynasty the Panni tribe taken control of Siwi Fort. The Government records evidence shows that Dehpal a Panni (Pashtun tribe) lived in Sibi Fort and possess the land adjacent to the Fort, a village Dehpal Kalan is situated near the Fort.

== See also ==
- Sibi District
- Mehergarh
- Sevi
- Bibi Nani
- khajjak
- Marghazani
- Kurak
- Talli
