= Pirak =

Archaeological site in Pakistan

Coordinates: 29.4437°N 67.844°E

- پیراک (Punjabi)
- Type: Archaeological site
- Location: Near Perak railway station, Balochistan, Pakistan
- Region: Indus Valley civilization

History
- Built: c. 1800 BCE
- Abandoned: c. 800 BCE

Site notes
- Material: Unburnt brick, pottery, iron artifacts
- Height: 8 m (26 ft)
- Area: 12 acres (4.9 ha)
- Excavation dates: 1968–1974

Pirak (Urdu: پیراک) is an archaeological site belonging to the Indus Valley civilization located in Balochistan, Pakistan. It is 20 km south of Sibi east of the Nari River. The mound is 8m high and covers approximately 12 acres (4.9 ha). The site of Pirak was first reported by Robert Raikes in 1963. It was excavated, between 1968 and 1974, before the well known sites of Mehrgarh or Nausharo by the French archaeological mission team led by Jean Marie Casal. According to the excavator, this site was occupied from c.1800 BCE to 800 BCE.

== Historical significance ==
Very early horse remains have been found in the site. Also, the site has some very early ironwork and iron artefacts. The ironwork seems to have had a gradual introduction.

== Architecture and material culture ==
The excavator records three phases of unbroken occupation in Safi pirak.

- In the first period, structures of unburnt brick associated with a large platform were found. A major part of the pottery was a coarse ware decorated with applique bands and fingertip impressions. Both terracotta and unburnt clay figurines of horses and camels were found, along with numerous bones of both the species. The earliest indubitable evidence of domestic horse comes from Safi Pirak, during period I (c.1700 BC), well after Mature Harappan period. Terracota button seals of circular, square or curved forms were common.
- The second period also showed a similar assemblage with large numbers of terracota and clay figurines, which include not only Bactrian camels and horses but also human figures, including riders. Along with numerous tools of copper and bronze, first pieces of iron are also found.
- The third period (c.1000–800 BCE) produced a greater quantity of iron and a continuation of all the elements of the earlier periods. Along with three varieties and two varieties of barley, rice and sorghum were also found here, which is the first recorded appearance of these two cereals in this region.

== Artefacts found ==
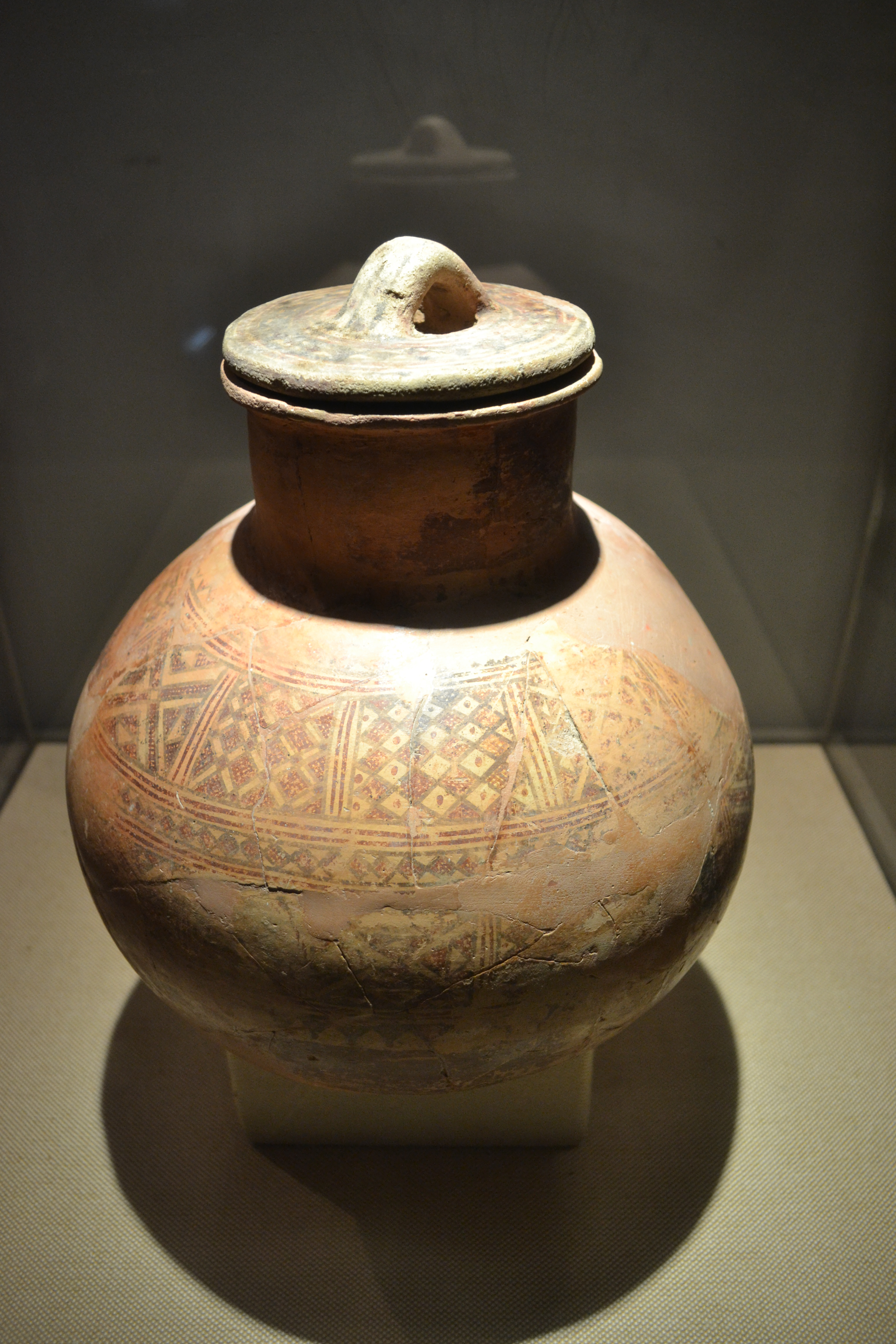
Water pitcher found at Pirak

In addition to pottery items, wheeled camel figures (terracotta) as per Harappan tradition were also found at Pirak. Items made of Iron were also present in this site. Different seals were also found.

== Cultivation ==
Rice was cultivated as main crop in Post urban Pirak and the Kachi Plain was irrigated. A canal was constructed alongside the settlement of Pirak shows continuation of irrigation facility in the region. Grapes, oats and chickpeas were also grown at Pirak.

== See also ==
- Indus Valley civilization
- Mehrgarh
- Nausharo
