= Sibi Fort =

Fortification in Balochistan, Pakistan

Coordinates: 29°33′30″N 67°52′08″E

Sibi Fort سبی قلعہ
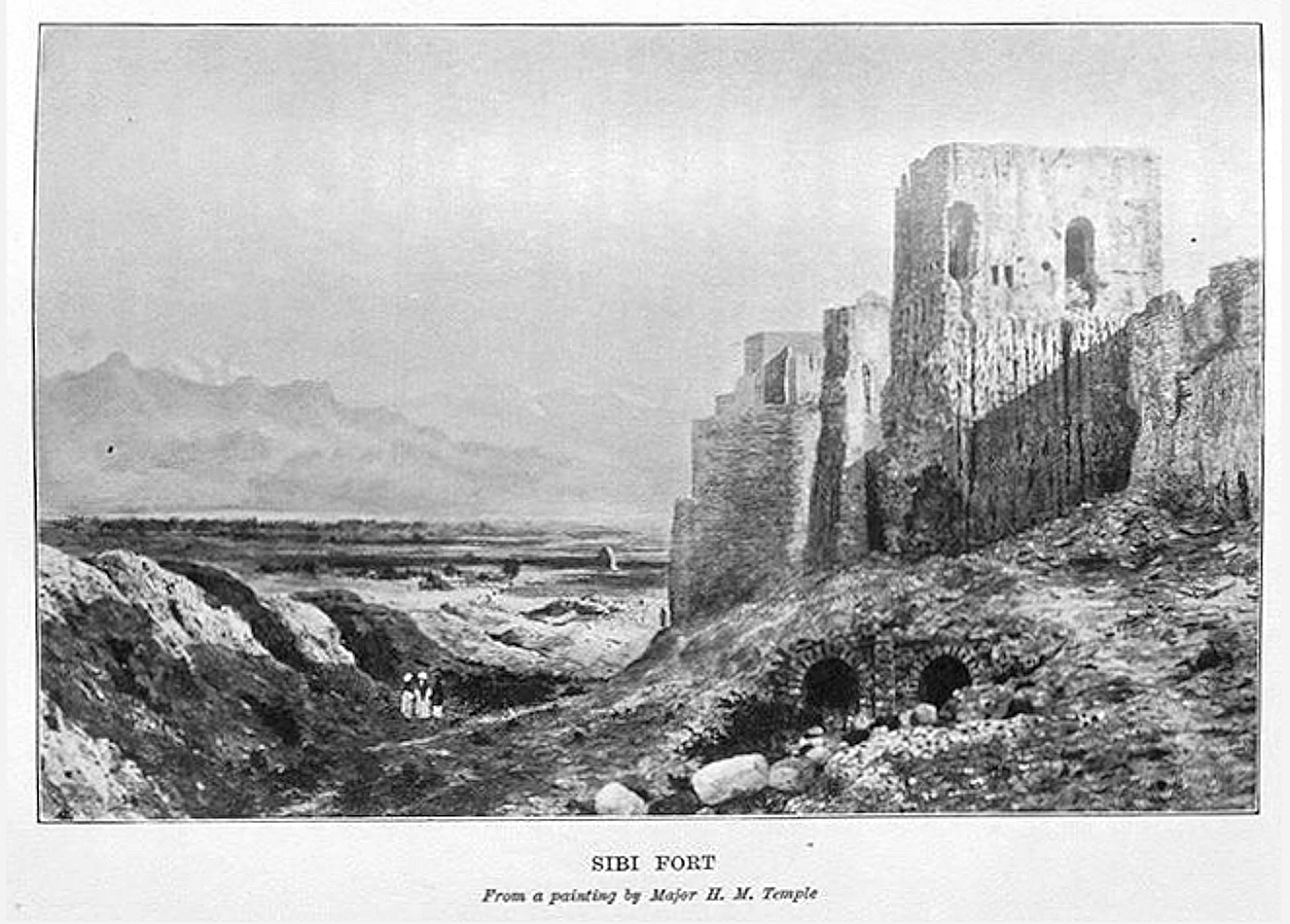
- Sibi Fort, drawn by Major H.M. Temple in the early 19th century
- Interactive map of Sibi Fort سبی قلعہ
- Location: Sibi District, Balochistan, Pakistan

History
- Built: c. 650

Sibi Fort, also known as Chakar Fort, is a ruined fort situated in Sibi city of Balochistan Province, Pakistan. Throughout its history, the ancient mud fort faced burning and destruction several times due to the tribal wars of the region.

== History ==
Dating back to around 650 AD, the fort was constructed by a local Hindu tribe Sewis. Sibi (Siwi) was a popular place of the Chachnama that the King Chach defeated Sewis, pushing them out of this place captured Sibi Fort. The Hindu rulers Sewis had kept this for some time but lost to king Chach in 550 A.D. The Brahman rule continued here until the early part of eighth century A.D. When the young Arab general Muhammad bin Qasim conquered the whole of these areas, In the 11th century, Sibi was included in Ghaznavid Empire. The Muslims rule remained it included in the Suba Multan under Nasir ad-Din Qabacha (1210-1228 A.D.)

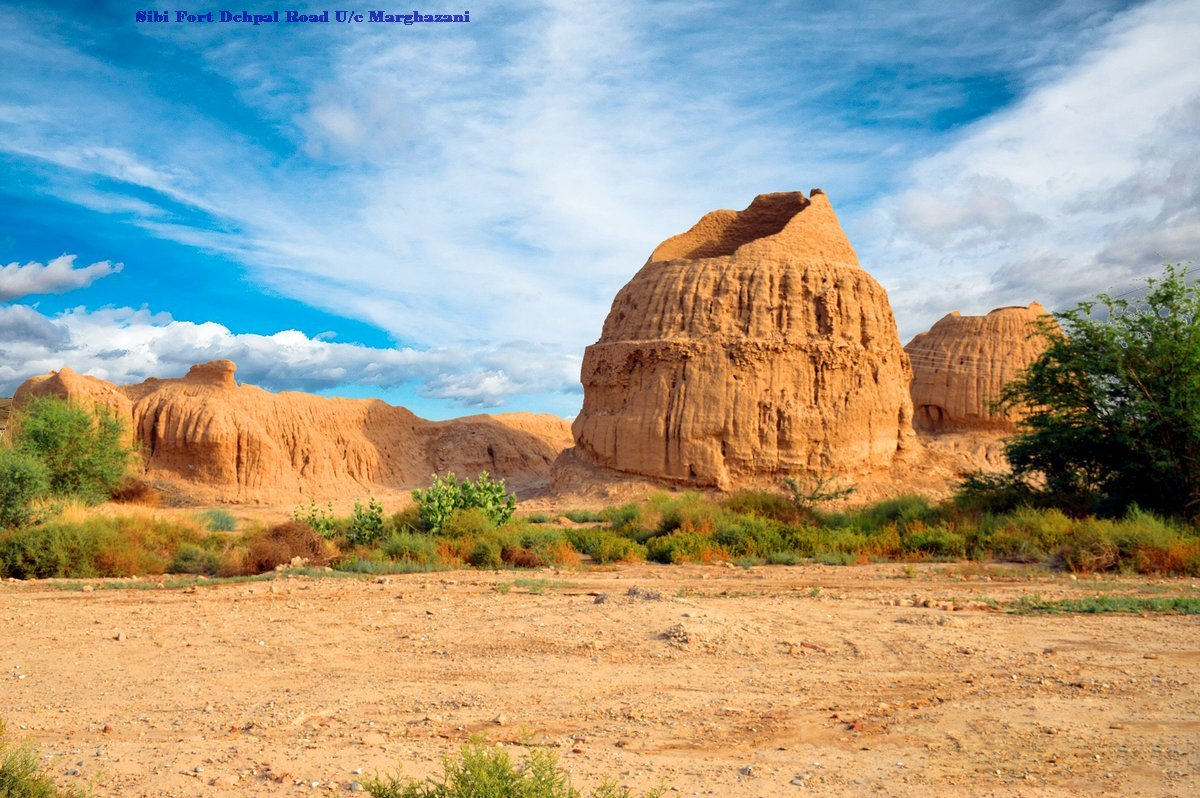
Ruins of Sibi Fort today

According to the Persian book Ain-i-Akbari, the Sibi Fort was in control by Jam Nizamuddin of Sindh as a province in 1488 A.D. At the end of 15th century, Sibi Fort was ruled by Sultan Pur-Dil Barlas whose forces were thrown out of the fort by the forces of Shah Beg Arghun of Arghun dynasty. In the early 16th-century, the fort was constructed twice by the Arghons Government. In 1543 A.D. Sibi Fort was visited by the Mughal king Humayun along with his infant son Akbar, the future Great Mughal and the emperor of India. The father and the son found the Arghuns in possession of the fort. Mulla Mehumd Jiskani the author of Tazkir-ul-Bar assigns 15th century A.D. for the occupation of Sibi by the Pannis. According to the Akbarnama of Abul Fazal and Faizi Sarhindi by 1575 AD, Panni (Pashtun tribe) were already in control of Sibi Fort. They must have been present in the general area of Sibi much before. The Government records of Sibi District shows that Dehpal a Panni tribe lived in Sibi Fort they still possess the land adjacent to the fort, the villages Dehpal Kalan and Dehpal Khurd of Dehpal tribe is situated near the fort. They lived and built the rooms inside the Sibi Fort ruins.
