= Catherine Jarrige (archaeologist) =

French archaeologist

Catherine Jarrige, nee Catherine Klein (born 27 January 1942), is a retired French archaeologist, best known for co-leading the discovery of Mehrgarh, a Neolithic site in Balochistan, Pakistan.

== Career ==
Jarrige began working in Balochistan in 1964. She lived with her husband, Jean-François Jarrige, in Lucknow, India from 1967 until 1969.

In 1974, Jarrige and her husband co-led the team that discovered Mehrgarh. Jarrige worked at Mehrgarh between December and March each year from 1975 until 1985, and from 1997 until 2000. During this time, Jarrige and her coworkers forged both professional and emotional connections with nearby villagers. They delayed their work in 2001, due to fighting in neighboring Afghanistan, and were unable to permanently return to the site due to increased conflict due to inter-tribal hostilities, which led to looting and destruction of the site and displacement of the local people whom they had worked with.

In the mid-2000s, Jarrige worked at a site near Mazar-i-Sharif, Afghanistan.

Jarrige also worked at and wrote about Nausharo, a Harappan period site in Balochistan.

Jarrige was particularly interested in the human figurines unearthed at the sites she worked at. She found that the older figurines tended to be of uncertain gender, with later figurines increasingly differentiating male or female physical characteristics. Male figurines ultimately made up 85% of the figurines found, with some holding infants, a subversion of "the usual perception of figurines serving as fertility icons"; she also described such figurines being found at Nausharo. Some of the youngest female figurines sported elaborate hairstyles and ornamentation.

== Personal life ==
Jarrige married fellow archaeologist Jean-Francois Jarrige in 1966. The couple had two daughters, who accompanied their parents to Mehrgarh during the excavation season.

== Publications ==
- Mehrgarh: Field Reports, 1974-1985, from Neolithic Times to the Indus Civilization : the Reports of Eleven Seasons of Excavations in Kachi District, Balochistan by the French Archaeological Mission to Pakistan (1995)

=== Articles ===
- Une tête d'éléphant en terre cuite de Nausharo (Pakistan) (1992)
- The figurines of the first farmers at Mehrgarh and their offshoots (2008)

=== Chapters ===
- Les figurines humaines au Baluchistan (1988)

=== Co-author ===
- Sickles and Harvesting Motions in Baluchistan (Pakistan) (1987)
- Early Neolithic tradition of dentistry (2006)
- Mehrgarh. Neolithic Period - Seasons 1997-2000: Pakistan (2013)

=== Editor ===
- South Asian archaeology, 1989 : papers from the Tenth International Conference of South Asian Archaeologists in Western Europe, Musée national des arts asiatiques-Guimet, Paris, France, 3–7 July 1989 (1992)
