= Babihan =

- Town and union council
- Country: Pakistan
- Region: Balochistan
- District: Sibi District
- Time zone: UTC+5 (PST)

Babihan is a town and union council of Sibi District in the Balochistan province of Pakistan.
