= Jean-François Jarrige =

French archeologist

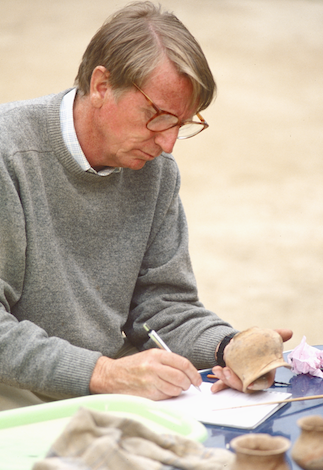
- Jarrige on the Mehrgarh archaeological site in 1993
- Born: 5 August 1940; Lourdes, Hautes-Pyrénées. France
- Died: 18 November 2014 (aged 74); Paris
- Occupations: Archaeologist, Museum curator
- Spouse: Catherine Jarrige
- Children: 2
- Awards: Legion of Honour, Ordre national du Mérite, Ordre des Palmes académiques, Ordre des Arts et des Lettres, Order of the Rising Sun, Star of Pakistan

Academic background
- Education: École du Louvre
- Alma mater: University of Paris
- Thesis: Contribution à une étude du peuplement des plaines Indo-gangétiques de la fin du 3e millénaire au début de la période historique

Academic work
- Discipline: Orientalist
- Sub-discipline: South Asian Archaeology, Sindhology
- Institutions: Musée Guimet
- Notable works: Excavation of Mehrgarh

Jean-François Jarrige (5 August 1940, Lourdes – 18 November 2014, Paris) was a French archaeologist specializing in South Asian archaeology and Sindhology. He held a doctorate from the University of Paris in oriental archaeology. He carried out the excavations in Balochistan, Mehrgarh and Pirak. In 2004, he became the director of the Musée Guimet in Paris.

== Biography ==
Jean-François Marie Charles Jarrige was born on 5 August 1940 in Lourdes, Hautes-Pyrénées, France. He studied at the École du Louvre where he was classmates with future-French president Jacques Chirac.

Jarrige was a specialist in Asian archeology, particularly South Asian, as was his wife, Catherine. The couple were responsible for the discovery in 1974 of the Neolithic settlement of Mehrgarh in Baluchistan, which they and their team excavated continuously from then until 1986.

Jarrige was the director of the Musée Guimet from 1986 until 2004, when he was made museum president. He directed a major overhaul of the museum's collection in 2000–2001, reorganizing according to place and time period. As part of his role with the museum, he was also the curator general of special expositions, such as the “Afghanistan: A Thousand Year-Old History” (Barcelona-Paris-Houston, 2001–2002) and "Afghanistan: Treasures Found in the Kabul Museum ”(December 2006 - April 2007) which featured finds from the Tillya Tepe site. He retired from the position in 2008.

His wife Catherine was also an archaeologist who worked with him on several sites. The couple had two daughters. Jarrige died 18 November 2014 in Paris following a long battle with stomach cancer.

== Honors and awards ==
- Commander of the Legion of Honour
- Commander of the Ordre national du Mérite
- Officer of the Ordre des Palmes académiques
- Commander of the Ordre des Arts et des Lettres
- Order of the Rising Sun, 3rd Class, Gold Rays with Neck Ribbon
- Order of Pakistan

== Works ==
- 1990 - La Préhistoire et la civilisation de l'Indus (editor)
- 1993 - The Early architectural traditions of the greater Indus Valley as seen from Mehrgarh, Balochistan, Pakistan
- 1995 - Du néolithique à la civilisation de l'Inde ancienne: contribution des recherches archéologiques dans le nord-ouest du sous-continent indo-pakistanais

== See also ==
- List of archaeologists
