= Sevi District =

District in Balochistan, Pakistan

Coordinates: 29°10′N 68°30′E

Sibi District ضلع سبی سبی دمگ
- District of Balochistan
- Map of Balochistan with Sibi District highlighted
- Country: Pakistan
- Province: Balochistan
- Division: Sibi
- Headquarters: Sibi

Government
  - Type: District Administration
  - Deputy Commissioner: N/A
  - District Police Officer: SSP Akhtar Nawaz Tanoli
  - District Health Officer: N/A

Area
  - District of Balochistan: 7,121 km^{2} (2,749 sq mi)

Population (2023)
  - District of Balochistan: 224,148
  - Density: 31.48/km^{2} (81.53/sq mi)
  - Urban: 69,300
  - Rural: 154,848

Literacy
  - Literacy rate: Total: (47.41%); Male: (55.72%); Female: (38.63%)
- Time zone: UTC+5 (PST)
- Number of Tehsils: 4

Sibi (Urdu and Balochi: سبی) is a district in the Balochistan province of Pakistan. The climate and topography of Sibi District are quite varied compared to the other districts of Balochistan. It is also known as the "hotspot" of Pakistan, where the temperatures in the summer exceeded 52.6 °C (126.7 °F). Until 2002, the district had two subdivisions, Sibi and Harnai, further organized into Tehsils and sub-tehsils: Sibi, Kutmandi and Sangan. Lehri was joined with Sibi district in 2002 and Harnai was made a separate district. Sibi tehsil is predominantly inhabited by Baloch tribes (Silachi, Rind, Marri, Magsi) and Pashtun tribes of Panni (Barozai, Luni, Khajjak Nodhani, etc.). The town of Sibi is chiefly built upon lands of Marghazani and Dehpal.

== History ==
The early recorded history of Sibi District begins with the Hindu Sewa dynasty. The Hindu Sewa dynasty ruled much of Baluchistan up until the 7th century AD. The Sibi division carved out of Quetta division still derives its name from Rani Sewi, the queen of the Hindu Sewa dynasty.

Mir Chakar Rind ruled Sibi for about thirty years. During his rule, Sibi became the main center of Baloch power. His leadership made Sibi the political and cultural heart of the Rind confederation.

Until the end of the 15th century the district had been a dependency of Multan and had been part of Ghaznavid Empire ruled by a petty chief named Nasiruddin Kabacha. Around 1500 it was taken by Shah Beg of the Arghun dynasty from Samma dynasty of Sindh and so came under the control of Kandahar. The remainder of Arghuns in Sibi were defeated by Panni (Pashtun tribe) of Sangan and kut mundai, thus the Pannis conquered Sibi and Dhadar plains. Pannis of Sibi and Dhadar under their chiefs Malik Yahya Mizri & Jangi Khan Panni defeated the Mughal forces twice but surrendered the Sibi Fort after a third valiant resistance. Thus the territory came under Mughal rule.

During the rule of Aurangzeb, Junaid khan Barozai, head of Panni (Pashtun tribe) of Sibi was granted authority over Sibi & Kachhi area and was titled 'Bakhtiar Khan', he was succeeded by his son Mirza khan, who was officially declared a Nawab by Aurangzeb and also given administration over Shikarpur, Sindh. Nawab Mirza khan Barozai lead the Pannis successfully in initial 16 out of 18 battles fought against Khan of Kalat of Mir Ahmad Khan, during the 17th engagement at a spot called Pir Lekhan, neither sides emerged victorious but Mir Ahmad himself, and his Minister, Akhund Mohammad Saleh, were both wounded and Mir Shawaz and Mir Ibrahim, the latter an ancestor of the Nausherwani Sardar Mir Azad Khan, lost their lives. The Brahuis left the battlefield; the Pannis collected the booty, consisting of silken belts and horses of Turki and Tazi breed. Mir Ahmad Qambrani's sister named Bibo gallantly attacked the Pannis attired in male garments. She fought valiantly and was killed at the hands of Jalal Khan Panni. In 1695, the Khan of Kalat received the intelligence about the absence of Mirza Khan from Sibi. He planned a well-thought-out attack on Sibi. Skirting Sibi and Dhadar he reached unnoticed above the Silachi village of Talli, and thus caught Rahim Khan Pirani (commander of Pannis of Sibi) unprepared. The latter, shocked and surprised, faced the Qambranis on the Luni irrigation channel. For lack of initiative and timely decision on the part of Rahim Khan, Pannis lost the battle. Nawab Mirza Khan learnt about this debacle in Shikarpur. He rushed to Sibi, organized the disheartened Pannis into a fighting contingent and headed for Kalat. The Khan of Kalat gathered his forces in the fort of Kalat. After a few skirmishes both sides thought it prudent to negotiate terms. Peace prevailed between the two confederacies, which was sealed by a happy marriage of Princess Mahnaz the daughter of Mir Ahmad Qambrani with Saeed Khan Barozai Panni, brother of Mirza Khan Barozai. It was agreed upon that Brahvis of Kalat would be allowed to graze their flocks in Kachhi plains.

Nawab Mirza khan Barozai was succeeded by his son Nawab Bakhtiar khan (2nd), titled 'Bakht Buland khan' by the Mughals, he fought the famous Mughal-Afghan battle of Uch in January 1702, against the Mughal forces led by Prince Muhammad Muizudin the Subahdar of Multan. Nawab Bakhtiar khan, along with 400-500 of his men, was killed.

The government over Sibi and Dhadar territory was handed over to Kalhoras of Sindh by the Mughals. During this period, Rahim Parang and Doulat Khan Barozai revolted, but the insurrection was crushed. Again Rahim, Yusuf and other Afghans revolted and succeeded in recapturing Sibi and Dhadar from Kalhoras on 25 February 1708. Kalhoras once again attacked SIWI and Dhadar and fought a battle with Pannis who were then being led by one Sardar Paniu Khan (his particulars are not known). In this battle, Panju Khan, along with many Afghans, was killed, whereas his colleagues Sabzal Khan and Doulat Khan Barozai sued for peace. Thus, Sibi and Dhadar were again, in the months of March and April 1708, restored to Kalhora rule. Pannis lost about 1000 men in the course of the 37-day-long Kalhora-Panni battle for SIWI and Dhadar. Mir Abdul Jalil Bilgrami has recorded this famous and prolonged battle in the form of a poem. All this information has been obtained from Kalhora sources like Manshurul-Wassiat & Guldasta-e-Nouras Bähär.

In 1714, Yar Muhammad Kalhoro with the title of Khuda Yar Khan acquired SIWI and Dhadar from Mughals. He was succeeded by Noor Mohammad Kalhoro also known as Khuda Yar Khan who in 1730 A.D. fought Battle of Kachhi and killed Abdullah Khan Brahvi the then Khan of Kalat somewhere near Lehri village. After Nader Shah's invasion of India, Dhadar and Kachhi (excluding Sibi plains & Sangan) were handed over to the refugee sons of Khan Kalat by Nadir Shah as compensation for the blood of Khan Abdullah Khan. During the rule of the Ahmad Shah Durrani, Panni chief Nawab Ismail Khan Barozai was handed the administration of Sibi and adjoining areas. On the death in 1753 of Mir Nur Mohammad Kalhora, Ahmad Shah Abdali made the Panni Nawab a royal representative in the newly acquired Sind Province. To quell the running dispute between Kalhoras and Daudpotras about the possession of the town of Shikarpur, it was also, once again, handed over to the Afghans of Siwi. But unfortunately, Panni Afghan forces of Nawwab Ismail Khan indulged in unworthy conduct of plundering the local populace in Sindh. As a result of this, differences arose between the Panni Nawwab and Mohammad Beg Shamlu- the royal ambassador in Sindh. This confrontation resulted in Sind province again reverting to the rule of Kalhoras. The town of Shikarpur, however, continued under the rule of the Pannis of Siwi for some more time. The town, as well as the whole area, benefited from this arrangement greatly because a brisk trade between Sindh and Siwi-Ouetta-Pishin Region on the one hand and Afghanistan and Central Asian cities on the other sprang up. This trade was, afterwards, interrupted partly because of the poor law and order situation in the then southern Afghanistan during the twenty year's rule of Taimur Shah, son of Ahmad Shah Abdali, which lasted from 1772 to 1793 A.D.

In the possession of Nawab Ghous Bakhsh Barozai, present de jure head of Siwi Afghans, there is a sunnud/letter of Ahmed Shah Abdali, which is dated 28th Rabiul Awwal 1172 A.H (1758) and reads as recorded below:

" Before this I had, through separate written orders, awarded the government of Sibi territory to Isa Khan Durrani Panni ( Nawab Ismail khans son) and the government of the forts of Barah-Kam(Barkhan) and Khetran and Hasni to Mohammad Khan Durrani Panni (Nawab Ismail khans brother). But now I award the government of the above-mentioned Mahals to be held by Umdatul-Khawanin (the best of the Khans) Ismail Khan Durrani Panni, Isa Khan and Mohammad Khan jointly. All the three will perform social, military and revenue functions in respect of these areas jointly and under the overall supervision of Ismail Khan because he is both aged, knowledgeable and experienced of all of them. To Ismail Khan, I entrust the whole range of matters connected with the punishment, patronage and administration of Panni tribe- so that he attends to his duties with care and gives good performance. Isa Khan, Mohammad Khan, zamindars, nobles and general Panni public should keep within the limits prescribed by me. State functionaries should also enforce above mentioned orders"

Another important fact which these letters bring to light is that, until the winters of 1758 A.D., Marri tribe had not as yet occupied Kahan and Kohlu areas – both of which tracts were still in the possession of the Hasni and Zarkun Afghans. It is sometime after the winter of 1758 that Khetran, Hasni and Zarkun Afghans were attacked and considerably weakened twice by the forces of Mohammad Khan Panni and then(perhaps after the death of Ahmed Shah Abdali) by the Marri tribe encouraged and practically assisted by Mir Nasir Khan I. A story is still current that an emissary belonging to Sumarani Marri subsection had been sent to the Khan of Kalat to ask for help. When in durbar, he killed a dangerous snake and thus earned the good will of the chief. This, among other things, led to Khan furnishing an army for the support of Marris against Hasnis.

"When rebelled against the Shah the news spread like wild-fire. Among other things he instigated Dumar Afghans to attack and plunder the Panni headquarters of Sangan village. For this purpose he tampered with the loyalty of Sardar Haider Khan Dumar regardless of the fact that the latter was one of the most trustworthy friends of the Baruzais. Sardar Haider Khan, one fine morning, appeared before the Sangan fort with a considerable force. At that time Rashid Khan son of Nawwab Ismail Khan Panni happened to be present in the Sangan Fort. He immediately shifted inside, the Afghan nomads, who were camping outside the walls of the fort and ordered the trees, around the Sangan fort to be cut down in order to eliminate the chances of enemy taking shelter behind these trees. Soon after Dumar forces surrounded the Sangan Fort and started firing at the garrison. This continued for quite sometime. Becoming impatient Kahlil Khan shouted at Rashid Khan "why not go out of the fort and fight the enemy in the open". This suggestion was immediately accepted and Pannis rushed out to give battle to Dumar in the open fields. After a severe engagement and lot of massacre Dumars forces broke and ran. It is said that as a result of this battle' Sardar Haider Khan Dumar, having been hit in the leg, became lame and could not walk properly for the rest of his life" Nawab Ismail khan Barozai Panni must have been a famous and popular ruler because the well-known and often quoted saying "Bani to Bani-Nahin to Daud Khan Panni" attributed to Daud Khan Panni of all-India fame is frequently amended by the local Barozais so as to declare that "Bani to Bani-Nahin to Ismail Khan Panni". Nawab Ismail Khan Panni died about 1762 A.D and lies buried in a tomb, still intact, situated about two furlongs southeast of the remote but historic Panni village of Sangan, Pakistan. According to Mulla Fazil, on the death of his father, Isa Khan Panni wrote a letter to Ahmad Shah Abdali informing him of the demise of late Nawab Ismail Khan Panni. Ahmad Shah replied to the letter offering condolences and also conferring the title of Bakhtiar Khan on Isa Khan Panni. Two years after Isa Khan/Bakhtiar Khan Panni(3rd) of Sangan became the ruler of the Confederacy, he, in 1764, was summoned by the Shah and, therefore, took out a force to assist him in a fight against Sikhs in Punjab. On page 60/70 of 'Jang Nama' of Qazi Nur Mohammad Kalhora, we find a heading as follows:

"WHEN BAKHTIAR KHAN PANNI'S FORCES JOINED THAT OF THE KHAN”

According to Qazi's narrative Bakhtiar Khan (the Third) came over and joined Mir Nasir Khan of Kalat at a time when the latter's forces were about to cross the Indus River in Dera Ghazi Khan area. As a result of his arrival Khan of Kalat was detained near the ford for some days so that he could organize a reception (feast) on the river bank in the honour of the Khan of Panni Afghans. This family needed no introduction, says Qazi, because they had produced about 13 generations of ruling Khans. The Khan(Nawab) of the Pannis came with a force made up of one thousand brave fighters. After the reception was over both the Brahvi as well as the Afghan forces crossed the Indus River in boats. While marching on the other side of Indus River the two Khans indulged themselves in game-hunting till they reached Sahiwal which is a tract of land enclosed by the Jhelum and the Chenab Rivers- says Qazi. There, the Khan of Kalat, having received express summonses from Ahmad Shah Abdali left in haste to meet the latter. The concentration of as many as five Brahvi women of the family of Khan of Kalat must have eroded the tenuous fabric of Afghan culture in the household of the Nawabs of Panni.

Around the end of rule of Sadozais and beginning of rule of Barakzais, unity and faith among Panni confederacy of Sibi and Sangan broke apart and bitter civil war started. About 1813 A.D. Ahmad Yar Khan son of Behram Khan, Sarfraz Khan son of Mir Mustafa Khan and Mai Zenab daughter of Mir Nasir Khan I are granted political asylum by Khajjak chief Meer Khan. Sometime after 1813 A.D. Khajjak Panni Afghan chief named Meer Khan attacks & destroys the village of the Afghan tribe of Marghzanis(Pannis) who consequently migrate to and take refugee with the Panni Afghan tribe of Dehpals. Khajjaks also deprive Marghzanis, of their share of water in the Nari river. However, Meer Khan is himself killed by a matchlock ball during the same fight. About 1825 A.D. Baruzai chief of Siwi Habib Khan son of Ahmed Yar Khan s/o Mohammad khan panni, was murdered by Khajjaks after notorious Haji Khan Kakar, then an agent of Mohammadzai Sardars of Kandhar had first been bribed by them. This incident took place during a Darbar held at Kurak village. According to Moulvi Abdul Haleem of Kurk the news of the murder of Habib Khan was carried by one of his Silachi servants to the village of Talli. As a result, a Silachi (Tarin Afghan) force rushed to the scene of murder where they found and attacked Haji Khan's party. In the ensuing clash Haji received a severe beating whereas several of his party were killed and all their belongings plundered. Approximately between 1825 - 1826 A.D. Hibib Khan's brother Saadullah Khan Baruzai also came to be murdered by the Khajjaks at the shrine of the famous saint Akhund Sahib (Mulla Mali) of the Safi tribe during the course of afternoon prayers. Immediately before the prayers, a tribal jirga had decided that there will no more be bloodshed amongst the Afghan owners of lands and water, as stated by Qazi Abdul Haleem, Khajjaks and some of the Pannis violated the oath on Quran immediately after they had taken it, and murdered the Baruzai Khan. During this period Khajjak Barozai differences forced Misri Khan Barozai to lead the British forces to Siwi and surround Khajjaks in their village, which eventually led to a fight. The historical consequences of this fight are stated to be quite damaging to the interests of the Afghans of the region because the powerful tribe of the Khajjaks had always acted as a psychological, if not physical, bulwark against the Marri depredations in Sibi and Dhadar plains. Misri Khan, who tendered his services to Shah Shuja and was taken into British pay. In 1841, as already described in the section on History, the town of Khajjaks was occupied by British troops and dismantled. The power of the Khajjaks was thus weakened, and shortly afterwards the Marris acquired a footing in the Sibi District. They dispossessed the Pannis of Badra and Quat Mandi. There are several battles such as that of Jangjah (near Nari Gorge) in which they attacked and brutally murdered other Pannis who were unarmed and were busy in clearing the main irrigation canal. This was very unfortunate because it is stated to have happened in violation of a Quranic oath which the Khajjaks had taken earlier at the Safi's Mosque situated near the shrine of Akhund Sahib north of Kurak village. In this battle, 21 Pannis were killed and many more wounded. Tradition says that Misri Khan Barozai once led a defending force composed of the Panni tribesmen then living in Kurak village, during an attack against that village by another force led by Fateh Khan Behramzai (Khajjak). This battle is stated to have been fought about three miles to the west of the Kurak village near a bridge (on a canal) commonly known as the bridge of the earcasses' In order to cut off the escape route and to take possession of the defenseless village at the time of victory, Fateh Khan Bahramzai had earlier divided his force into two parties. One of it was to lie in ambush at some distance, in a dry irrigation channel, running east of Kurak village. The other party, composed of horsemen, was to attack the opponents from the western side of the village. This battle was fiercely contested for quite some time but, in the end resulted in a defeat for Khajjaks whose commander Fateh Khan was one of the many casualties. Misri Khan himself was fatally wounded in the battle, died three days later and was buried at the Kurak village Graveyard of the Martyrs'. He died between 1855 and 1860 A.D and was succeeded by his brother Bakhtiar Khan, the latter had a son named Akhtiar Khan. Once on a secret information, Akhtiar Khan led a force which, much to their discredit, brutally murdered a small group of nine Khajjaks who were travelling, along with some Domkis, to the Bhag town to purchase much-needed articles of daily use. Akhtiar khan was killed treacherously by his companion during the same fight and was succeeded by his cousin Sardar Muhammad khan Barozai (later on made member of British Shahi Jirga)

Between 1830 and 1878, for about half a century, Pannis of Sibi resisted successfully the repeated attacks of Marris for capturing the Sibi and Sangan - without any help from the Afghanistan of which they were an integral part.

In 1879, through Treaty of Gandamak Jurisdiction over the Korram and Pishin valleys, the Sibi district, and the Khybar pass were transferred to the British.

The District of Sibi was established in 1903 during British Rule its area was larger than the current district and lay between 27°55' and 30°38'N and 67°17' and 69°50'E lying south of Loralai District, north of the Upper Sind Frontier District, west of Dera Ghazi Khan District and east of Kachhi, Bolan Pass and Quetta- Pishin. The total area of the district was 11,281 square miles (29,220 km^{2}), but this included Marri Bugti county (7,129 square miles) which not directly administered by the British, leaving 4,152 square miles (10,750 km^{2}) that were directly administered by the British The population according to the 1901 census of India was 74,555 or 18 persons per square mile, the district contained four tehsils these were:

Tahsil	Area (sq mi)	Population
Kohlu	362	1,743
Sibi	1,343	20,526
Shahrig	1,595	16,573
Naseerabad	852	33,713
Total	4,152	74,555

In 1974, the district was subdivided to create Naseerabad and Kohlu districts, in 1983 Dera Bugti District, and in 1986 Ziarat District. Until 2000, except for Naseerabad, these new districts were part of Sibi Division of Pakistan. In 2000 the third-tier "divisions" structure of government was dissolved. Two further new districts were cleaved out of its territory: Harnai in 2007 and Lehri in 2013. Lehri was reannexed into Sibi in 2018.

== Administration ==
Tehsil	Area (km^{2})	Pop. (2023)	Density (ppl/km^{2}) (2023)	Literacy rate (2023)	Union Councils
Sibi Tehsil	1,949	154,970	79.51	52.40%	...
Kutmandai Tehsil	1,977	9,748	4.93	8.93%	...
Sangan Tehsil	1,378	5,431	3.94	22.67%	...
Lehri tehsil	1,817	53,999	29.72	40.79%	...

== Demographics ==
Historical population
Year	Pop.	±% p.a.
1951	N/A	—
1961	N/A	—
1972	N/A	—
1981	N/A	—
1998	136,322	—
2017	179,751	+1.47%
2023	224,148	+3.75%

=== Population ===
As of the 2023 census, Sibi district has 31,296 households and a population of 224,148. The district has a sex ratio of 105.43 males to 100 females and a literacy rate of 47.41%: 55.72% for males and 38.63% for females. 79,613 (35.52% of the surveyed population) are under 10 years of age. 69,300 (30.92%) live in urban areas.

=== Religion ===
Religions in Sibi district (2023)
Religion	Percent
Islam	96.57%
Hinduism	2.9%
Christianity	0.51%
Other or not stated	0.02%

Islam was the predominant religion with 96.57%, while Hindus were 2.9% of the population and Christians were 0.51% of the population.

Religious groups in Sibi District (Administered Areas & Marri-Bugti Country) (British Baluchistan era)
Religious group	1901		1911		1921		1931		1941	
Religious group	Pop.	%	Pop.	%	Pop.	%	Pop.	%	Pop.	%
Islam	104,905	93.65%	108,473	92.56%	111,520	93.35%	135,710	94.9%	157,706	95.64%
Hinduism	6,560	5.86%	7,420	6.33%	6,449	5.4%	5,893	4.12%	6,425	3.9%
Sikhism	414	0.37%	1,068	0.91%	1,299	1.09%	1,127	0.79%	566	0.34%
Christianity	127	0.11%	192	0.16%	183	0.15%	234	0.16%	200	0.12%
Zoroastrianism	14	0.01%	27	0.02%	10	0.01%	6	0%	1	0%
Judaism	4	0%	9	0.01%	3	0%	0	0%	0	0%
Jainism	0	0%	0	0%	0	0%	0	0%	0	0%
Buddhism	—N/a	—N/a	0	0%	0	0%	1	0%	1	0%
Tribal	—N/a	—N/a	—N/a	—N/a	—N/a	—N/a	32	0.02%	0	0%
Others	0	0%	0	0%	0	0%	2	0%	0	0%
Total population	112,024	100%	117,189	100%	119,464	100%	143,005	100%	164,899	100%
Note: British Baluchistan era district borders are not an exact match in the present-day due to various bifurcations to district borders — which since created new districts — throughout the region during the post-independence era that have taken into account population increases. 1901 census figures for the Sibi District administered area are for Thal-Chotiali District, which was abolished and bifurcated in 1903 with the majority added to the administered area of Sibi District and a smaller portion added to the newly created Loralai District.

Religious groups in the Administered Areas of Sibi District (British Baluchistan era)
Religious group	1901		1911		1921		1931		1941	
Religious group	Pop.	%	Pop.	%	Pop.	%	Pop.	%	Pop.	%
Islam	66,398	90.83%	74,078	89.88%	74,790	90.72%	80,807	92.06%	99,875	93.53%
Hinduism	6,148	8.41%	7,049	8.55%	6,155	7.47%	5,572	6.35%	6,144	5.75%
Sikhism	414	0.57%	1,068	1.3%	1,299	1.58%	1,127	1.28%	566	0.53%
Christianity	127	0.17%	192	0.23%	183	0.22%	234	0.27%	200	0.19%
Zoroastrianism	14	0.02%	27	0.03%	10	0.01%	6	0.01%	1	0%
Judaism	4	0.01%	9	0.01%	3	0%	0	0%	0	0%
Jainism	0	0%	0	0%	0	0%	0	0%	0	0%
Buddhism	—N/a	—N/a	0	0%	0	0%	1	0%	1	0%
Tribal	—N/a	—N/a	—N/a	—N/a	—N/a	—N/a	32	0.04%	0	0%
Others	0	0%	0	0%	0	0%	2	0%	0	0%
Total population	73,105	100%	82,423	100%	82,440	100%	87,781	100%	106,787	100%
Note: British Baluchistan era district borders are not an exact match in the present-day due to various bifurcations to district borders — which since created new districts — throughout the region during the post-independence era that have taken into account population increases. 1901 census figures for the Administered Areas of Sibi District are for Thal-Chotiali District, which was abolished and bifurcated in 1903 with the majority added to the administered area of Sibi District and a smaller portion added to the newly created Loralai District.

Religious groups in the Marri-Bugti Country of Sibi District (British Baluchistan era)
Religious group	1901		1911		1921		1931		1941	
Religious group	Pop.	%	Pop.	%	Pop.	%	Pop.	%	Pop.	%
Islam	38,507	98.94%	34,395	98.93%	36,730	99.21%	54,903	99.42%	57,831	99.52%
Hinduism	412	1.06%	371	1.07%	294	0.79%	321	0.58%	281	0.48%
Sikhism	0	0%	0	0%	0	0%	0	0%	0	0%
Christianity	0	0%	0	0%	0	0%	0	0%	0	0%
Zoroastrianism	0	0%	0	0%	0	0%	0	0%	0	0%
Judaism	0	0%	0	0%	0	0%	0	0%	0	0%
Jainism	0	0%	0	0%	0	0%	0	0%	0	0%
Buddhism	—N/a	—N/a	0	0%	0	0%	0	0%	0	0%
Tribal	—N/a	—N/a	—N/a	—N/a	—N/a	—N/a	0	0%	0	0%
Others	0	0%	0	0%	0	0%	0	0%	0	0%
Total population	38,919	100%	34,766	100%	37,024	100%	55,224	100%	58,112	100%

=== Languages ===
Languages of Sibi district (2023)
1. Balochi (44.1%)
2. Sindhi (23.5%)
3. Pashto (13.4%)
4. Saraiki (13.4%)
5. Brahui (2.91%)
6. Urdu (1.31%)
7. Others (1.38%)

At the time of the 2023 census, 44.15% of the population spoke Balochi, 23.5% Sindhi, 13.3% Saraiki, 13.4% Pashto, 2.91% Brahui, 1.31% Urdu as their first language.

== Transport ==
Sibi is on the western edge of Pakistan and is well connected with the country by a wide network of roads, railways and airways.

=== Railways ===
Sibi Railway Station is a junction railway station. The railway track was laid in the 1890s during the British era to link Sibi with the rest of the country.

== Festivals ==
The famous Sibi Mela first held in January 1885 a market for Livestock trade with passage of time adopted as cultural show, tent pegging, departmental exhibitions, musical show and sports festivals.

== See also ==
- Saddar Harnai

== Bibliography ==
- 1998 District census report of Sibi. Census publication. Vol. 17. Islamabad: Population Census Organization, Statistics Division, Government of Pakistan. 1999.
