= Ocepur railway station =

Railway station in Pakistan

General information
- Owner: Ministry of Railways

Other information
- Station code: OCP

History
- Former names: Great Indian Peninsula Railway
Location

Ocepur (Osepur) Railway station (Urdu: اوسی پور ریلوے اسٹیشن) is an abandoned railway station located in Pakistan. Built by the British Raj in 1881 as a military outpost to support if any possible russian invasion happened. After the Independence of Pakistan in 1947 The Balochistan Governemnt decided to abandon Ocepur as there was no use of it being at least 35 kilometers from a city , Sibi which also had its own train track.

== See also ==
- List of railway stations in Pakistan
- Pakistan Railways
