= Nausharo =

Archaeological site in Pakistan

Coordinates: 29.365°N 67.588°E

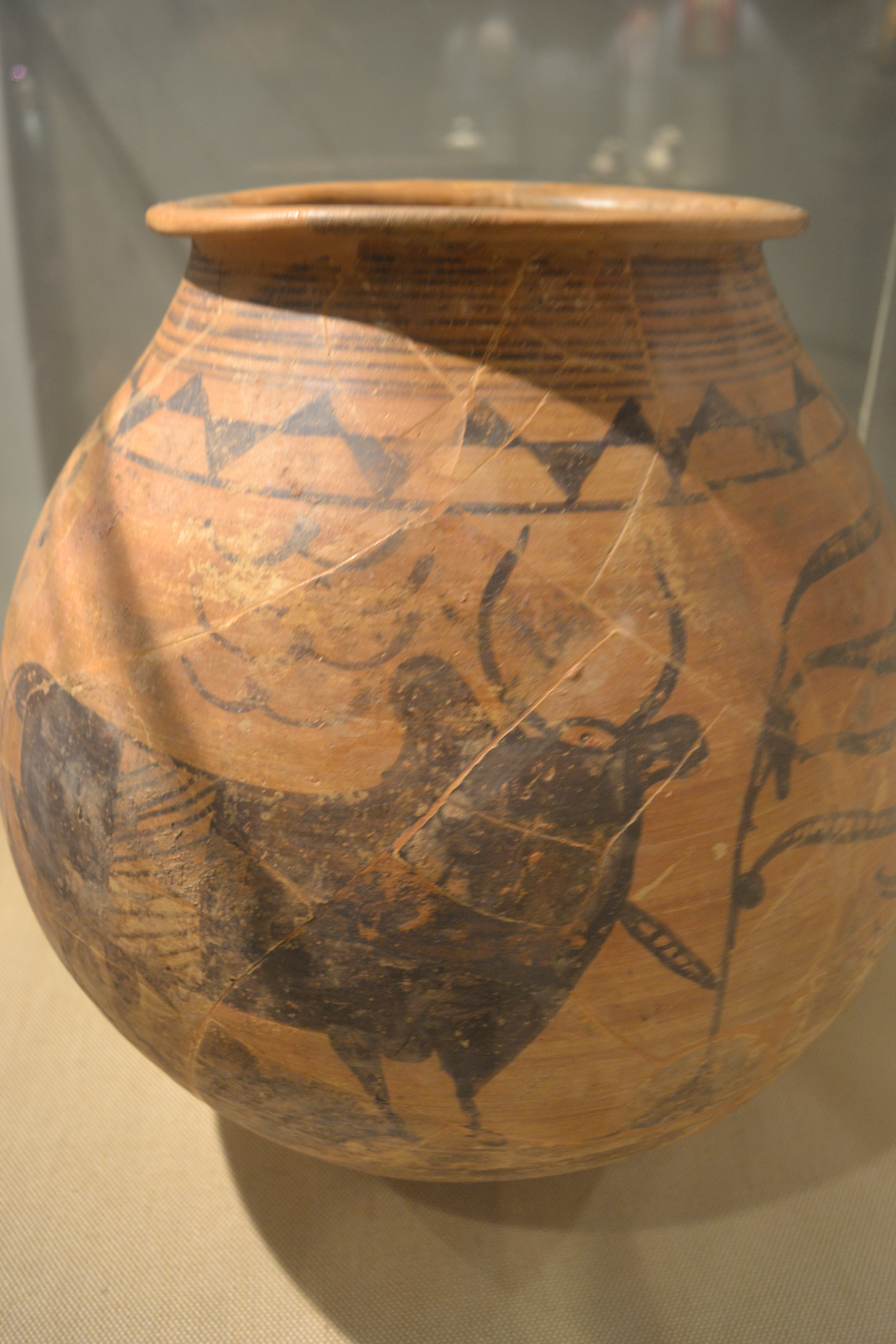
- "Naushahdu Matka", a jar made around (2700 – 1800 BC) found in Nausharo
- Periods: Mature Indus Valley civilization
- Location: Balochistan, Pakistan

Site notes
- Excavation dates: 1985–1996
- Archaeologists: French team led by Jean-François Jarrige
- Condition: Ruins

Nausharo is an archaeological site dating back to the Harappan period, located in Balochistan, Pakistan. The excavations were carried out between 1985 and 1996 by a French team of archaeologists, under the direction of Jean-François Jarrige. The other sites belonging to the same cluster are Mehrgarh and Pirak.

== Nausharo excavation ==
Excavations at Nausharo, 6 km from Mehrgarh, revealed a dwelling-site contemporaneous and identical to the later periods of Mehrgarh. It was occupied between 3000 and 2550 BC and again between 2550 and 1900 BC.

=== Pottery workshop ===
The discovery of a pottery workshop at Nausharo revealed fired and unfired pottery pieces and unworked clay, as well as 12 flint blades or blade fragments. The blades showed use-wear traces that indicates their usage in shaving clay while shaping pottery on a potter's wheel. The excavated blades were compared to experimentally produced replica blades used for a variety of other activities such as harvesting and processing of silica-rich plants, hide processing, and hand-held use for shaping clay; however, the use-wear traces were almost identical to the excavated blades when used with a mechanical potter's wheel in the shaping of clay pots. Also significant was the discovery of copper traces found on the platforms of two blades examined with a scanning electron microscope and X ray analysis.

== Chronology ==
Mature Indus Valley Civilisation is believed to begin around 2600–2450 BC, during Mehrgarh VII period (2600 BC–2000 BC). This time period also corresponds to Nausharo I (Kot Diji phase), and Nausharo II periods.

Somewhere between 2600 BC and 2000 BC (Mehrgarh Period VII), Mehrgarh seems to have been largely abandoned in favor of Nausharo, which became fortified and quite large. Historian Michael Wood suggests this abandonment took place around 2500 BCE.

According to Jarrige, period I of Nausharo corresponds to Mehrgarth VII, while periods II and III were during the mature Harappan civilization.

The more detailed chronology of Nausharo is usually given as follows,

- Period IA c. 2900–2800 BC
- Period IB c. 2800–2700 BC
- Period IC c. 2700–2600 BC
- Period ID c. 2600–2550 BC (transition period)
- Period IIA c. 2550–2300 BC
- Period IIB c. 2300–1900 BC
- Period III c. 1900–1800 BC

== See also ==
- Indus Valley civilization
- List of Indus Valley Civilization sites
- List of inventions and discoveries of the Indus Valley Civilization
- Hydraulic engineering of the Indus Valley Civilization
- Mehrgarh
- Pirak
