= Kurak, Pakistan =

Villate in Pakistan

Kurak is a village at a 4 kilometers distance from Sibi city of Balochistan, Pakistan. The Kurak Town is the head quarter of Panni Tribe and ancestral village of Nawab barozai.

== See also ==
- Sibi District
- Mehergarh
- Sevi
- Bibi Nani
- khajjak
- Dehpal
- Marghazani
