= Barozai =

Pashtun ethnic group in Afghanistan

Barozai (Pashto: باروزی) is a clan of Balailzai, a Pashtun tribe in Afghanistan and Pakistan. Panni (Panri) are also known as Balailzai. The Panni are descended from Gharghasht, one of Qais Abdur Rashid sons. They originated around the present Pakistan-Afghanistan border, and later mostly resettled in Karachi, Quetta, Zhob, Sibi, Sangan, Musakhail, Harnai, Dera Ismail Khan, Ziarat, Mardan, Peshawar, Kabul, Tank, Kohat.

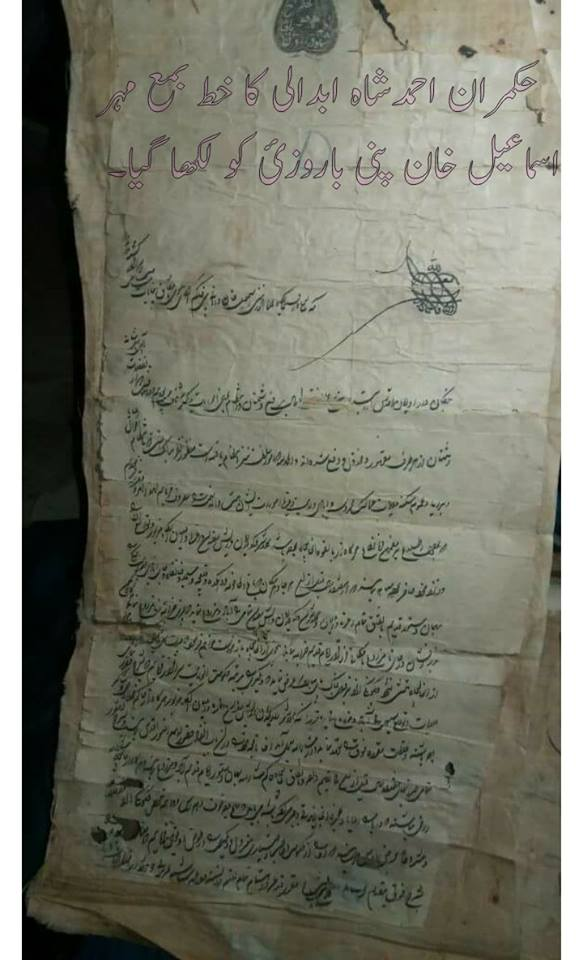
Ahmad Shah Durrani Sanads 1753 A.D

The Afghan which Malik Jiwan (Sardar Junnaid Khan Panni Barozai) lay under obligations to the prince. A town which is notoriously the hottest inhabited place Dara Shikoh wished to rest from the fatigues of the journey entered the territory of Dhadar on 11 June 1659 A.D.) The Barozais were often appointed as Governors of Sibi by the Mughal Emperors and The Chief of the Panni (Panri) tribe Nawab Mirza Khan Barozai who had received the title of Nawab from Mughal Emperor Aurangzeb and also administered the affairs of upper Sindh, and carried out administration of Sibi on the behalf of Afghan Rulers. The Sanads given by Ahmad Shah Durrani to Sardar Ismail Khan Panni Barozai and Nawab Muhammad Khan Panni Barozai in the 19th Zilhaj 1166 A.H. (1753 A.D.). The Afghan King Timur Shah Durrani also given Sanads to Ahmadyar khan Panni, Mahmood khan and Muhammad Rahim khan Pannis in 8th Muharram 1201 A.H. ( 1781) In the British Raj influence started extending to Sibi region in 1839 Misri Khan Barozai the head of Panri tribe tendered his services to Shah Shuja Durrani and was taken into British services with the number of his followers.

Additionally, Nawab Muhammad Khan Barozai was appointed as the Speaker of the Balochistan Assembly in 1988, and Qazi Ahmad Hassan Barozai was appointed by the Government as Qazi in Zhob, Balochistan, Pakistan before the partition of Pakistan.

The Current Tumandar and Chief of Panni (Panri) Tribe is

Nawab Ghous Bakhsh Khan Barozai

== Nawabs of Barozai Tribe ==
Baru Khan Barozai

Ayub Khan Barozai

Sardar Junaid Khan Barozai

Nawab Mirza Khan Barozai

Nawab Bakhtiyar Khan Barozai

Nawab Muhabbat Khan Barozai

Nawab Doulat Khan Barozai

Nawab Muhammad Khan Barozai

Nawab Ahmed Khan Barozai

Nawab Habib Khan Barozai

Nawab Sher Zaman Khan Barozai

Nawab Shakar Khan Barozai 1841

Khan Bahadur Nawab Mustafa Khan Barozai 1901

Khan Bahadur Nawab Samandar Khan Barozai 1946

Nawab Muhammad Khan Barozai

Nawab Ghous Bakhsh Khan Barozai

== See also ==
- Nawab Ghous Bakhsh Barozai
