= Nawab Ghous Bakhsh Barozai =

Pakistani politician

Nawab Ghous Bakhsh Khan Barozai
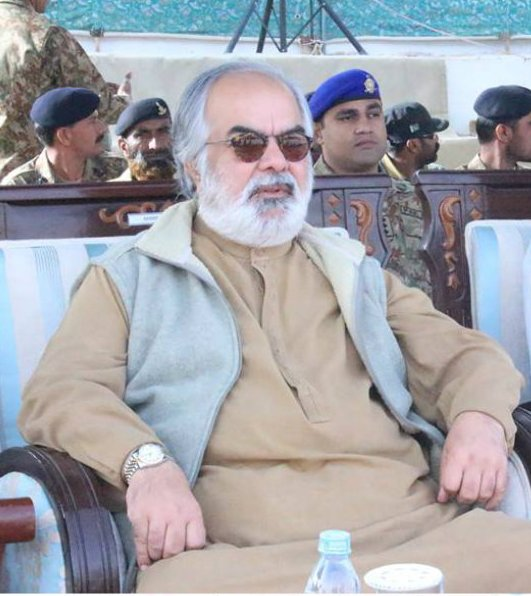

Chief Minister of Balochistan
- Caretaker
- In office March 24, 2013 – June 6, 2013
- President: Asif Ali Zardari
- Prime Minister: Raja Pervez Ashraf
- Governor: Zulfikar Ali Magsi
- Preceded by: Nawab Aslam Raisani
- Succeeded by: Abdul Malik Baloch

Personal details
- Citizenship: Pakistani

Nawab Ghous Bakhsh Khan Barozai was the interim 20th Chief Minister of Balochistan. He was appointed to the post after nomination by former chief minister Nawab Muhammad Aslam Raisani and the leader of the opposition, Nawabzada Tariq Magsi. Nawab Ghous Bakhsh Barozai is a member of the Barozai clan of the Balailzai (Panni) tribe. He was the Current Tumandar of the Barozai Tribe.
