= Sibi =

Sibi سبی
- City
- Location within Balochistan, Pakistan Location within Pakistan
- Coordinates: 29°33′N 67°53′E
- Country: Pakistan
- Province: Balochistan
- District: Sibi

Government
  - Type: Municipal Committee
  - Chairman: Muhammad Khan Khajjak

Area
  - City: 346 km^{2} (134 sq mi)
- Elevation: 130 m (430 ft)

Population (2023)
  - City: 69,300
  - Rank: 187th in Pakistan
  - Density: 200/km^{2} (519/sq mi)
- Time zone: UTC+5 (PST)
- Postal code: 82000
- Calling code: 833

Sibi (Balochi: سِبّی; Urdu: سبی;) is a city situated in the Balochistan province of Pakistan. The city serves as the administrative headquarters of the district and tehsil of the same name.

== Etymology ==
The origin of the town's name is attributed to Rani Sewi, a Hindu lady of the Sewa Dynasty who ruled Balochistan before the 7th century.

== Geography ==
The climate and topography of Sibi District are quite varied compared to other districts of Balochistan, being particularly prone to heatwaves. The district has two tehsils, Sibi and Lehri, which are further organized into sub-tehsils.

Sibi is connected to Quetta via the Bolan Pass and Nari Pass through Harnai.

== History ==
Until the end of the 10th century, the district had been a dependency of Multan and had been part of Ghaznavid Empire, ruled by a petty chief named Nasiruddin Kubacha.

Mir Chakar Rind ruled Sibi for about thirty years. During his rule, Sibi became the main center of Baloch power. His leadership made Sibi the political and cultural heart of the Rind confederation.

Around 1500, it was taken by Shah Beg of the Arghun dynasty from the Samma dynasty of Sindh and so it came under the control of Kandahar. The remainder of Arghuns in Sibi were defeated by Pashtun Panni tribe of Sangan and kut mundai, thus, the Pannis conquered Sibi and Dhadar plains.

Pannis of Sibi and Dhadar, under their chiefs Malik Yahya Mizri and Jangi khan panni, defeated the Mughal forces twice but surrendered the Sibi Fort after a third valiant resistance. Thus, the territory came under Mughal rule. During the rule of Aurangzeb, Junaid khan Barozai, head of Panni (Pashtun tribe) of Sibi, was granted authority over Sibi and the Kachhi area and was titled ‘Bakhtiar Khan;he was succeeded by his son Mirza khan, who was officially declared a Nawab by Aurangzeb and also given administration over Shikarpur, Sindh. Nawab Mirza khan Barozai led the Pannis successfully in initial 16 out of 18 battles fought against Khan of Kalat, of Mir Ahmad Khan, during the 17th engagement at a spot called Pir Lekhan, neither sides emerged victorious, but Mir Ahmad himself, and his Minister, Akhund Mohammad Saleh, were both wounded, and Mir Shawaz and Mir Ibrahim, the latter an ancestor of the Nausherwani Sardar Mir Azad Khan, lost their lives. The Brahuis left the battlefield; the Pannis collected the booty, consisting of silken belts and horses of Turki and Tazi breed. Mir Ahmad Qambrani's sister named Bibo gallantly attacked the Pannis attired in male garments she fought valiantly and got killed at the hands of Jalal Khan Panni.

In 1695, the Khan of Kalat received the intelligence about absence of Mirza Khan from Sibi. He planned a well-thought-out attack on Sibi. Skirting Sibi and Dhadar he reached unnoticed above the Silachi village of Talli, and thus caught Rahim Khan Pirani (commander of Pannis of Sibi) unprepared. The latter, shocked and surprised, faced the Qambranis on the Luni irrigation channel. For lack of infinitive and timely decision on the part of Rahim Khan, Pannis lost the battle. Nawab Mirza Khan learnt about this debacle in Shikarpur. He rushed to Sibi, organized the disheartened Pannis into a fighting contingent and headed for Kalat. The Khan of Kalat gathered his force in the fort of Kalat. After a few skirmishes both sides thought it prudent to negotiate terms. Peace prevailed between the two confederacies, which was sealed by a happy marriage of Princes Mahnaz the daughter of Mir Ahmad Qambrani with Saeed Khan Barozai Panni, brother of Mirza Khan Barozai. It was agreed upon that Brahvis of Kalat would be allowed to graze their flocks in Kachhi plains.

Nawab Mirza khan Barozai was succeeded by his son Nawab Bakhtiar khan (2nd), he fought the famous Mughal-Afghan battle of Uch in January 1702, against the Mughal forces led by Prince Muhammad Muizudin the Subahdar of Multan. Nawab Bakhtiar khan, along with 400-500 Machi (Jamote People), 30 Silachi Tareens and many pannis; was killed. The government over Sibi and Dhadar territory was handed over to Kalhoras of Sindh by the Mughals. During this period Rahim Parang and Doulat Khan Barozai revolted but the insurrection was crushed. Again Rahim, Yusuf and other Afghans revolted and succeeded in recapturing Sibi and Dhadar from Kalhoras on 25.2.1708. Kalhoras once again attacked SIWI and Dhadar and fought a battle with Pannis who were then being led by Sardar Panju Khan Khajjak. In this battle Panju Khan along with many Afghans was killed whereas his colleagues Sabzal Khan and Doulat Khan Barozai sued for peace.Thus Sibi and Dhadar were again, in the month of March and April 1708, restored to Kalhora rule. Pannis lost about 1000 men in the course of the 37 days-long Kalhora-Panni battle for SIWI and Dhadar. Mir Abdul Jalil Bilgrami has recorded this famous and prolonged battle in the form of a poem. All this information has been obtained from Kalhora sources like Manshurul-Wassiat & Guldasta-e-Nouras Bähär.

In 1714 Yar Muhammad Kalhoro with the title of Khuda Yar Khan acquired SIWI and Dhadar from Mughals. He was succeeded by Noor Mohammad Kalhoro also known as Khuda Yar Khan who in 1730 A.D. fought Battle of Kachhi and killed Abdullah Khan Brahvi the then Khan of Kalat somewhere near Lehri village. After Nader Shah's invasion of India, Dhadar and Kachhi (excluding Sibi plains & Sangan) were handed over to the refugee sons of Khan Kalat by Nadir Shah as compensation for the blood of Khan Abdullah Khan. During the rule of the Ahmad Shah Durrani, Panni chief Nawab Ismail Khan Barozai was handed the administration of Sibi and adjoining areas. On the death in 1753 of Mir Nur Mohammad Kalhora, Ahmad Shah Abdali made the Panni Nawab a royal representative in the newly acquired Sind Province. To quell the running dispute between Kalhoras and Daudpotras about the possession of the town of Shikarpur it was also, once again, handed over to the Afghans of Siwi. But unfortunately Panni Afghan forces of Nawwab Ismail Khan indulged in unworthy conduct of plundering the local populace in Sindh. As a result of this differences arose between the Panni Nawwab and Mohammad Beg Shamlu- the royal ambassador in Sindh. This confrontation resulted in Sind province again reverting to the rule of Kalhoras. The town of Shikarpur, however, continued under the rule of the Pannis of Siwi for some more time. The town, as well as the whole areas, benefited from this arrangement greatly because a brisk trade between Sindh and Siwi-Ouetta-Pishin Region on the one hand and Afghanistan and Central Asian cities on the other sprang up. This trade was, after-wards, interrupted partly because of the poor law and order situation in the then southern Afghanistan during the twenty year's rule of Taimur Shah son of Ahmad Shah Abdali which lasted from 1772 to 1793 A.D. In the possession of Nawab Ghous Bakhsh Barozai present dejure head of Siwi Afghans,' there is a sunnud/letter of Ahmed Shah Abdali which is dated 28th Rabiul Awwal 1172 A.H (1758) and reads as recorded below :

" Before this I had, through separate written orders, awarded the government of Sibi territory to Isa Khan Durrani Panni (Nawab Ismail khans son) and the government of the forts of Barah-Kam(Barkhan) and Khetran and Hasni to Mohammad Khan Durrani Panni (Nawab Ismail khans brother). But now I award the government of the above-mentioned Mahals to be held by Umdatul-Khawanin (the best of the Khans) Ismail Khan Durrani Panni, Isa Khan and Mohammad Khan jointly. All the three will perform social, military and revenue functions in respect of these areas jointly and under the overall supervision of Ismail Khan because he is both aged, knowledgeable and experienced of all of them. To Ismail Khan, I entrust the whole range of matters connected with the punishment, patronage and administration of Panni tribe- so that he attends to his duties with care and gives good performance. Isa Khan, Mohammad Khan, zamindars, nobles and general Panni public should keep within the limits prescribed by me. State functionaries should also enforce above mentioned orders" Other important fact which these letters bring to light is that, until the winters of 1758 A.D., Marri tribe had not as yet occupied Kahan and Kohlu areas - both of which tracts were still in the possession of the Hasni and Zarkun Afghans. It is sometime after the winter of 1758 that Khetran, Hasni and Zarkun Afghans were attacked and considerably weakened twice by the forces of Mohammad Khan Panni and then(perhaps after the death of Ahmed Shah Abdali) by the Marri tribe encouraged and practically assisted by Mir Nasir Khan I. A story is still current that an emissary belonging to Sumarani Marri subsection had been sent to the Khan of Kalat to ask for help. When in durbar he killed a dangerous snake and thus earned the good will of the chief. This, among other things, led to Khan furnishing an army for the support of Marris against Hasnis."When Mir Nasir Khan I rebelled against the Shah the news spread like wild-fire. Among other things he instigated Dumar Afghans to attack and plunder the Panni headquarters of Sangan village. For this purpose he tampered with the loyalty of Sardar Haider Khan Dumar regardless of the fact that the latter was one of the most trustworthy friends of the Baruzais. Sardar Haider Khan, one fine morning, appeared before the Sangan fort with a considerable force. At that time Rashid Khan son of Nawwab Ismail Khan Panni happened to be present in the Sangan Fort. He immediately shifted inside, the Afghan nomads, who were camping outside the walls of the fort and ordered the trees, around the Sangan fort to be cut down in order to eliminate the chances of enemy taking shelter behind these trees. Soon after Dumar forces surrounded the Sangan Fort and started firing at the garrison. This continued for quite sometime. Becoming impatient Kahlil Khan shouted at Rashid Khan "why not go out of the fort and fight the enemy in the open". This suggestion was immediately accepted and Pannis rushed out to give battle to Dumar in the open fields. After a severe engagement and lot of massacre Dumars forces broke and ran. It is said that as a result of this battle' Sardar Haider Khan Dumar, having been hit in the leg, became lame and could not walk properly for the rest of his life" Nawab Ismail khan Barozai Panni must have been a famous and popular ruler because the well-known and often quoted saying "Bani to Bani-Nahin to Daud Khan Panni" attributed to Daud Khan Panni of all-India fame is frequently amended by the local Barozais so as to declare that "Bani to Bani-Nahin to Ismail Khan Panni". Nawab Ismail Khan Panni died about 1762 A.D and lies buried in a tomb, still intact, situated about two furlongs southeast of the remote but historic Panni village of Sangan, Pakistan. According to Mulla Fazil, on the death of his father, Isa Khan Panni wrote a letter to Ahmad Shah Abdali informing him of the demise of late Nawab Ismail Khan Panni. Ahmad Shah replied to the letter offering condolences and also conferring the title of Bakhtiar Khan on Isa Khan Panni. Two years after Isa Khan/Bakhtiar Khan (3rd) Panni of Sangan became the ruler of the Confederacy he, in 1764, was summoned by the Shah and, therefore, took out a force to assist him in a fight against Sikhs in Punjab. On page 60/70 of 'Jang Nama' of Qazi Nur Mohammad Kalhora we find a heading as follows :

"WHEN BAKHTIAR KHAN PANNI'S FORCES JOINED THAT OF THE KHAN” According to Qazi's narrative Bakhtiar Khan(the Third) came over and joined Mir Nasir Khan of Kalat at a time when latter's forces were about to cross the Indus River in Dera Ghazi Khan area. As a result of his arrival Khan of Kalat was detained near the ford for some days so that he could organize a reception (feast) on the river bank in the honour of the Khan of Panni Afghans. This family needed no introduction, says Qazi, because they had produced about 13 generations of ruling Khans. The Khan(Nawab) of the Pannis came with a force made up of one thousand brave fighters. After the reception was over both the Brahvi as well as the Afghan forces crossed the Indus River in boats. While marching on the other side of Indus River the two Khans indulged themselves in game-hunting till they reached Sahiwal which is a tract of land enclosed by the Jhelum and the Chenab Rivers- says Qazi. There the Khan of Kalat having received express summonses from Ahmad Shah Abdali left in haste to meet the latter. Around the end of rule of Sadozais and beginning of rule of Barakzais, unity and faith among Panni confederacy of Sibi and Sangan broke apart and bitter civil war started. About 1813 A.D. Ahmad Yar Khan son of Behram Khan, Sarfraz Khan son of Mir Mustafa Khan and Mai Zenab daughter of Mir Nasir Khan I are granted political asylum by Khajjak chief Sardar Meer Khan.Sometime after 1813 A.D. Khajjak Panni Afghan chief named Meer Khan attacks & destroys the village of the Afghan tribe of Marghzanis (Pannis) who consequently migrate to and take refugee with the Panni Afghan tribe of Dehpals. Khajjaks also deprive Marghzanis, of their share of water in the Nari river. However, Meer Khan is himself killed by a matchlock ball during the same fight. Khajjaks also quarrelled with Barozais, Lunis and Naudhani Tareens.

About 1825 A.D. Baruzai chief of Sibi Nawab Habib Khan son of Nawab Ahmed Yar Khan s/o Nawab Mohammad khan Panni, was murdered by Khajjaks after notorious Haji Khan Kakar, then an agent of Mohammadzai Sardars of Kandhar had first been bribed by them. This incident took place during a Darbar held at Kurak village. According to Moulvi Abdul Haleem of Kurk the news of the murder of Habib Khan was carried by one of his Silachi servants to village Talli. As a result, a Silachi (Tarin Afghan) force rushed to the scene of murder where they found and attacked Haji Khan's party. In the ensuing clash Haji received a severe beating whereas several of his party were killed and all their belongings plundered. Approximately between 1825 - 1826 A.D. Habib Khan's brother Saadullah Khan Baruzai also came to be murdered by the Khajjaks at the shrine of famous saint Akhund Sahib (Mulla Mali) of the Safi tribe during the course of afternoon prayers. Immediately before the prayers a tribal jirga had decided that there will no more be bloodshed amongst the Afghan owners of lands and water, as stated by Qazi Abdul Haleem, Khajjaks and some of the Pannis violated the oath on Quran immediately after they had taken it, and murdered the Baruzai Khan.

Habib Khan had three sons Shakar Khan(nominal Chief), Misri khan (defacto Chief), Bakhtiar khan. During this period Khajjak Barozai differences forced Misri Khan Barozai to lead the British forces to Siwi and surround Khajjaks in their village which act eventually, led to a fight Historical consequences of this fight are stated to be quite damaging to the interests of the Afghans of the region because the powerful tribe of the Khajjaks had always acted as a psychological, if not physical, bulwark against the Marri depredations in Sibi and Dhadar plains. Misri Khan, who tendered his services to Shah Shujah Durrani and was taken into British pay. In 1841, as already described in the section on History, the town of Khajjaks was occupied by British troops and dismantled. British-Khajjak battle is reported, on page 638 of Raverty's 'Notes' in the following words:-

"Early in March 1841 Mr. Ross Bell, then Political Agent in Upper Sind called upon the inhabitants of the Siwi district, as well as others, and including the Khajjaks, to pay up the arrears of revenue due by them to their sovereign's treasury(Emirate of Afghanistan), and one of his Assistants was despatched for the purpose of collecting the money, accompanied by small detachment of troops, and Misri Khan, the Barozai, accompanied them. Whether the hostility existing between the Barozais and the Khajjaks and the base treatment of the former by the latter were known to the Political is very doubtful but, of course, the Barozai chief, as might have been expected, was only too glad to have a chance of settling old scores with the ingrate Khajjaks. The upshot was, after the Khajjaks, as it has been said, had been at a first inclined to pay up, they now refused to do so, and being able to muster 700 fighting men they defied the authorities. A force was asked for by the Political Agent to coerce them.At this time, there was a British force of some 6000 men encamped at and around Bhag Nari, but, despising the enemy as usual, a small force of about one tenth of that number, about 600 men in all, including apparently a detachment of horse artillery, was despatched against the Kajzak town, under the command of Colonel Wilson of the bombay Cavalry. The Khajjaks, nothing daunted at the approach of the troops, refused the terms offered them, and an attack was determined upon. The Khajzaks threw open the gate of their walled town, but which walls had fallen down in several places, and defended themselves bravely, cutting down all who attempted to enter. Twice our troops were driven back, and the result was a very serious repulse, and the loss of fifty three men killed and wounded, and four officers, while the defendants lost forty-five men killed, besides three of their headmen, and ninety-three men and three chiefs wounded. The small force thus beaten off had to content itself with closely investing the place, as they imagined, until reinforcements should arrive from Bhag. Now, a European and a Native regiment and a whole troop of horse artillery, were despatched in hot haste, but the elements prevented their speedy arrival and by the time the troops reached the Khajjak town they found that it had been evacuated by its brave defenders, and was then in the possession of the detachment which before had unsuccessfully assaulted it. The defenses of the place wee blown up and demolished, the place itself given up to plunder, and the cultivation around laid waste. Subsequent to this attack upon the Khajjak town, and the strength of that Branch of the Pannis had been broken, the Marri Balochis acquired a footing in the Siwi district, dispossessed the Parni of Bhaderah, Kwat, and Mandahi”

English writer Eastwick had quoted Khajjaks as “the bravest of the people inhabiting the plains (Sibi) “

In Mac Gregor's Gazetteer of the North-west Frontier Province Volume II (1887-1888) page 940 we have following account of the tribe:-

"Khajjak- a tribe of Pathans. They are a large and powerful clan under the leadership of Lashkar Khan and are usually at enmity with Baruzais. They are said to number from 800 to 900 fighting men and own one fort which contains 300 fighting men. Though agriculture is their chief employment and though they are peacefully inclined they are said to have a high character for bravery. Their lands are watered by tributary streams of the Nari.”

The power of the Khajjaks was thus weakened, and shortly afterwards the Marris acquired a footing in the Sibi District. They dispossessed the Pannis of Badra and Quat Mandi. There are several battles such as that of Jangjah (near Nari Gorge) in which they attacked and brutally murdered other Pannis who were unarmed and were busy in clearing the main irrigation canal. This was very unfortunate because it is stated to have happened in violation of a Quranic oath which the Khajjaks had taken earlier at the Safi's Mosque situated near the shrine of Akhund Sahib north of Kurak village. In this battle twenty one Pannis were killed and many more wounded. Tradition says that Misri Khan Barozaionce led a defending force composed of the Panni tribesmen then living in Kurak village, during an attack against that village by another force led by Fateh Khan Behramzai (Khajjak). This battle is stated to have been fought about three miles to the west of the Kurak village near a bridge (on a canal) commonly known as the bridge of the earcasses. In order to cut off the escape route and to take possession of the defenseless village at the time of victory, Fateh Khan Bahramzai had earlier divided his force into two parties. One of it was to lie in ambush at some distance, in a dry irrigation channel, running east of Kurak village. The other party, composed of horsemen, was to attack the opponents from the western side of the village. This battle was fiercely contested for quite some time but, in the end resulted in a defeat for Khajjaks whose commander Fateh Khan was one of the many casualties. Misri Khan himself was fatally wounded in the battle, died three days later and was buried at the Kurak village Graveyard of the Martyrs'. He died between 1855 and 1860 A.D and was succeeded by his Brother Bakhtiar Khan, In the 'Brief Biographical Account of the Leading Sardars' on page 37 we have as follows:-

"Bakhtiar Khan Baruzai, Chief of Sibi. Major Harrison wrote in 1871. His Highness (Khan Kalat) said, he believed, if he was killed Bakhtiar Khan Baruzai of Sibi would be put on the Khanate. Had nephews Akbar Khan, Surbaland Khan and Ismail Khan (sons of Misri Khan, Bakhtiar Khan's elder brother) with whom he was said to have quarrelled. Communicated information to the political authorities after withdrawal of Political Agent from Kalat in 1973. Had a son named Akhtiar Khan who was reported to have been killed early in 1874 in a dispute with the Khajjaks. Bakhtiar Khan too Died in March 1874 and was succeeded by his nephew Mir Sher Zaman (Nawab shakar Khans son), his death attributed by some to grief on the death of his favourite son and by others to the effect of poison”.

Nawab Bakhtiar Khan was succeeded by his nephew Sher Zaman Khan who died in 1876. Nawab Muhammad Khan Barozai - was elected chief of Sibi in the summer of 1876 on the death of his brother Sher Zaman Khan, the only dissentient voice being that of his cousin Sardar Sarbuland Khan who without any right to the chieftainship opposed his election in prosecution of a family dispute. In September 1876 the whole of the Barozai headmen of Sibi' and the Sardar himself wrote to Major Sandeman, asking that the election might be recognized. The petition was referred, through the Kandhar authorities, to the Amir for the orders - Sibi being a dependency of Kabul. Thus three Kabul officials (Pasto Khan, Mir Akber, Sardar Ghulam Muhiue-Din) with the consent of "all the Pannis" presented Nawab Muhammad Khan with a Khillat and dustar of Chiefship sent to him by the Amir Sarbuland Khan. Between 1830 and 1878, for about half a century, Pannis of Sibi (while being at civil war with Khajjaks) resisted successfully the repeated attacks of Marris for capturing the Sibi and Sangan - without any help from the State of Afghanistan of which they were an integral part. History of Sibi of this period is replete with references to the "Marri Aur Khajjak Ka Zulm aur Zore." Translated it means "high-handedness of the Marris and the Khajjaks." Situation in Siwi and Sangan further worsened for Afghans because of the misrule of the then rulers of Afghanistan, the Mohammadzai Sardars, who had ousted Sadozai from the dominant position but were themselves not prepared to do any thing to maintain law and order in the Siwi-Quetta Region.

In 1879, Through Treaty of Gandamak jurisdiction over the Korram and Pishin valleys, the Sibi district, and the Khybar Pass were transferred to the British.

In 1974 the district was subdivided to create Naseerabad and Kohlu districts, in 1983 Dera Bugti District, and in 1986 Ziarat District. Until 2000 and after 2000, Tehsil Harnai of Sibi District became a new District named Harnai District. Sibi District currently comprises two Tehsils, Sibi and Lehri.

== Demography ==
Population

Historical population
Year	Pop.	±%
1951	11,836	—
1961	13,327	+12.6%
1972	19,989	+50.0%
1981	23,043	+15.3%
1998	48,467	+110.3%
2017	64,427	+32.9%
2023	69,300	+7.6%

According to 2023 census, Sibi had a population of 69,300. According to 2017 census, Sibi division had a population of 963,941, which includes 506,028 males and 457,852 females.

Languages

Languages of Sibi (2023 Census)
1. Balochi (40.3%)
2. Sindhi (27.4%)
3. Saraiki (15.0%)
4. Pashto (6.63%)
5. Urdu (4.00%)
6. Punjabi (3.77%)
7. Brahvi (2.73%)
8. Others (0.19%)

At the time of the 2023 census, 40.28% of the population spoke Balochi, 27.4% Sindhi, 15% Saraiki, 6.63% Pashto, 4.0% Urdu, 2.73% Brahui, 3.77% Punjabi and 0.19% Other languages as their first language.

=== Religion ===
Sibi division constitutes 956,124 Muslims, 5,953 Hindus, 1,456 Christians followed by 289 scheduled castes and 119 others.

Religious groups in Sibi City (1941 & 2017)
Religious group	1941		2017	
Religious group	Pop.	%	Pop.	%
Islam	5,505	62.18%	60,528	93.59%
Hinduism	2,814	31.78%	3,506	5.42%
Sikhism	362	4.09%	—N/a	—N/a
Christianity	171	1.93%	640	0.99%
Zoroastrianism	1	0.01%	—N/a	—N/a
Buddhism	1	0.01%	—N/a	—N/a
Total population	8,854	100%	64,674	100%

== Festivals ==
The Sibi Mela festival, first held in January 1885, eventually developed into a significant cultural festival, with a market for Livestock trade, tent pegging, departmental exhibitions, musical shows and sports festivals.

== Establishment ==
The District of Sibi was established in 1903 during British Rule its area was larger than the current district and lay between 27°55' and 30°38'N and 67°17' and 69°50'E lying south of Loralai District, north of the Upper Sind Frontier District, west of Dera Ghazi Khan District and east of Kachhi, Bolan Pass and Quetta- Pishin. The total area of the district was 11,281 square miles (29,220 km2), but this included Marri Bugti county (7,129 square miles) which not directly administered by the British, leaving 4,152 square miles (10,750 km2) that were directly administered by the British [8] The population according to the 1901 census of India was 74,555 or 18 persons per square mile, the district contained four tehsils these were:

Tahsil Area (sq mi) Population

Kohlu 362 1,743

Sibi 1,343 20,526

Shahrig 1,595 16,573

Naseerabad 852 33,713

Total 4,152 74,555

In 1974 the district was subdivided to create Naseerabad and Kohlu districts, in 1983 Dera Bugti District, and in 1986 Ziarat District. Until 2000, except for Naseerabad, these new districts were part of Sibi Division of Pakistan. In 2000 the third-tier "divisions" structure of government was dissolved. Two further new districts were cleaved out of its territory: Harnai in 2007 and Lehri in 2013. Lehri was reannexed into Sibi in 2018.

== Climate ==
Sibi has recorded globally high temperatures, especially in the month of June with an average of 44 °C or 111.2 °F in the afternoon. Rain is light and mainly falls in two distinct periods: early spring in March and April, and during monsoon season in July–September. The climate is hot arid (Köppen BWh).

Climate data for Sibi
Month	Jan	Feb	Mar	Apr	May	Jun	Jul	Aug	Sep	Oct	Nov	Dec	Year
Record high °C (°F)	33.2 (91.8)	33.4 (92.1)	41.1 (106.0)	47.0 (116.6)	53.0 (127.4)	52.0 (125.6)	51.7 (125.1)	48.5 (119.3)	46.1 (115.0)	43.9 (111.0)	40.0 (104.0)	34.0 (93.2)	53.0 (127.4)
Mean daily maximum °C (°F)	22.7 (72.9)	25.0 (77.0)	30.9 (87.6)	37.7 (99.9)	43.5 (110.3)	44.0 (111.2)	42.9 (109.2)	41.1 (106.0)	39.8 (103.6)	37.0 (98.6)	30.5 (86.9)	24.5 (76.1)	35.0 (94.9)
Daily mean °C (°F)	14.1 (57.4)	16.7 (62.1)	22.7 (72.9)	30.1 (86.2)	35.6 (96.1)	38.6 (101.5)	36.3 (97.3)	34.9 (94.8)	32.8 (91.0)	28.0 (82.4)	21.4 (70.5)	15.8 (60.4)	27.2 (81.1)
Mean daily minimum °C (°F)	5.9 (42.6)	8.8 (47.8)	15.0 (59.0)	22.1 (71.8)	27.7 (81.9)	30.8 (87.4)	29.9 (85.8)	29.1 (84.4)	26.2 (79.2)	19.3 (66.7)	12.4 (54.3)	7.0 (44.6)	19.5 (67.1)
Record low °C (°F)	0.0 (32.0)	1.0 (33.8)	3.8 (38.8)	12.2 (54.0)	18.0 (64.4)	23.0 (73.4)	20.6 (69.1)	19.7 (67.5)	15.6 (60.1)	10.0 (50.0)	4.0 (39.2)	−2.3 (27.9)	−2.3 (27.9)
Average rainfall mm (inches)	6.9 (0.27)	19.9 (0.78)	44.7 (1.76)	31.9 (1.26)	19.4 (0.76)	31.0 (1.22)	85.6 (3.37)	60.3 (2.37)	27.7 (1.09)	6.1 (0.24)	11.5 (0.45)	3.3 (0.13)	348.3 (13.7)
Source: NOAA (1971–1990)

== See also ==
- Barozai
- Sibi District
- Mehergarh
- Mizri
- Bibi Nani
- Khajjak
- Dehpal
- Marghazani
- Kurak
- kalwar
- Ocepur railway station

== Bibliography ==
- Syed Abdul Quddus (1990). The Tribal Baluchistan. Ferozsons. p. 49. ISBN 9789690100474.
