= Sangan, Pakistan =

Village in Pakistan

Sangan is a village in Sibi District, Balochistan, Pakistan. In 2011, the population was 2241 in 484 households.

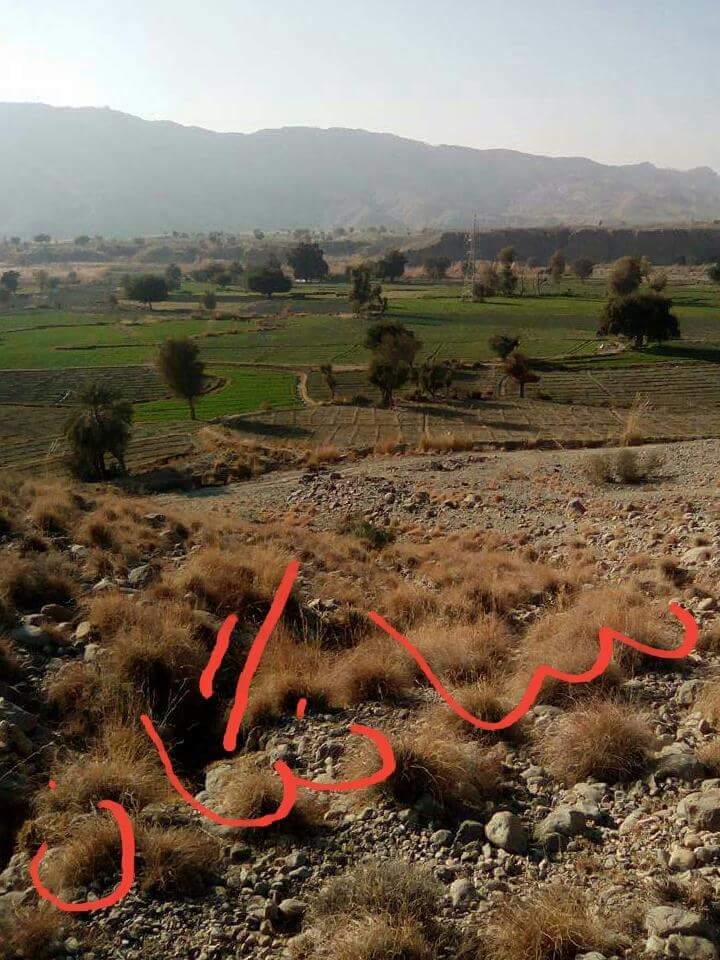
Sangan village Balochistan, Pakistan

The Barozais and Sangachis are major tribes and Zamindars of Sangan jagir.

On 15 March 2022 an IED exploded on a convoy of security forces in Sangan killing four Frontier Corps personnel and seriously injuring six others.
