= Sibi Mela =

Cultural festival

The Sibi Mela is an annual cultural show held in Sibi, in the Balochistan Province of Pakistan. The first Sibi Mela was held in Sibi in January 1885. It has subsequently developed into a cultural festival, with animal markets, camel racing, tent pegging and exhibitions of handicrafts, tribal dresses and folk dances.

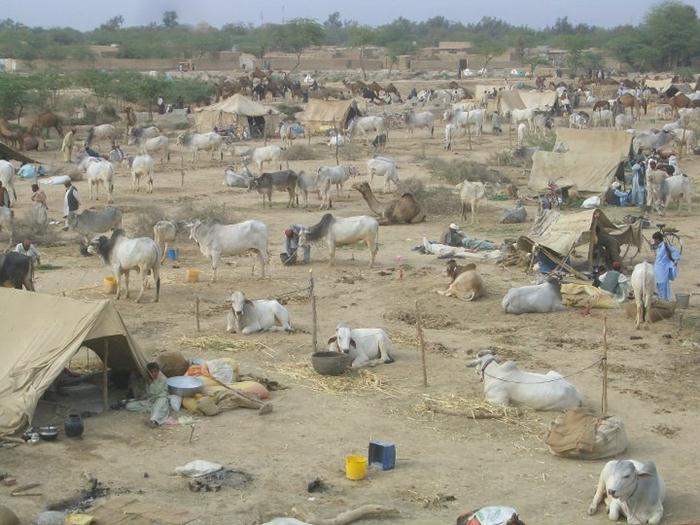
Sibi Mela

The Government of Bombay Revenue Department in their Resolution No. 4794, dated 6 July 1886, declared the results of this second horse show to be very satisfactory and observed that the horse show promised to become in future a good market for remounts.

As a result of the continued success of the fair the Government of India was asked to sanction an annual monetary grant towards the fair’s expenses in future and though no grant could be made for the year under review a provisional sanction to the allotment of Rs 1,000 was given for the fair of 1887.

The 1887 fair began on 19 January and continued until 25 January. Brigadier General Luck C. B. commanding in Sindh was President of the Judging Committee and Mr. Hallen General Superintendent Horse Breeding Operations in India was one of members. The total number of horses brought to the show was estimated to be 1,400, of which no less than 1,022 competed for prizes as against 594 in previous year. The Sibi Mela annually held in the city after the creation of Pakistan. Muhammad Ali Jinnah visited Sibi attended the annual gathering of Sibi Mela 1948 and addressed the tribal Leaders and people.

The annual Sibi Mela 2018 was aimed to celebrate with tradition and culture of the region. The Livestock market held in the ground, exhibition of departmental stalls and musical show presented during the Mela.

== Prominent breeds shown ==
- Sibi Bhagnari
