= Khajjak =

Coordinates: 29°36′N 67°59′E

The Khajjak is a village at a 8 kilometers distance from Sibi city of Balochistan, Pakistan. The whole of the Khajjak town is very rich particularly in wheat. The Khajjak tribe hold the means of irrigation by the Nari completely in their hands and their crops extent of cultivation were unequaled in any part of Kachhi District.

== Anglo Khajjak Battle 1841 ==
The Khajjak Town is situated 8 Kilometers distance from Sibi city Balochistan province of Pakistan . This tract is generally uncultivated till within about 4 miles South of Kurak, thence as far North as the hills the area is very productive. The whole of the Khajjak circle of which the Fort of that name is the capital is very rich particularly in wheat. The Khajjak Tribe as before stated held the means of irrigation by the Nari completely in their hands and crops extent of cultivation were unequaled in any part of Kachhi District.

The Khajjak Fort is described as strong and surrounded by a deep dry ditch through which the troops advanced to a gateway, within which was the gate attacked. This was lined with 800 to 900 Khajjaks and was therefore a strong position. It was opposite this gate that captain Leslie opened fire to cover the advance of the infantry and it was endeavoring to force this that Lieutenant Falconer at the head of the grenadiers was killed with five or six of his men. Lieutenant Shaw again attempting it was severely wounded.

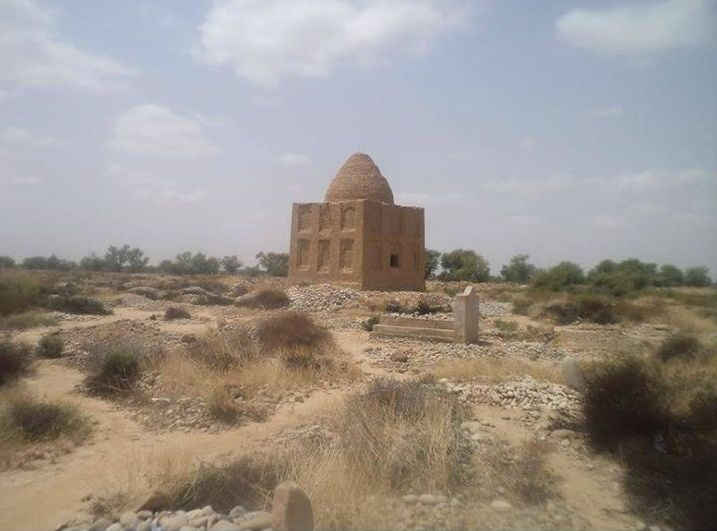
Sardar Panju Khan Khajjak Tomb

In January 1841 Brigadier Valiant's brigade consisting of two troops Horse Artillery, a nine pounder Field Battery two wings of Cavalry the 40th Regiment, a wing of the 41st Regiment, two battalions of Bombay native Infantry, the 20th and 21st and a mass of irregular horse, marched from Sakkar (Where it had arrived from Karachi in December 1840) and proceeded to mengal-ka-Shahir near Bhag. Where it remained for some time in camp. Whilst there a small force with guns was sent to Khajjaks in the Sibi country about 30 miles North-east of Dhadar, under Colonel Wilson of the Bombay Cavalry to coerce the Khajjaks of that place, but met with a disaster, two officers being killed and Colonel Wilson himself mortally wounded. The cause of this disaster was that the detachment was marched into the body of the town without taking possession of the houses right and left. The Khajjaks waited till they had come in and then poured in a fire from under cover. A second attempt by dismounted Artillerymen under Lieutenant Creed was defeated owing to the want of support and Lieutenant Creed himself was among the slain. The place was subsequently occupied and destroyed by the Brigadier. The British Troops lost 4 officers including 55 men of the army and 90 people of Khajjak Tribes are martyred. The Khajjaks are the descendants of a kakar tribe.

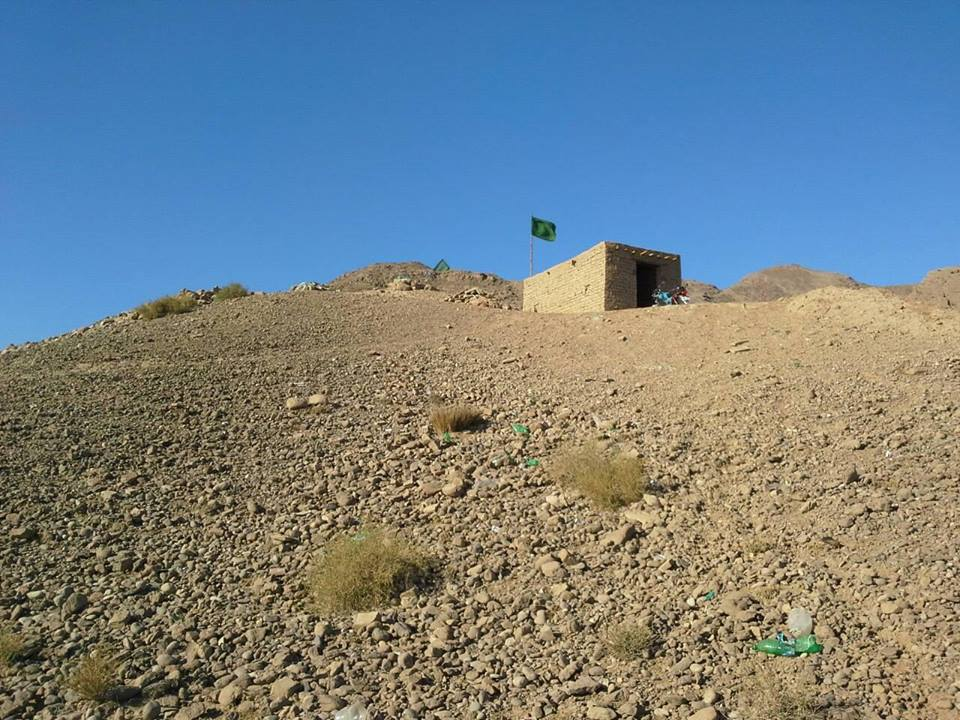
Shaheedan Khajjak 1841

The Khajjak who resided with nine other Kakar chiefs in a village Mekhtar Loralai District in consequence of a feud in which Khajjaks with their family and dependents migrated to Sibi. The names of the Khajjak chiefs, the descendants of sons of khajjak are, 1-Ismail Khan son of Panjo Khan( The head chief Panjo being the eldest son.) 2- Issa Khan son of Ali Khan 3-Syud Khan son of Dur Khan 4-Karim Khan son of Taj Muhammad 5-Hassan khan son of Mir Khan 6- Meeran Khan son of Jan Muhammad 7- Dur Khan son of Naseer Khan 8- Kamal Khan son of Akbar Khan The Khajjak Tribe is said to have numbered from seven hundred to one thousand fighting men this year.

== See also ==
- Sibi District
- Mehergarh
- Sevi
- Bibi Nani
- Dehpal
- Marghazani
- Kurak
- Sibi Mela
