= Marghazani =

Village in Pakistan

== Marghazani ==
Marghazani is a village at a 2 kilometers distance from Sibi city of Balochistan, Pakistan.

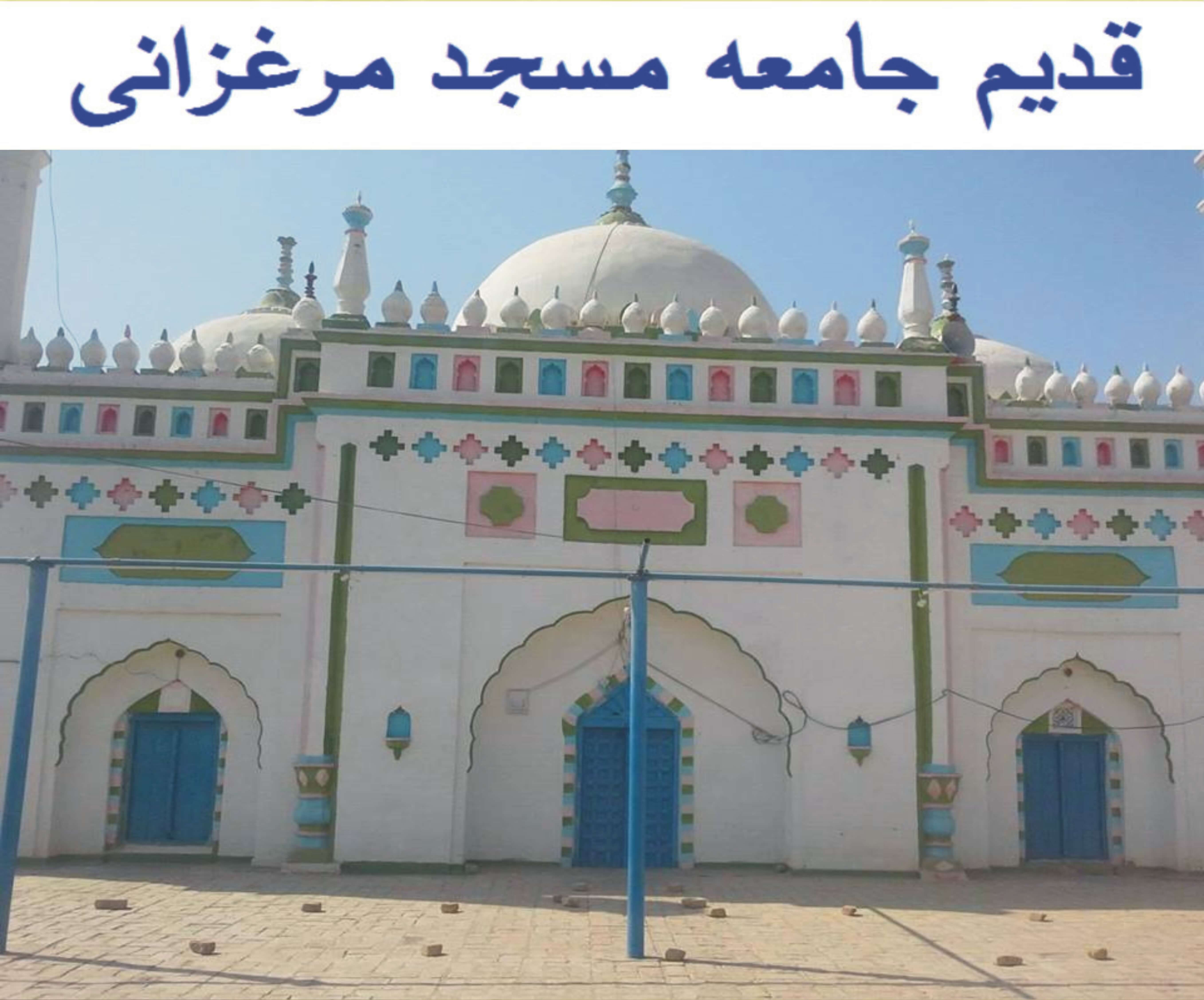
Marghazani Masjid

== See also ==
- Sibi District
- Mehergarh
- Sevi
- Bibi Nani
- khajjak
- Kurak
- Talli
