= Panni (Pashtun tribe) =

Pashtun tribal group

Panni (Pashto: پاني) or Parni or Pannizai refers to a Pashtun tribe in Afghanistan and Pakistan. It belongs to the Ghurghusti confederation, where Ghurghust is traditionally believed to be one of three sons of the mythical progenitor of Pashtuns, Qais-Abdr-Rasheed.

== Etymology ==
They traditionally claim descent from Panni, son of Dani who was one of the three sons of Ghurghusht. According to traditional Pashtun genealogies such as the Makhzan-i-Afghani (c.1612), Panni had eighteen sons, many of who gave descent to their own tribes.

== Clans and Branches ==
According to Bernard Dornhe's transation of the Makhzan-i-Afghani, in no particular order, they are divided into the following principle clans: Safi, Jadoon (Zhadoon), Esote, MusaKhel, AliKhel, Umarzai, Lawn, Shawn, Dahpal, Murghzani, Khatani and Khabati.

== Geography ==
Today they primarily inhabit the Sulaiman mountains in Northern Balochistan, with settlements in parts of Afghanistan as well.

== History ==
A number of Panni Pashtuns migrated from their homeland in the Koh-i-Suleiman and Balochistan to the Lodi Sultanate of Afghan king Bahlul Lodi.

During the time of Sultan Sher Shah Suri, the powerful Rohtas Fort of Bihar was garrisoned by 10,000 matchlock men with command entrusted on Ikhtiyar Khan Panni, one of the Amirs of the Sultan.

The head of the eastern Afghan confederacy, Sultan Daud Karrani is known to have had Panni generals, who were Jahan Khan Panni and Jamal Khan Panni.

== Notable people ==
- Daud Khan Panni, a general of Emperor Aurangzeb
