= Bibi Nani =

Area in Balochistan, Pakistan

Coordinates: 29°42′N 67°23′E

Bibi Nani is an area in the road between the towns of Quetta and Sibi, in Balochistan, Pakistan, and is located at 29°41'60N 67°22'60E. The area name is most probably derived from a Sufi figure that was buried in its suburbs and is also the location of a Hindu shrine.

The location is a major site for power connections that link areas of Balochistan with the water sources from the Sindh rivers.

The area came into the news in January 2005 when a rocket attack took place on a checkpoint for the Pakistani army there. Reportedly, it was most probably carried out by Taliban fighters.
