= Mehrgarh =

Neolithic archaeological site in Balochistan, Pakistan

- Mehrgahr, Merhgarh, Merhgahr
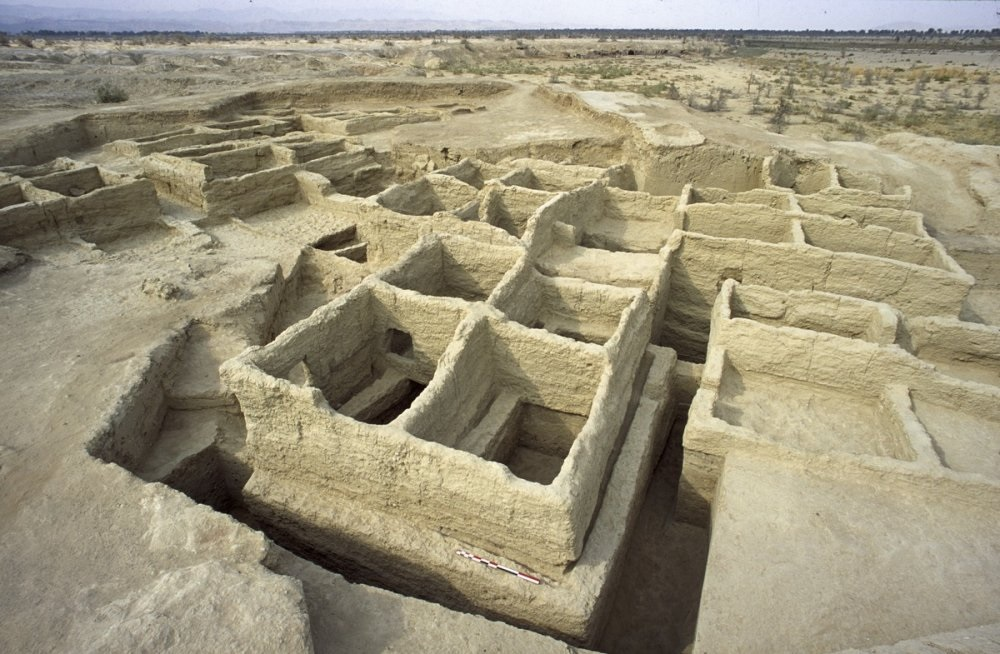
- Ruins of houses at Mehrgarh, Balochistan

- Location within the Pakistani province of Balochistan Location within Pakistan Mehrgahr (South Asia)
- 29°23′N 67°37′E
- Type: Settlement
- Periods: Neolithic-Chalcolithic
- Location: Balochistan, Pakistan
- Region: South Asia

History
- Built: c. 5200 BCE
- Abandoned: c. 2600 BCE

Site notes
- Excavation dates: 1974–1986, 1997–2000
- Archaeologists: Jean-François Jarrige; Catherine Jarrige
- Discovered: 1974

Mehrgarh is a Neolithic and Chalcolithic archaeological site situated on the Kacchi Plain of Balochistan in Pakistan. It is located near the Bolan Pass, to the west of the Indus River and between the modern-day Pakistani cities of Quetta, Kalat and Sibi. The site was discovered in 1974 by the French Archaeological Mission in the Indus Basin led by the French archaeologists Jean-François Jarrige and Catherine Jarrige. Mehrgarh was excavated continuously between 1974 and 1986, and again from 1997 to 2000. Archaeological material has been found in six mounds, and about 32,000 artefacts have been collected from the site. The earliest settlement at Mehrgarh, located in the northeast corner of the 495-acre (2.00 km^{2}) site, was a small farming village dated from 7000 BCE or 5250 BCE (see below).

== History ==
Mehrgarh is one of the earliest known sites in the South Asia showing evidence of farming and herding. (Note: Excavations at Bhirrana, Haryana, in India between 2006 and 2009, by archaeologist K. N. Dikshit, provided six artefacts, including "relatively advanced pottery," so-called Hakra ware, which were dated at a time bracket between 7380 and 6201 BCE. These dates compete with Mehrgarh for being the oldest site for cultural remains in the area. Yet, Dikshit and Mani clarify that this time-bracket concerns only charcoal samples, which were radio-carbon dated at respectively 7570–7180 BCE (sample 2481) and 6689–6201 BCE (sample 2333). Dikshit further writes that the earliest phase concerns 14 shallow dwelling-pits which "could accommodate about 3–4 people." According to Dikshit, in the lowest level of these pits wheel-made Hakra Ware was found which was "not well finished," together with other wares.) It was influenced by the Neolithic culture of the Near East, with similarities between "domesticated wheat varieties, early phases of farming, pottery, other archaeological artefacts, some domesticated plants and herd animals." (Note: According to Gangal et al. (2014), there is strong archeological and geographical evidence that neolithic farming spread from the Near East into north-west India. Gangal et al. (2014): "There are several lines of evidence that support the idea of a connection between the Neolithic in the Near East and the Indian subcontinent. The prehistoric site of Mehrgarh in Baluchistan (modern Pakistan) is the earliest Neolithic site in the northwest of the Indian subcontinent, dated as early as 8500 BCE.[18] Neolithic domesticated crops in Mehrgarh include more than 90% barley and a small amount of wheat. There is good evidence for the local domestication of barley and the zebu cattle at Mehrgarh [19], [20], but the wheat varieties are suggested to be of Near-Eastern origin, as the modern distribution of wild varieties of wheat is limited to Northern Levant and Southern Turkey [21]. A detailed satellite map study of a few archaeological sites in the Baluchistan and Khyber Pakhtunkhwa regions also suggests similarities in early phases of farming with sites in Western Asia [22]. Pottery prepared by sequential slab construction, circular fire pits filled with burnt pebbles, and large granaries are common to both Mehrgarh and many Mesopotamian sites [23]. The postures of the skeletal remains in graves at Mehrgarh bear strong resemblance to those at Ali Kosh in the Zagros Mountains of southern Iran [19]. Clay figurines found in Mehrgarh resemble those discovered at Teppe Zagheh on the Qazvin plain south of the Elburz range in Iran (the 7th millennium BCE) and Jeitun in Turkmenistan (the 6th millennium BCE) [24]. Strong arguments have been made for the Near-Eastern origin of some domesticated plants and herd animals at Jeitun in Turkmenistan (pp. 225–227 in [25]). The Near East is separated from the Indus Valley by the arid plateaus, ridges, and deserts of Iran and Afghanistan, where rainfall agriculture is possible only in the foothills and cul-de-sac valleys [26]. Nevertheless, this area was not an insurmountable obstacle for the dispersal of the Neolithic. The route south of the Caspian sea is a part of the Silk Road, some sections of which were in use from at least 3,000 BCE, connecting Badakhshan (north-eastern Afghanistan and south-eastern Tajikistan) with Western Asia, Egypt, and India [27]. Similarly, the section from Badakhshan to the Mesopotamian plains (the Great Khorasan Road) was apparently functioning by 4,000 BCE, and numerous prehistoric sites are located along with it, whose assemblages are dominated by the Cheshmeh-Ali (Tehran Plain) ceramic technology, forms and designs [26]. Striking similarities in figurines and pottery styles, and mud-brick shapes, between widely separated early Neolithic sites in the Zagros Mountains of north-western Iran (Jarmo and Sarab), the Deh Luran Plain in southwestern Iran (Tappeh Ali Kosh and Chogha Sefid), Susiana (Chogha Bonus and Chogha Mish), the Iranian Central Plateau (Tappeh-Sang-e Chakhmaq), and Turkmenistan (Jeitun) suggest a common incipient culture [28]. The Neolithic dispersal across South Asia plausibly involved migration of the population ([29] and [25], pp. 231–233). This possibility is also supported by Y-chromosome and mtDNA analyses [30], [31].") According to Asko Parpola, the culture migrated into the Indus Valley and became the Indus Valley Civilisation of the Bronze Age.

Jean-Francois Jarrige argues for an independent origin of Mehrgarh. Jarrige notes "the assumption that farming economy was introduced full-fledged from Near-East to South Asia," and the similarities between Neolithic sites from eastern Mesopotamia and the western Indus Valley, which are evidence of a "cultural continuum" between those sites. However, given the originality of Mehrgarh, Jarrige concludes that Mehrgarh has an earlier local background," and is not a "'backwater' of the Neolithic culture of the Near East."

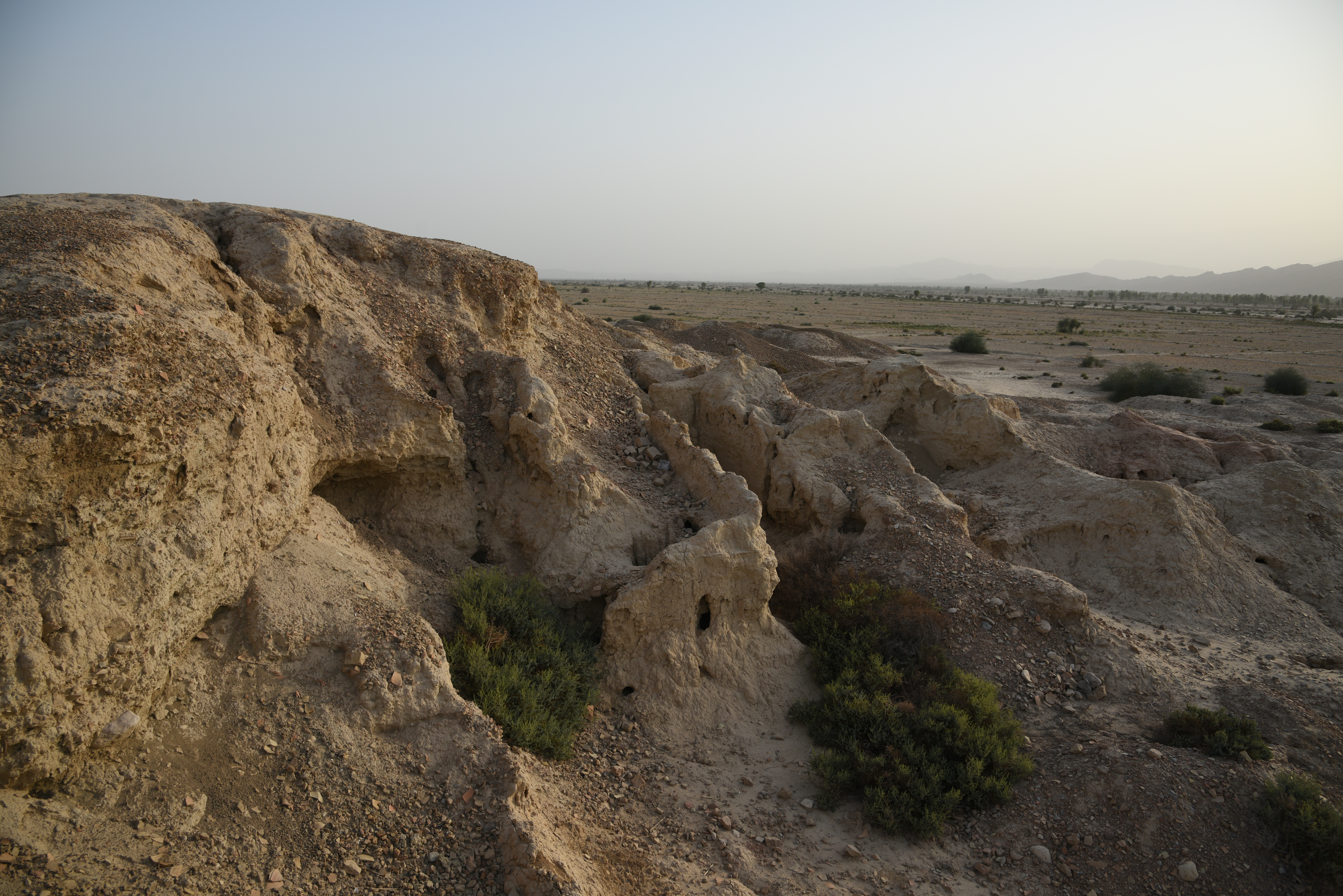
Site location of Mehrgarh

Lukacs and Hemphill suggest an initial local development of Mehrgarh, with continuity in cultural development but a population change. According to Lukacs and Hemphill, while there is a strong continuity between the Neolithic and Chalcolithic cultures of Mehrgarh, dental evidence shows that the Chalcolithic population did not descend from the Neolithic population of Mehrgarh, which "suggests moderate levels of gene flow." They wrote that "the direct lineal descendants of the Neolithic inhabitants of Mehrgarh are to be found to the south and the east of Mehrgarh, in northwestern India and the western edge of the Deccan Plateau," with Neolithic Mehrgarh showing greater affinity with Chalcolithic Inamgaon, south of Mehrgarh, than with Chalcolithic Mehrgarh. (Note: Genetic research shows a complex pattern of human migrations. Kivisild et al. (1999) note that "a small fraction of the West Eurasian mtDNA lineages found in Indian populations can be ascribed to a relatively recent admixture." at c. 9,300 ± 3,000 years before present, which coincides with "the arrival to India of cereals domesticated in the Fertile Crescent" and "lends credence to the suggested linguistic connection between the Elamite and Dravidic populations." Singh et al. (2016) investigated the distribution of J2a-M410 and J2b-M102 in South Asia, which "suggested a complex scenario that cannot be explained by a single wave of agricultural expansion from Near East to South Asia," but also notes that "regardless of the complexity of dispersal, NW region appears to be the corridor for entry of these haplogroups into India.")

Gallego Romero et al. (2011) state that their research on lactose tolerance in India suggests that "the west Eurasian genetic contribution identified by Reich et al. (2009) principally reflects gene flow from Iran and the Middle East." Gallego Romero notes that Indians who are lactose-tolerant show a genetic pattern regarding this tolerance which is "characteristic of the common European mutation." According to Romero, this suggests that "the most common lactose tolerance mutation made a two-way migration out of the Middle East less than 10,000 years ago. While the mutation spread across Europe, another explorer must have brought the mutation eastward to India – likely traveling along the coast of the Persian Gulf where other pockets of the same mutation have been found." They further note that "[t]he earliest evidence of cattle herding in south Asia comes from the Indus River Valley site of Mehrgarh and is dated to 7,000 YBP." (Note: Gallego Romero et al. (2011) refer to (Meadow 1993): Meadow RH. 1993. Animal domestication in the Middle East: a revised view from the eastern margin. In: Possehl G, editor. Harappan civilization. New Delhi (India): Oxford University Press and India Book House. p 295–320.)

== Periods of occupation ==
Archaeologists divide the occupation at the site into eight periods.

=== Mehrgarh Period I (5250-4650 BCE) ===
Recent radiocarbon dating on teeth done by Mutin and Zazzo has placed the dating of Mehrgarh Period I between 5250 and 4650 BCE, differently from Jarrige's earlier dating pre-7000–5500 BCE. (Note: Jarrige: "Though it is difficult to date precisely the beginning of Period I, it can be rather securely assessed that the first occupation of Mehrgarh has to be put in a context probably earlier than 7000 BC.") It was Neolithic and aceramic (without the use of pottery). The earliest farming in the area was developed by semi-nomadic people using plants such as wheat and barley and animals such as sheep, goats and cattle. The settlement was established with unbaked mud-brick buildings and most of them had four internal subdivisions. Numerous burials have been found, many with elaborate goods such as baskets, stone and bone tools, beads, bangles, pendants, and occasionally animal sacrifices, with more goods left with burials of males. Ornaments of sea shell, limestone, turquoise, lapis lazuli and sandstone have been found, along with simple figurines of women and animals. Seashells from far seashores, and lapis lazuli from as far away as present-day Badakshan, show good contact with those areas. One ground stone axe was discovered in a burial, and several more were obtained from the surface. These ground stone axes are the earliest to come from a stratified context in South Asia.

Periods I, II, and III are considered contemporaneous with another site called Kili Gul Mohammad. The aceramic Neolithic phase in the region had originally been called the Kili Gul Muhammad phase.

In 2001, archaeologists studying the remains of nine men from Mehrgarh discovered that the people of this civilization knew proto-dentistry. In April 2006, it was announced in the scientific journal Nature that the oldest (and first early Neolithic) evidence for the drilling of human teeth in vivo (i.e. in a living person) was found in Mehrgarh. According to the authors, their discoveries point to a tradition of proto-dentistry in the early farming cultures of that region. "Here we describe eleven drilled molar crowns from nine adults discovered in a Neolithic graveyard in Pakistan that dates from 7,500 to 9,000 years ago. These findings provide evidence for a long tradition of a type of proto-dentistry in early farming culture."

=== Mehrgarh Period II (4650–4000 BCE) and Period III (4000–3500 BCE) ===
During Period IIA, pottery vessels appeared representing the earliest known pottery from Pakistan.

Mehrgarh III levels begin in the 4th millennium BCE.

The Mehrgarh Period II was ceramic Neolithic, and Mehrgarh Period III was Chalcolithic. Period II is attested at site MR4 and Period III is at MR2. Much evidence of manufacturing activity has been found and more advanced techniques were used. Glazed faience beads were produced and terracotta figurines became more detailed. Figurines of females were decorated with paint and had diverse hairstyles and ornaments. Two flexed burials were found in Period II with a red ochre cover on the body. The number of burial goods decreased over time, becoming limited to ornaments and with more goods left with burials of females. The first button seals were produced from terracotta and bone and had geometric designs. Technologies included stone and copper drills, updraft kilns, large pit kilns, and copper melting crucibles. There is further evidence of long-distance trade in Period II: important as an indication of this is the discovery of several beads of lapis lazuli, once again from Badakshan. Mehrgarh Periods II and III are also contemporaneous with an expansion of the settled populations of the borderlands at the western edge of South Asia, including the establishment of settlements like Rana Ghundai, Sheri Khan Tarakai, Sarai Kala, Jalilpur, and Ghaligai.

Period III was not much explored, but it was found that Togau phase (c. 4000–3500 BCE) was part of this level, covering around 100 hectares in the areas MR.2, MR.4, MR.5 and MR.6, encompassing ruins, burial and dumping grounds, but archaeologist Jean-François Jarrige concluded that "such wide extension was not due to contemporaneous occupation, but rather due to the shift and partial superimposition in time of several villages or settlement clusters across a span of several centuries."

==== Togau phase ====
Pre-Harappan Togau phase - main sites (triangles)

At the beginning of Mehrgarh III, Togau ceramics appeared at the site. Togau ware was first defined by Beatrice de Cardi in 1948. Togau is a large mound in the Chhappar Valley of Sarawan, 12 kilometres northwest of Kalat in Balochistan. This type of pottery is found widely in Balochistan and eastern Afghanistan, at sites such as Mundigak, Sheri Khan Tarakai, and Periano Ghundai.

Anjira is a contemporary ancient site near Togau.

Gregory Possehl (1999) analyzed the regional settlement patterns of the Togau Phase (dating c. 4300–3800 BCE in his view) across Balochistan, Kandahar, and Pakistan Northwest Frontier. According to him, it is attested at 84 sites in the region.

Decoration of Togau ware found at Mehrgarh; four historical stages of development.

Togau ceramics are decorated with animal designs. They were made with potter's wheel from the start. The earliest Togau Phase A ceramics feature detailed and realistic outlines of ibexes, goats or birds. But later stages feature more abstract depictions. The last Togau D Phase has completely abstract geometric line or wavy motif designs.

According to Beatrice de Cardi, Togau A style was found in Mehrgarh III, Togau B-C were found in Mehrgarh IV, and Togau D style was found in Mehrgah V.

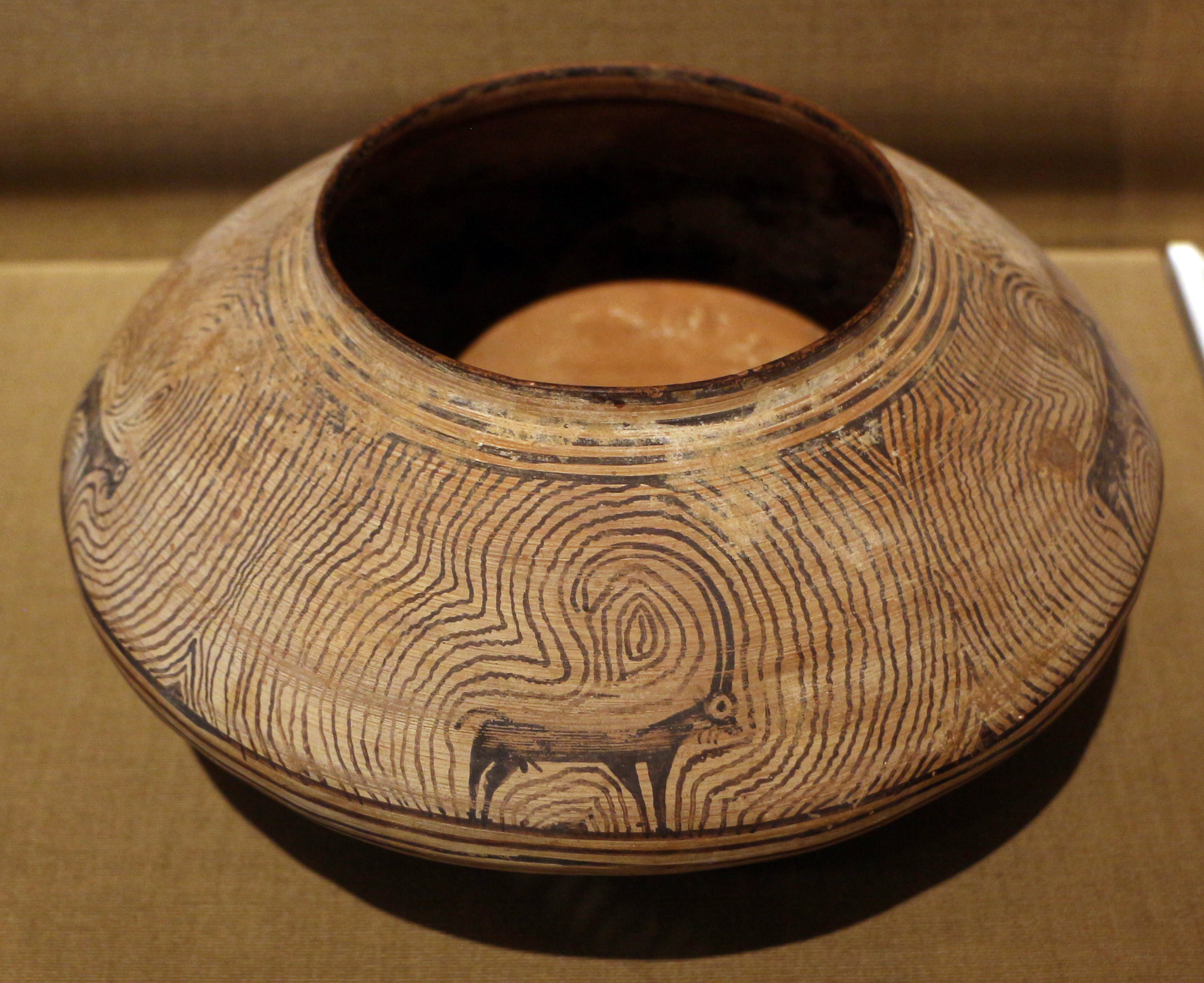
Jar with four ibexes, possibly from Pakistan's Quetta valley, 2800–2500 BC

The time of Mehrgarh Period III and beyond is characterized by important new developments. During the second half of the 4th millennium BCE there is a big increase in the number of settlements in the Quetta Valley, the Surab Region, the Kachhi Plain and elsewhere in the area. Kili Ghul Mohammad (II−III) pottery is similar to Togau Ware.

=== Mehrgarh Periods IV, V and VI (3500–3000 BCE) ===
Period IV was 3500–3250 BCE, Period V from 3250–3000 BCE, and Period VI was around 3000 BCE. The site containing Periods IV to VII is designated as MR1.

=== Mehrgarh Period VII (2600–2000 BCE) ===
Sometime between 2600 BCE and 2000 BCE, the city seems to have been largely abandoned in favour of the larger fortified town Nausharo five miles away, when the Indus Valley Civilisation was in its middle stages of development. Historian Michael Wood suggests this took place around 2500 BCE.

Archaeologist Massimo Vidale considers a series of semi-columns found in a structure at Mehrgarh, dated around 2500 BCE by the French mission there, to be very similar to semi-columns found in Period IV at Shahr-e Sukhteh.

=== Mehrgarh Period VIII ===
The last period is found at the Sibri cemetery, about 8 kilometres from Mehrgarh.

== Lifestyle and technology ==
Early Mehrgarh residents lived in mud brick houses, stored their grain in granaries, fashioned tools with local copper ore, and lined their large basket containers with bitumen. They cultivated six-row barley, einkorn and emmer wheat, jujubes and dates, and herded sheep, goats and cattle. Residents of the later period (5500 BCE to 2600 BCE) put much effort into crafts, including flint knapping, tanning, bead production, and metal working. Mehrgarh is probably the earliest known centre of agriculture in South Asia.

The oldest known example of the lost-wax technique comes from a 6,000-year-old wheel-shaped copper amulet found at Mehrgarh. The amulet was made from unalloyed copper, an unusual innovation that was later abandoned.

== Artifacts ==
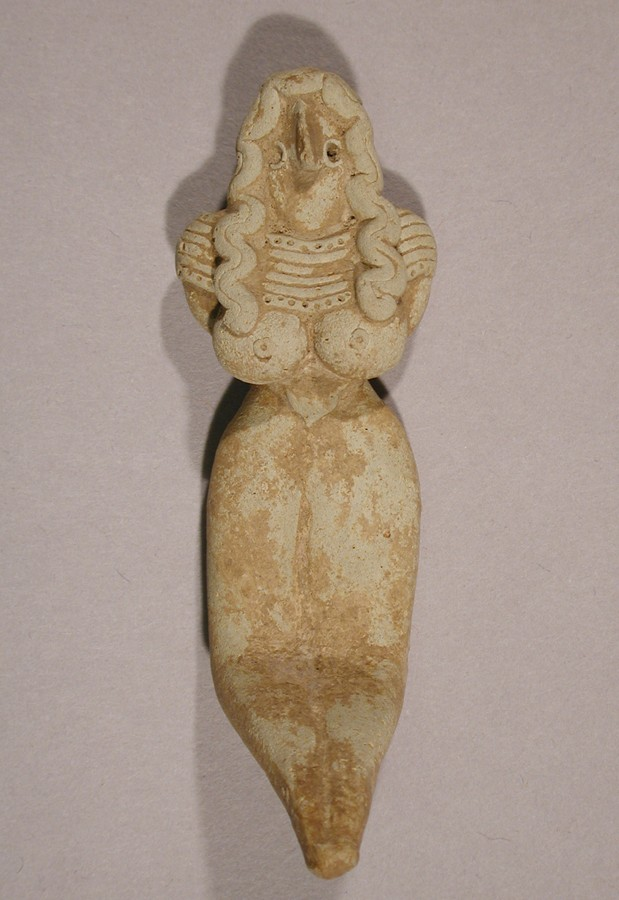
Seated Mother Goddess, 3000–2500 BCE. Mehrgarh

=== Human figurines ===
The oldest ceramic figurines in South Asia were also found at Mehrgarh. They occur in all phases of the settlement and were prevalent even before pottery appears. The earliest figurines are quite simple and do not show intricate features. However, they grow in sophistication with time, and by 4000 BCE begin to show their characteristic hairstyles and typical prominent breasts. All the figurines up to this period were female. Male figurines appear only from period VII and gradually become more numerous. Many of the female figurines are holding babies, and were interpreted as depictions of a mother goddess. However, due to some difficulties in conclusively identifying these figurines with a mother goddess, some scholars prefer using the term "female figurines with likely cultic significance".

=== Pottery ===
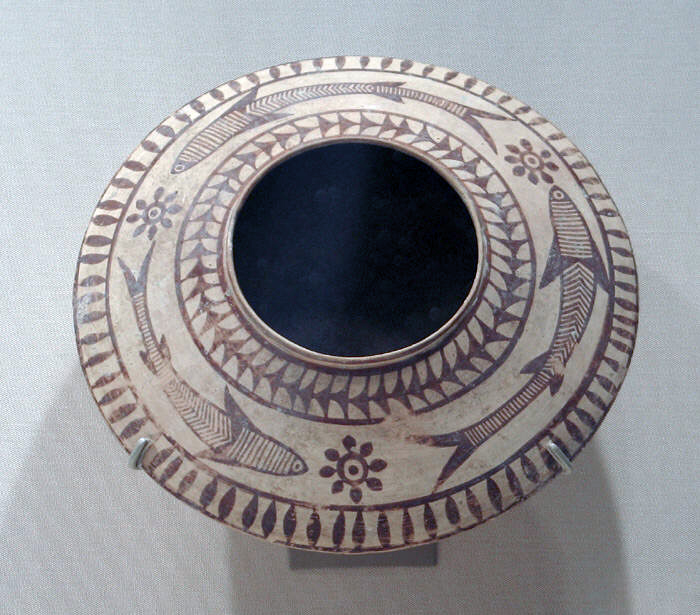
Mehrgarh painted pottery, 3000–2500 BCE

Evidence of pottery begins from Period II. In Period III, the finds become much more abundant as the potter's wheel is introduced, and they show more intricate designs and also animal motifs. The characteristic female figurines appear beginning in Period IV and the finds show more intricate designs and sophistication. Pipal leaf designs are used in decoration from Period VI. Some sophisticated firing techniques were used from Periods VI and VII and an area reserved for the pottery industry has been found at mound MR1. However, by Period VIII, the quality and intricacy of designs seem to have suffered due to mass production, and a growing interest in bronze and copper vessels.

=== Burials ===
There are two types of burials in the Mehrgarh site. There were individual burials where a single individual was enclosed in narrow mud walls and collective burials with thin mud-brick walls within which skeletons of six different individuals were discovered. The bodies in the collective burials were kept in a flexed position and were laid east to west. Child bones were found in large jars or urn burials (4000–3300 BCE).

=== Metallurgy ===
Metal findings have been dated as early as Period IIB, with a few copper items.

== See also ==
- Indus Valley Civilisation and the list of Indus Valley Civilisation sites
- List of inventions and discoveries of the Indus Valley Civilisation
- Sanitation of the Indus Valley Civilisation
- Bhirrana
- Mundigak – archaeological site in Kandahar Province
- Amri-Nal culture – archaeological site in Pakistan
- Shahr-e Sukhteh – archaeological in Iran
- Kulli culture – archaeological site in Baluchistan
- Sheri Khan Tarakai – archaeological site in Bannu
- Mohenjo-daro – archaeological site in Sindh
- Harappa – archaeological site in Punjab
- Bolan Pass
- Nausharo
- Chanhudaro
- Quetta
- List of Stone Age art

== Sources ==
- Coningham, Robin; Young, Ruth (2015), The Archaeology of South Asia: From the Indus to Asoka, c.6500 BCE–200 CE, Cambridge University Press
- Dikshit, K.N. (2013), "Origin of Early Harappan Cultures in the Sarasvati Valley: Recent Archaeological Evidence and Radiometric Dates" (PDF), Journal of Indian Ocean Archaeology (9), archived from the original (PDF) on 18 January 2017
- Gallego Romero, Irene; et al. (2011). "Herders of Indian and European Cattle Share their Predominant Allele for Lactase Persistence". Mol. Biol. Evol. 29 (1): 249–260. doi:10.1093/molbev/msr190. PMID 21836184.
- Gangal, Kavita; Sarson, Graeme R.; Shukurov, Anvar (2014), "The Near-Eastern Roots of the Neolithic in South Asia", PLOS ONE, 9 (5) e95714, Bibcode:2014PLoSO...995714G, doi:10.1371/journal.pone.0095714, PMC 4012948, PMID 24806472
- Kivisild; et al. (1999), "Deep common ancestry of Indian and western-Eurasian mitochondrial DNA lineages", Curr. Biol., 9 (22): 1331–1334, Bibcode:1999CBio....9.1331K, doi:10.1016/s0960-9822(00)80057-3, PMID 10574762, S2CID 2821966
- Mani, B.R. (2008), "Kashmir Neolithic and Early Harappan: A Linkage" (PDF), Pragdhara 18, 229–247 (2008), archived from the original (PDF) on 18 January 2017
- Parpola, Asko (15 July 2015). The Roots of Hinduism: The Early Aryans and the Indus Civilization. Oxford University Press. ISBN 978-0-19-022693-0.
- Singh, Sakshi (2016), "Dissecting the influence of Neolithic demic diffusion on Indian Y-chromosome pool through J2-M172 haplogroup", Sci. Rep., 6 19157, Bibcode:2016NatSR...619157S, doi:10.1038/srep19157, PMC 4709632, PMID 26754573
