= List of cattle breeds =

Over 1000 breeds of cattle are recognized worldwide, some of which adapted to the local climate, while others were bred by humans for specialized uses.

Cattle breeds fall into two main types, which are regarded as either two closely related species, or two subspecies of one species. Bos indicus (or Bos taurus indicus) cattle, commonly called zebu, are adapted to hot climates and originated in the tropical parts of the world such as India, Sub-saharan Africa, China, and Southeast Asia. Bos taurus (or Bos taurus taurus), typically referred to as "taurine" cattle, are generally adapted to cooler climates and include almost all cattle breeds originating from Europe and northern Asia.

== A ==
Breed	Image	Subspecies	Country/region of origin	Meat	Dairy	Draught	Other
Aberdeen Angus		taurus	Scotland	meat	dairy		
Abergele		indicus	Ethiopia	meat	dairy	draught	
Abigar		taurus	Ethiopia		dairy		
Abondance		taurus	France	meat	dairy		
Abyssinian Shorthorned Zebu		indicus	Ethiopia			draught	
Aceh		indicus	Indonesia	meat			
Achham		indicus	Nepal		dairy		
Adamawa		taurus	Nigeria	meat	dairy	draught	
Adaptaur		taurindicine	Australia	meat			
Afar		indicus	Ethiopia	meat	dairy		
Africangus		taurindicine	South Africa	meat			
Afrikaner		indicus	South Africa	meat			
Agerolese		taurus	Italy		dairy		
Alambadi		indicus	India				
Alatau		taurus	Kazakhstan	meat	dairy		
Albanian		taurus	Albania		dairy	draught	
Albera	Albera cattle grazing	taurus	Spain, France	meat			Semi-feral
Alderney		taurus	Channel Islands		dairy		
Alentejana		taurus	Portugal	meat		draught	
Aleutian wild cattle		taurus	United States				Feral
Aliad Dinka		taurindicine	South Sudan		dairy		Cultural/cerimonial
Alistana-Sanabresa		taurus	Spain	meat			Historically triple-purpose, endangered
Allmogekor		taurus	Sweden	meat		draught	
Alur		taurindicine	Democratic Republic of the Congo	meat	dairy		
American		taurindicine	United States	meat			
American Angus		taurus	United States	meat			
American Beef Friesian		taurus	United States	meat			American Angus/Beef Friesian crossbreed
American Brown Swiss		taurus	United States		dairy		
American Milking Devon		taurus	United States	meat	dairy	draught	
American White Park		taurus	United States	meat	dairy		
Amerifax		taurus	United States	meat	dairy		
Amrit Mahal		indicus	India				Developed from Hallikar cattle for war purposes
Amsterdam Island		taurus	Amsterdam Island				Feral
Anatolian Black		taurus	Turkey	meat	dairy	draught	
Andalusian Black		taurus	Spain	meat			Endangered
Andalusian Blond			Spain				
Andalusian Grey			Spain				
Angeln		taurus	Germany		dairy		
Angoni			Malawi				
Ankina			United States				
Ankole			East Africa	meat	dairy		
Ankole-Watusi		indicus	United States				Show
Aracena			Spain				
Arado			Ethiopia	meat	dairy	draught	
Argentine Criollo		taurus	Argentina	meat	dairy		
Argentine Friesian			Argentina		dairy		
Armorican		taurus	France	meat	dairy		
Arouquesa		taurus	Portugal	meat	dairy		
Arsi			Ethiopia				
Asturian Mountain		taurus	Spain	meat	dairy		
Asturian Valley		taurus	Spain	meat	dairy		
Aubrac		taurus	France	meat	dairy		
Aulie-Ata		taurus	Kazakhstan		dairy		
Aure et Saint-Girons		taurus	France	meat	dairy	draught	
Australian Braford		taurindicine	Australia	meat			
Australian Brangus		taurindicine	Australia	meat			
Australian Charbray		taurindicine	Australia	meat			
Australian Friesian Sahiwal		taurindicine	Australia		dairy		
Australian Lowline		taurus	Australia	meat			
Australian Milking Zebu		taurindicine	Australia		dairy		
Australian Shorthorn			Australia	meat			
Austrian Simmental			Austria				
Austrian Yellow			Austria				
Avétonou			Togo				
Avileña-Negra Ibérica			Spain				
Aweil Dinka			South Sudan				
Ayrshire		taurus	Scotland		dairy		
Azaouak			Mali				
Azebuado			Brazil				
Azerbaijan Zebu			Azerbaijan				
Azores			Portugal				

== B ==
Breed	Image	Subspecies	Country/region of origin	Meat	Dairy	Draught	Other
Bachaur		indicus	India		dairy	draught	
Baherie		indicus	Eritrea	meat	dairy		
Bakosi		taurus	Cameroon	meat			Rituals
Balancer		taurus	United States	meat	dairy		Gelbvieh/American Angus crossbreed
Baoule		taurus	Ivory Coast		dairy		
Bargur		indicus	India		dairy	draught	Semi-wild, native to Bargur forest region, bred and grazed by the local Lingayat community
Barrosã		taurus	Portugal	meat		draught	
Barzona		taurindicine	United States	meat			
Bazadaise		taurus	France	meat			
Beef Friesian		taurus	United States	meat	dairy		
Beefmaker		taurindicine	United States	meat			
Beefmaster	Several female cattle (heifers) of the Beefmaster breed	taurindicine	United States	meat			
Begayt			Ethiopia	meat	dairy	draught	
Belgian Blue		taurus	Belgium	meat	dairy		
Belgian Red		taurus	Belgium, France	meat	dairy	draught	Endangered
Belgian Red Pied		taurus	Belgium	meat	dairy		
Belgian White-and-Red		taurus	Belgium	meat	dairy		
Belmont Red		taurindicine	Australia	meat			
Belted Galloway		taurus	Scotland	meat			
Bernese			Switzerland				
Berrenda		taurus	Spain	meat	dairy	draught	Sport
Betizu		taurus	Spain, France	meat		draught	Semi-feral
Bianca Modenese	A bull of the Bianca Modenese breed of cattle stands in the center of the frame.	taurus	Italy	meat	dairy		
Blaarkop		taurus	Netherlands	meat	dairy		
Blanca Cacereña		taurus	Spain	meat	dairy	draught	
Blanco Orejinegro BON		taurus	Colombia	meat	dairy	draught	
Blonde d'Aquitaine		taurus	France	meat	dairy	draught	
Blue Albion		taurus	Great Britain	meat			
Blue Grey		taurus	Great Britain	meat			
Bohuskulla			Sweden				
Bonsmara	A Bonsmara bull in Namibia	taurindicine	South Africa	meat			
Boran		indicus	eastern Africa	meat			
Boškarin		taurus	Croatia, Slovenia	meat	dairy	draught	
Braford		taurindicine	United States	meat			Hereford/Brahman crossbreed
Brahman		indicus	India	meat	dairy	draught	
Brahmousin		taurindicine	United States	meat		draught	
Brangus		taurindicine	United States	meat			American Angus/Brahman crossbreed
Braunvieh		taurus	Switzerland	meat	dairy		
Brava			Spain				
Bretonne Pie Noir		taurus	France	meat	dairy		
British White		taurus	Great Britain	meat	dairy		
British Friesian		taurus	Great Britain		dairy		
Brown Carpathian		taurus	Ukraine				
Brown Caucasian		taurus	Armenia	meat	dairy		
Brown Swiss		taurus	Switzerland		dairy		
Bue Lingo		taurus	United States	meat	dairy		
Burlina		taurus	Italy		dairy		
Buša		taurus	former Yugoslavia: *Bosnia and Herzegovina; *Croatia; *Kosovo; *Montenegro; *North Macedonia; *Serbia	meat	dairy	draught	
Butana		indicus	Sudan		dairy		
Bushuyev		indicus	Uzbekistan		dairy		

== C ==
Breed	Image	Subspecies	Country/region of origin	Meat	Dairy	Draught	Other
Cachena		taurus	Portugal/Spain	meat	dairy	draught	
Caldelana		taurus	Spain	meat	dairy	draught	
Camargue		taurus	France	meat		draught	Sport, semi-feral
Campbell Island		taurus	New Zealand				Feral
Canadian Speckle Park		taurus	Canada	meat			
Canadienne		taurus	Canada	meat	dairy		
Canaria		taurus	Spain	meat		draught	
Canchim		taurindicine	Brazil	meat			
Caracu		taurus	Brazil	meat	dairy	draught	
Cárdena Andaluza		taurus	Spain	meat		draught	
Carinthian Blondvieh		taurus	Austria	meat	dairy	draught	
Carora		taurus	Venezuelan	meat	dairy	draught	
Charbray		taurindicine	United States	meat			
Charolais		taurus	France	meat		draught	
Casanareño		taurus	Colombia and Venezuela	meat	dairy		The Casanareño is a Colombian and Venezuelan creole cattle breed from the Orinoco Llanos, descended from Spanish cattle and shaped by natural selection for hardiness, disease resistance, and adaptation to harsh tropical savanna conditions.
Chiangus		taurus		meat			
Chianina		taurus	Italy	meat		draught	
Chillingham		taurus	England				Feral
Chinese Black Pied		taurus	China		dairy		
Chino Santandereano		taurus	Colombia	meat	dairy		The Chino Santandereano is a Colombian creole cattle breed known for its rusticity and adaptability, developed from Spanish cattle introduced during the colonial period and naturally selected over time in the Santander region.
Cholistani		indicus	Pakistan		dairy		
Cika		taurus	Slovenia	meat	dairy		
Corriente		taurus	Spain	meat	dairy	draught	Sport
Corsican		taurus	France	meat			Often free-ranging, semi-feral
Costeño con Cuernos		taurus	Colombia	meat	dairy	draught	
Crioulo Lageano			Brazil				

== D ==
Breed	Image	Subspecies	Country/region of origin	Meat	Dairy	Draught	Other
Dairy Shorthorn		taurus	United Kingdom	meat	dairy		
Dajal		indicus	Pakistan	meat	dairy	draught	
Dangi		indicus	India			draught	
Danish Black-Pied			Denmark				
Danish Jersey	A cow of the Danish Jersey breed lying down in a field.	taurus	Denmark		dairy		
Danish Red		taurus	Denmark	meat	dairy		
Deoni		indicus	India		dairy	draught	
Devon		taurus	England	meat	dairy		
Dexter		taurus	Ireland	meat	dairy		
Dhanni		indicus	Pakistan	meat	dairy	draught	
Doayo		taurus	Cameroon				
Drakensberger		taurus	South Africa	meat	dairy		
Dølafe		taurus	Norway	meat	dairy		
Droughtmaster		taurindicine	Australia	meat			
Dutch Friesian		taurus	Netherlands	meat	dairy		

== E ==
Breed	Image	Subspecies	Country/region of origin	Meat	Dairy	Draught	Other
East Anatolian Red		taurus			dairy		
Eastern Finncattle		taurus	Finland	meat	dairy		
Enderby Island		Unknown	New Zealand				Feral
English Longhorn		taurus	England	meat	dairy		
Ennstaler Bergscheck		taurus	Austria	meat		draught	
Estonian Holstein		taurus	Estonia		dairy		
Estonian Native			Estonia				
Estonian Red	A cow of the Estonian Red breed has her nose close to the camera, investigating the lens.	taurus	Estonia	meat	dairy		
Évolène		taurus	Switzerland		dairy		

== F ==
Breed	Image	Subspecies	Country/region of origin	Meat	Dairy	Draught	Other
Finnish Ayrshire			Finland		dairy		
Finncattle		taurus	Finland	meat	dairy		
Finnish Holstein-Friesian			Finland				
Fjäll		taurus	Sweden	meat	dairy		Also called Swedish Mountain
Fleckvieh		taurus	Austria	meat	dairy		
Florida Cracker		taurus	United States	meat			
Fogera			Ethiopia	meat	dairy	draught	
French Simmental		taurus	France	meat	dairy		
Fribourgeoise	An engraving of a Fribourgeoise cow, in color. It is black and white and standing in a field.		Switzerland				
Friesian Red and White		taurus		meat	dairy		

== G ==
Breed	Image	Subspecies	Country/region of origin	Meat	Dairy	Draught	Other
Galician Blond		taurus	Spain	meat	dairy		
Galloway		taurus	Scotland	meat	dairy	draught	
Gangatiri		indicus	India		dairy	draught	
Gaolao		indicus	India		dairy	draught	
Garvonesa		taurus	Portugal	meat		draught	
Gascon		taurus	France	meat		draught	
Gelbvieh		taurus	Germany	meat	dairy	draught	
Georgian Mountain		taurus	Georgia	meat	dairy	draught	
German Angus		taurus	Germany	meat			
German Black Pied		taurus	Germany		dairy		
German Black Pied Dairy		taurus	Germany		dairy		
German Red Pied		taurus	Germany	meat	dairy		
Gir		indicus	India		dairy		
Glamorgan		taurus	England	meat	dairy		
Glan		taurus	Germany	meat	dairy	draught	
Gloucester		taurus	England	meat	dairy	draught	
Gobra		indicus	Mauritania, Senegal	meat		draught	
Greek Shorthorn		taurus	Greece	meat	dairy		
Greek Steppe		taurus	Greece	meat	dairy	draught	
Greyman		taurindicine	Australia	meat			
Gudali		indicus	Iran/Persia		dairy	draught	
Guernsey		taurus	Channel Islands		dairy		
Guzerá		indicus	Brazil	meat		draught	

== H ==
Breed	Image	Subspecies	Country/region of origin	Meat	Dairy	Draught	Other
Hallikar		indicus	India			draught	Origin of Amrit Mahal cattle
Hanwoo		taurus	Korea	meat		draught	Cow fighting
Hariana		indicus	India		dairy	draught	
Hartón del Valle		taurus	Colombia	meat	dairy	draught	
Harzer Rotvieh		taurus	Germany	meat	dairy	draught	
Hays Converter		taurus	Canada	meat			
Heck	A cow of the Heck breed stands. It is black with horns.	taurus	Germany				Science
Hereford		taurus	England	meat			
Herens		taurus	Switzerland, Italy, France	meat			Cow fighting
Highland		taurus	Scotland	meat			
Hinterwald		taurus	Germany	meat	dairy		
Holando-Argentino		taurus	Argentina	meat	dairy		
Holstein Friesian		taurus	Germany, the Netherlands	meat	dairy		
Horro		indicus	Ethiopia	meat		draught	
Huáng		taurus	China	meat	dairy	draught	
Hungarian Grey		taurus	Hungary	meat		draught	

== I ==
Breed	Image	Subspecies	Country/region of origin	Meat	Dairy	Draught	Other
Icelandic		taurus	Iceland		dairy		
Illawarra		taurus	Australia	meat	dairy		
Improved Red and White		taurus	Netherlands	meat			
Indo-Brazilian		indicus		meat			
Irish Moiled		taurus	Ireland	meat	dairy		
Israeli Holstein		taurus	Israel		dairy		
Israeli Red		taurindicine	Israel	meat	dairy		
Istoben		taurus		meat	dairy		
Istrian		see Boškarin					

== J ==
Breed	Image	Subspecies	Country/region of origin	Meat	Dairy	Draught	Other
Jamaica Black		taurindicine	Jamaica	meat	dairy		
Jamaica Hope		taurindicine	Jamaica		dairy		
Jamaica Red		taurindicine	Jamaica	meat			
Japanese Black		taurus	Japan	meat			One of the four wagyu breeds
Japanese Brown		taurus	Japan	meat			One of the four wagyu breeds
Japanese Polled		taurus	Japan	meat			One of the four wagyu breeds
Japanese Shorthorn		taurus	Japan	meat			One of the four wagyu breeds
Jarmelista		taurus	Portugal	meat		draught	
Javari		indicus	India			draught	
Jersey		taurus	Channel Islands		dairy		
Jutland		taurus	Denmark	meat	dairy		

== K ==
Breed	Image	Subspecies	Country/region of origin	Meat	Dairy	Draught	Other
Kabin Buri		taurindicine	Thailand	meat	dairy		Brahman/Simmental crossbreed
Kalmyk		taurus	Russia	meat	dairy		
Kangayam		indicus	India		dairy	draught	
Kankrej		indicus	India		dairy	draught	
Kamphaeng Saen		taurindicine	Thailand	meat			
Karan Swiss		taurindicine	India	meat	dairy		
Kasaragod Dwarf		indicus	India		dairy	draught	
Kathiawadi		indicus	India			draught	
Kazakh Whiteheaded		taurus	Kazakhstan	meat	dairy		
Kenana		indicus	Sudan		dairy		
Kenkatha		indicus	India			draught	
Kerry		taurus	Ireland	meat	dairy		
Kherigarh		indicus	India			draught	
Khillari		indicus	India			draught	
Kholomogory		taurus	Russia	meat	dairy		
Korat Wagyu		taurindicine	Thailand	meat			
Kostroma		taurus	Russia	meat	dairy		
Krishna Valley		indicus	India		dairy	draught	
Kuri		taurus		meat	dairy	draught	
Kurgan		taurus	Russia	meat	dairy		

== L ==
Breed	Image	Subspecies	Country/region of origin	Meat	Dairy	Draught	Other
La Reina		taurus	Nicaragua	meat	dairy		
Lakenvelder		taurus	Netherlands		dairy		
Latvian Blue				Latvia			
Latvian Brown		taurus	Latvia	meat	dairy		
Latvian Danish Red		taurus	Latvia	meat	dairy		
Lebedyn		taurus	Ukraine				
Limia		taurus	Spain	meat	dairy	draught	
Limousin		taurus	France	meat		draught	
Limpurger		taurus		meat	dairy		
Lincoln Red		taurus	England	meat			
Lynch Lineback		taurus	Canada		dairy		
Lithuanian Black-and-White			Lithuania				
Lithuanian Light Grey			Lithuania				
Lithuanian Red			Lithuania	meat			
Lithuanian White-Backed			Lithuania				
Lohani		indicus	Pakistan	meat		draught	
Lourdais		taurus	France	meat	dairy	draught	
Lucerna		taurus	Colombia		dairy		The Lucerna cattle breed from Colombia is a dual-purpose breed developed through crossbreeding of Holstein, Shorthorn, and Hartón del Valle, combining good milk production, meat quality, and adaptability to tropical conditions.
Luing		taurus	Scotland	meat			

== M ==
Breed	Image	Subspecies	Country/region of origin	Meat	Dairy	Draught	Other
Madagascar Zebu		indicus	Madagascar	meat	dairy	draught	
Maine-Anjou		taurus	France	meat	dairy	draught	
Malnad Gidda		indicus	India		dairy	draught	Semi-dwarf breed
Malvi		indicus	India		dairy	draught	
Mandalong Special		taurindicine	Australia	meat			
Mantequera Leonesa		taurus	Spain	meat	dairy	draught	
Maraîchine		taurus	France	meat			
Maramureş Brown			Romania				
Marchigiana		taurus	Italy	meat		draught	
Maremmana		taurus	Italy	meat	dairy	draught	
Marinhoa		taurus	Portugal	meat	dairy	draught	
Maronesa		taurus	Portugal	meat	dairy	draught	
Masai		indicus		meat		draught	
Mashona		taurus	Zimbabwe	meat		draught	
Menorquina		taurus	Spain		dairy		
Mertolenga		taurus	Portugal	meat		draught	
Meuse-Rhine-Issel		taurus	Netherlands	meat	dairy		
Mewati		indicus	India		dairy	draught	
Milking Shorthorn		taurus	Canada, United States	meat	dairy		
Minhota		taurus	Portugal	meat	dairy	draught	
Mirandesa		taurus	Portugal	meat		draught	
Mirkadim			Bangladesh	meat			
Mocăniţă			Romania				
Monchina		taurus	Spain	meat		draught	
Mongolian		taurus	China	meat		draught	
Montbéliarde		taurus	France	meat	dairy		
Morucha		taurus	Spain	meat		draught	Fighting
Muturu		Taurus africanus	Nigeria	meat	dairy		
Murboden		taurus	Austria	meat	dairy	draught	
Murciana-Levantina		taurus	Spain	meat		draught	
Murnau-Werdenfels		taurus	Germany		dairy		
Murray Grey		taurus	Australia	meat			

== N ==
Breed	Image	Subspecies	Country/region of origin	Meat	Dairy	Draught	Other
Nagori		indicus	India			draught	
N'Dama		taurus	Guinea	meat	dairy		
Negra Andaluza		taurus	Spain	meat		draught	
Nelore		indicus	India	meat		draught	
Nguni		taurindicine	Southern Africa	meat	dairy		
Nimari		indicus	India			draught	
Normande		taurus	France	meat	dairy		
North Bengal Grey			Bangladesh	meat	dairy		
Northern Finncattle		taurus	Finland	meat	dairy		
Northern Shorthorn		taurus	Great Britain		dairy		
Norwegian Red		taurus	Norway	meat	dairy		

== O ==
Breed	Image	Subspecies	Country/region of origin	Meat	Dairy	Draught	Other
Ongole		indicus	India	meat	dairy	draught	
Original Simmental		taurus	Switzerland/Germany	meat	dairy		

== P ==
Breed	Image	Subspecies	Country/region of origin	Meat	Dairy	Draught	Other
Pajuna		taurus	Spain	meat		draught	
Palmera		taurus	Spain	meat		draught	Sport
Pantaneiro			Brazil				
Parda Alpina		taurus	Spain	meat	dairy		
Parthenaise		taurus	France	meat		draught	
Pasiega		taurus	Spain		dairy		
Pembroke		taurus	Wales	meat	dairy		
Philippine Native	Philippine cow and calf	taurus	Philippines	meat	dairy	draught	
Pie Rouge des Plaines		taurus	France		dairy		
Piedmontese		taurus	Italy	meat	dairy		
Pineywoods		taurus	United States	meat	dairy	draught	
Pinzgauer		taurus	Austria	meat	dairy		
Pirenaica		taurus	Spain, France	meat		draught	
Podolac		taurus	Croatia	meat	dairy	draught	
Podolica		taurus	Italy	meat	dairy	draught	
Polish Black-and-White			Poland				
Polish Red		taurus	Poland	meat	dairy	draught	
Polled Hereford		taurus	England	meat			
Poll Shorthorn		taurus	Australia	meat			
Polled Shorthorn		taurus	United States	meat			
Ponwar		indicus	India			draught	
Preta		taurus	Portugal	meat		draught	
Prim'Holstein (Note: Holstein Friesian subtype)		taurus	France	meat	dairy		
Punganur		indicus	India	meat	dairy	draught	
Pulikulam		indicus	India		dairy	draught	Jallikattu
Pustertaler Sprinzen		taurus	Italy	meat			

== Q ==
Breed	Image	Subspecies	Country/region of origin	Meat	Dairy	Draught	Other
Qinchaun		taurus	China	meat		draught	

== R ==
Breed	Image	Subspecies	Country/region of origin	Meat	Dairy	Draught	Other
Ramo Grande		taurus	Portugal	meat	dairy	draught	
Randall		taurus	United States	meat	dairy	draught	
Raramuri Criollo		taurus	Chihuahua, Mexico	meat	dairy		
Rathi		indicus	India		dairy	draught	Domestic
Rätisches Grauvieh		taurus	Switzerland	meat	dairy	draught	
Raya			Ethiopia	meat	dairy	draught	
Red Angus		taurus	Scotland	meat	dairy		
Red Brangus		taurindicine		meat			
Red Chittagong		indicus	Bangladesh			draught	Good reproductive performance
Red Fulani		taurindicine	West Africa	meat			
Red Gorbatov		taurus	Russia		dairy		
Red Holstein		taurus			dairy		
Red Kandhari		indicus	India			draught	Domestic
Red Mingrelian			Georgia	meat	dairy		
Red Poll		taurus	England	meat	dairy		
Red Polled Østland		taurus	Norway	meat	dairy		
Red Sindhi		indicus	Pakistan	meat	dairy		
Retinta		taurus		meat		draught	
Riggit Galloway		taurus		meat			
Ringamåla		taurus	Sweden		dairy		
Romagnola		taurus	Italy	meat		draught	
Romanian Bălțata			Romania				
Romanian Grey			Romania				
Romosinuano		taurus	Colombia	meat			
Russian Black Pied		taurus	Russia	meat	dairy	draught	

== S ==
Breed	Image	Subspecies	Country/region of origin	Meat	Dairy	Draught	Other
Sahiwal		indicus	Pakistan	meat	dairy		
Sibi Bhagnari		indicus	Sibi, Pakistan	meat		draught	Sibi Mela
Salers		taurus	France	meat		draught	
Salorn		taurus	United States	meat			
Sanga		taurindicine		meat			
Sanhe		taurus	China	meat	dairy	draught	
Sanmartinero		taurus	Colombia	meat			The Sanmartinero is a Colombian creole cattle breed originating in the Llanos Orientales, descended from Spanish cattle and naturally selected for centuries for heat tolerance, disease resistance, and adaptability to tropical savanna conditions.
Santa Cruz		taurindicine	United States	meat			
Santa Gertrudis		taurindicine	United States	meat			
Sayaguesa		taurus	Spain	meat		draught	
Senepol		taurindicine		meat			
Serbian Pied		taurus	Serbia		dairy		
Serbian Steppe		taurus	Serbia			draught	
Sheko			Ethiopia				
Shetland		taurus	Scotland	meat	dairy	draught	
Shorthorn		taurus	England	meat			
Siboney de Cuba		taurindicine	Cuba	meat		draught	
Simbrah		taurindicine		meat			
Simford		taurus		meat			
Simmental		taurus	Switzerland	meat	dairy	draught	
Siri		indicus	Bhutan		dairy	draught	
South Devon		taurus	England	meat	dairy		
Spanish Fighting Bull		taurus	Spain	meat			Sport
Speckle Park		taurus	Canada	meat			
Square Meater		taurus	Australia	meat			
Stabiliser		taurus	United States	meat			
Sudanese Fulani		indicus	Mali	meat	dairy	draught	
Sussex		taurus	England	meat			
Swedish Friesian		taurus	Sweden		dairy		
Swedish Polled		taurus	Sweden		dairy		
Swedish Red Pied		taurus	Sweden		dairy		
Swedish Red Polled		taurus	Sweden	meat	dairy		
Swedish Red-and-White		taurus	Sweden	meat	dairy		

== T ==
Breed	Image	Subspecies	Country/region of origin	Meat	Dairy	Draught	Other
Tabapuã		indicus	Brazil	meat	dairy	Draught	
Tarentaise		taurus	France	meat	dairy		
Tasmanian Grey		taurus	Australia	meat			
Telemark		taurus	Norway	meat	dairy		
Texas Longhorn		taurus	United States	meat	dairy		
Texon		taurus	United States	meat			
Thai Black		taurindicine	Thailand	meat			
Thai Fighting Bull		indicus	Thailand				Sport
Thai Friesian		taurindicine	Thailand		dairy		
Thai Milking Zebu		taurindicine	Thailand		dairy		
Tharparkar		indicus	India/ Pakistan		dairy	draught	
Tswana		taurus	Botswana	meat	dairy		
Tudanca		taurus	Spain	meat	dairy	draught	Grazing projects, rewilding
Tuli		taurus	Zimbabwe	meat	dairy		
Tulim		taurindicine	South-Africa	meat			
Turkish Grey Steppe		taurus		meat		draught	
Tux-Zillertal		taurus	Austria	meat			
Tyrol Grey		taurus	Austria	meat	dairy		

== U ==
Breed	Image	Subspecies	Country/region of origin	Meat	Dairy	Draught	Other
Umblachery		indicus	India		dairy	draught	
Ukrainian Grey		taurus	Ukraine				

== V ==
Breed	Image	Subspecies	Country/region of origin	Meat	Dairy	Draught	Other
Valdostana Castana			Italy				
Valdostana Pezzata Nera			Italy				
Valdostana Pezzata Rossa			Italy				
Väneko			Sweden				
Vaynol		taurus	Wales	meat			
Vechur		indicus	India		dairy		Milk and ghee traditionally used in Ayurvedic medicine. The protein content of the milk has anti-bacterial properties
Velazquez		Taurindicine	Colombia	meat			The Velásquez cattle breed in Colombia was developed by Dr. Hernando Velásquez through controlled crossbreeding of Brahman, Romosinuano, and Red polled cattle.
Vestland Fjord		taurus	Norway	meat	dairy		
Vestland Red Polled		taurus	Norway	meat	dairy		
Vianesa		taurus		meat	dairy		
Volinian Beef			Ukraine	meat			
Vorderwald		taurus	Germany	meat	dairy		
Vosgienne		taurus	France	meat	dairy		

== W ==
Breed	Image	Subspecies	Country/region of origin	Meat	Dairy	Draught	Other
Waguli		taurus	USA	meat			
Wangus		taurindicine		meat			
Welsh Black		taurus	Wales	meat			
Western Finncattle		taurus	Finland	meat	dairy		
White Cáceres		taurus	Spain	meat		draught	
White Fulani		indicus	Cameroon, Nigeria	meat			
White Lamphun		indicus	Thailand			draught	
White Park		taurus	Great Britain	meat	dairy		
Whitebred Shorthorn		taurus	Great Britain	meat			

== X ==
Breed	Image	Subspecies	Country/region of origin	Meat	Dairy	Draught	Other
Xinjiang Brown		taurus		meat	dairy	draught	

== Y ==
Breed	Image	Subspecies	Country/region of origin	Meat	Dairy	Draught	Other
Yakutian		taurus	Russia	meat	dairy	draught	
Yanbian		taurus	China		draught		
Yanhuang		taurindicine	China				
Yurino		taurus	Ukraine				

== Hybrids ==
In some parts of the world further species of cattle are found (both as wild and domesticated animals), and some of these are related so closely to taurine and indicus cattle that interspecies hybrids have been bred. Examples include the Dwarf Lulu cattle of the mountains of Nepal, which bears yak blood; the Beefalo of North America, with bison genes; and the Selembu breed of India and Bhutan, with gayal genes. The Madura breed of Indonesia may have banteng in its parentage. In addition to these fertile hybrids, there are sterile hybrids such as the male Dzo of Nepal, a cattle-yak hybrid which is bred for agricultural work; like the mule and the hinny, they have to be continually bred from both of the parent species.

Breed	Image	Subspecies	Country/region of origin	Meat	Dairy	Draught	Other
American Breed		taurus/indicus/American bison	United States	meat			
Beefalo		taurus/American bison	United States	meat			
Dwarf Lulu		taurus/indicus/yak					
Madura		indicus/banteng	Indonesia	meat	dairy	draught	Racing
Selembu		indicus/gaur		meat	dairy		
Żubroń		taurus/European bison	Poland	Meat			Science

== See also ==
- List of dairy cattle breeds
- List of beef cattle breeds
- Lists of domestic animal breeds
- Villard-de-Lans
