= Black Pied cattle =

Black Pied cattle refer to a range of cattle breeds, including:

- Chinese Black Pied cattle
- German Black Pied cattle or Dutch Black Pied Cattle
- German Black Pied Dairy cattle
- Russian Black Pied cattle
