= Kurgan cattle =

Breed of cattle

The Kurgan (or Kurganskaya) cattle breed originates in south-western Siberia and is a composite of Shorthorn, Simmental, German Black Pied Cattle, Bestuzhev, Tagil, Red Steppe, and local cattle. Its coat colourations are red, red and white, or roan. Its primary domesticated uses are beef and dairy.
