= Lucerna =

Lucerna may refer to:

- Lucerna, Ocotepeque, a municipality in Honduras
- Lucerne, a city in Switzerland
- Lucerna (cattle)
- Lucerna (gastropod), a genus of snails in the family Pleurodontidae
- Lucerna (play), a play by Alois Jirásek
- The Lantern (1925 film), (Czech: Lucerna), a 1925 Czech film based on Jirásek's play
- The Lantern (1938 film), (Czech: Lucerna), a 1938 Czech film based on Jirásek's play
- Lucerna Palace, an entertainment and shopping complex in Prague, Czechia
- Lucerna Music Bar, a concert club within Lucerna Palace
- Lucerna Laudoniæ a hymn tune by David Evans
