= Aceh (disambiguation) =

Aceh is a province of Indonesia.

Aceh or ACEH may also refer to:

== Relating to Indonesia ==
- Aceh Sultanate
- Aceh cattle
- Mie Aceh

== Other uses ==
- Angiotensin-converting enzyme 2, an enzyme
