= Aulie-Ata cattle =

Breed of cattle

Aulie-Ata is a breed of dairy cattle, developed in the town of Aulie-Ata (now Taraz) in Kazakhstan, in late 19th early 20th century by breeding local Kazakh cattle with Dutch Black Pied Cattle. Planned breeding began in 1935 and the new breed was officially recognised in 1950. On average, Aulie-Ata cows produce 3735 kg of milk per lactation.
