= La Reina cattle =

Breed of cattle

La Reina (also known as the Creole cattle) is a Nicaraguan local breed originating from the Bos taurus varieties brought to America during the Spanish colonization in the 15th century. In the 1950s Joaquin Reyna and her Friend Costantino Sacasa Carazo, both being Nicaraguan breeders, formed a herd with approximately 200 females with typical characteristics of Creole cattle from which the Reyna breed was created, their name originating from Joaquin Reyna himself. Selection of animals was focused on red coat colour (sorrel) and milk production. The Nicaraguan government started an official inventory in the 1970s and in 1988 the Reyna cattle were declared as national patrimony, and in conjunction with the National Agrarian University of Nicaragua (Universidad Nacional Agraria) (UNA) agreed to a genetic improvement program of the cattle. The purebred Reyna Creole cattle population in Nicaragua consists of about 650 purebred females, including calves, heifers and cows distributed in five herds. Considering four herds with records the number of cows presently amount to 285.

== Characteristics ==
La Reina cattle have special characteristics for the tropics, they possess genes that make them heat tolerant. It is a very useful breed in the Nicaraguan agrarian culture as it can be used for both meat, dairy, and work purposes.

Average birth weight was 27.8 kg, age at first calving 37.4 months and calving interval 14.0 months. Large differences between herds were observed for all traits. Heritabilities were 0.34, zero and 0.20 for the respective trait. Average lactation yield for 534 Reyna cows with 1,750 lactation was 1,319 kg with large variations between herds and time periods. Test-day records on milk yield and fat and protein contents were collected monthly during one year for three Reyna herds and two herds with crossbred cows. Commercial dairy breed crosses had the highest production, and Reyna the lowest, but large differences were noted in management between the herds. The heritability for lactation yield in Reyna cattle was 0.18. Large variation between and within the Reyna herds suggest good opportunities to increase productivity of the Reyna breed by improving management and breeding strategies. It is proposed to keep all females in the herds, develop mating plans and to apply a recording scheme for keeping pedigrees and records on reproduction and milk production traits. Only young bulls, selected from the best cows for milk production and calving interval, are proposed to be used for 1–2 years each to manage inbreeding and keep generation intervals short.

La Reina cattle are red in colour and are slick haired, giving superior heat tolerance. They are a dairy breed that can give up to 7000 pounds of milk on forage only diets.
