= Tipo Carora =

Venezuelan breed of dairy cattle

- Conservation status: FAO (2007): extinct
- Other names: Carora; Caroreña
- Country of origin: Venezuela
- Use: dairy, cross-breeding

Traits
- Skin colour: black
- Coat: pale fawn or white
- Cattle; Bos (primigenius) taurus

The Tipo Carora or Carora is a Venezuelan breed of dairy cattle. It was bred in the early part of the twentieth century by crossing of local Criollo cows with imported Brown Swiss bulls. It is named for its place of origin, the town of Carora in the Venezuelan state of Lara.

== History ==
Breeding of the Tipo Carora began in the 1930s in the Venezuelan state of Lara, in western central Venezuela. Brown Swiss bulls from Europe and North America were used to live cover cows of the Amarillo de Quebrada Arriba, a local breed of Criollo cattle which was well adapted to the tropical conditions of the area, until about 85% of the genotype of the resulting stock derived from the Brown Swiss. A breeders' association, the Asociación Venezolana de Criadores de Ganado Carora, was started in 1979, and in 1982 the breed was officially recognised by the Venezuelan government. During the 1980s there was a sharp fall in breed numbers. In 1992, the breed was denominated a "Patrimonio Nacional" or national heritage; a programme of genetic improvement was begun, and a herd-book was established. In 2013 the registered population numbered 13 682 cows and 644 bulls.

== Characteristics ==
The Carora has black skin and a white or pale fawn-coloured coat. In approximately 90% of the cattle, the hair of the coat is glossy and short; this is caused by the slick hair gene often found in Criollo cattle. Selection for this characteristic in the Carora is intentional: bulls found – through observation of their male progeny – not to be homozygous for it are killed. The sleek short coat helps the cattle to stay cool in hot and humid tropical conditions; in their area of origin, monthly average temperatures vary between about 22 °C and 38 °C, and humidity may reach 90%.

== Use ==
The Carora was created as a dairy breed capable of producing well in a tropical climate. In 1998, cows were found to give an average of 3180 kg of milk in a lactation of 305 days; milk protein averages about 3.7%. Carora bulls – or semen from them – are extensively used for cross-breeding, both with Holstein cows to produce dairy animals with good tolerance of heat, and with cows of indicine breeds to produce dual-purpose cattle.
