= Anatolian Black =

Turkish breed of cattle

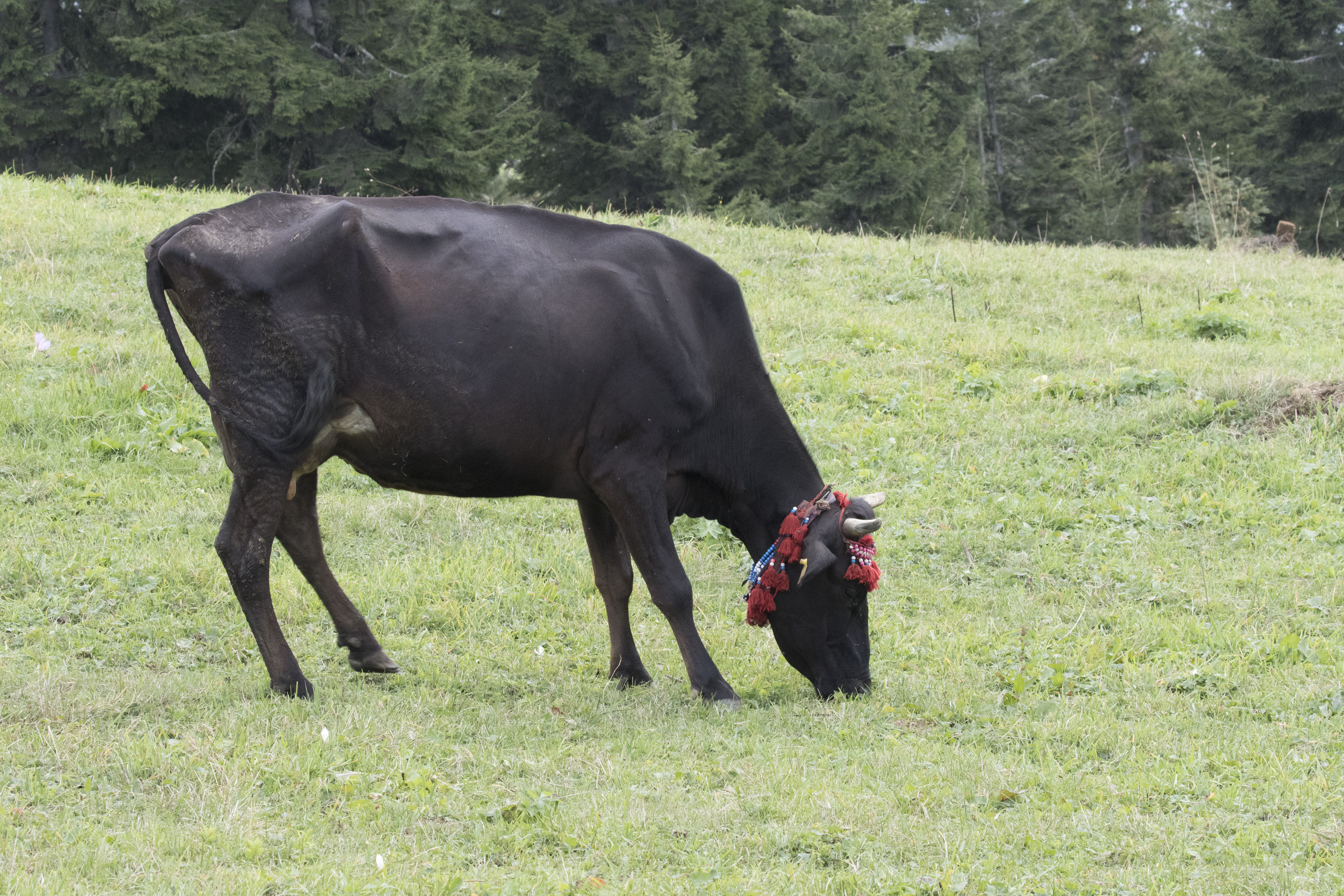
- Cow in Şalpazarı, in Trabzon Province
- Conservation status: endangered
- Other names: Anatolian Native
- Country of origin: Turkey
- Distribution: Central Turkey
- Use: triple-purpose, meat/milk/draught

Traits
- Weight: Male: 300-400 kg; Female: 200-300 kg

The Anatolian Black (Turkish: Yerli Kara), also known as Native Black Cattle, is a Turkish breed of cattle that originated in Anatolia. They are used in dairy production, meat production, and as draught animals on small farms. They are primarily raised in central Turkey.

The Anatolian Black is the smallest of the native cattle breeds of Turkey. It is closely related genetically to the East Anatolian Red and South Anatolian Red native Turkish breeds. These three breeds are collectively referred to as "Anatolian Native" cattle, and are distinguished on morphological and regional grounds, rather than genetically.

The breed is considered at risk of extinction, and the number of genetically pure individuals has decreased. This is due to crossbreeding with European breeds to improve productivity and yields, unconscious crossbreeding and poor management, as well as rural-urban migration. In order to save the Anatolian Black and other native cattle breeds, research has been conducted into how to improve their productivity, in order to become a more viable option for farmers. There is a conservation herd located at the Central Livestock Research Institute in Lalahan.

== Characteristics ==
The Anatolian Black is a taurine, short-horned variety of cattle. Conformation between animals tends to vary, and individuals can exhibit a beef or dairy build. They are small-bodied, with a long trunk and slim bones. Short ribs give a medium chest depth. Females grow 100–110 cm at the shoulder, have a body length of 110–120 cm, and weigh 200–300 kg. Males weigh 300–400 kg. The neck is of average length with a small dewlap. The rear end of the body is wider and higher than the front - shoulders are narrow, long and slant, and the rump is sharp and slant. The back is straight. Legs are short with strong hooves.

The head narrows towards the nose, and possesses profound eyes. Bulls have big heads with a convex profile; cows have narrower heads with a small, long face. Males and females are both horned.

The skin is thick and tough, and coat colour is usually raven black. The hair is slightly wavy on the neck, and hair on the inner surface of the ears is thick.

The cattle can survive harsh conditions, as well as poor care and diet. They are highly resistant to diseases and parasites. These characteristics make them a high priority for conservation. However, their adaptability and low maintenance characteristics have also come at a cost to productivity.

The breeding age for heifers is 24–28 months. Female birthweight is 17–19 kg; male birthweight is 18–20 kg. Cows possess a good maternal instinct, and the mother will not let her milk down unless she can see her calf.

== Uses ==
=== Milk ===
Cows can produce up to 1000–1100 kg of milk per lactation. Their lactation period can last from 240–260 days. The milk has a 4-5% fat content.

=== Meat ===
Anatolian Black cattle are one of the most important sources of beef in Turkey. They can be fattened rapidly - the daily liveweight gain in feedlots is 700-900 g.

=== Productivity ===
Their adaptability and low maintenance characteristics have unfortunately come at a cost to productivity, and in order to make them a viable option for local farmers, their outputs must be improved to match that of European breeds.
