= Russian Black Pied cattle =

Breed of cattle

The Russian Black Pied is a cattle breed that was developed from crossing the local cattle in various areas with the Dutch Black Pied and East Friesian breeds. By the beginning of 1980, the number of Black Pied cattle in Russia (excluding the Baltic population) was roughly 16.5 million. They are the second most common breed in the country.
