= North Bengal Grey =

Breed of cattle

- Other names: NGB
- Country of origin: Bangladesh
- Use: Dairy / Draft

The North Bengal Grey (NBG) is a breed of cattle indigenous to the northern part of Bangladesh.

Gallery

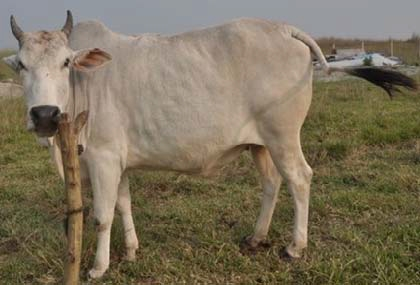

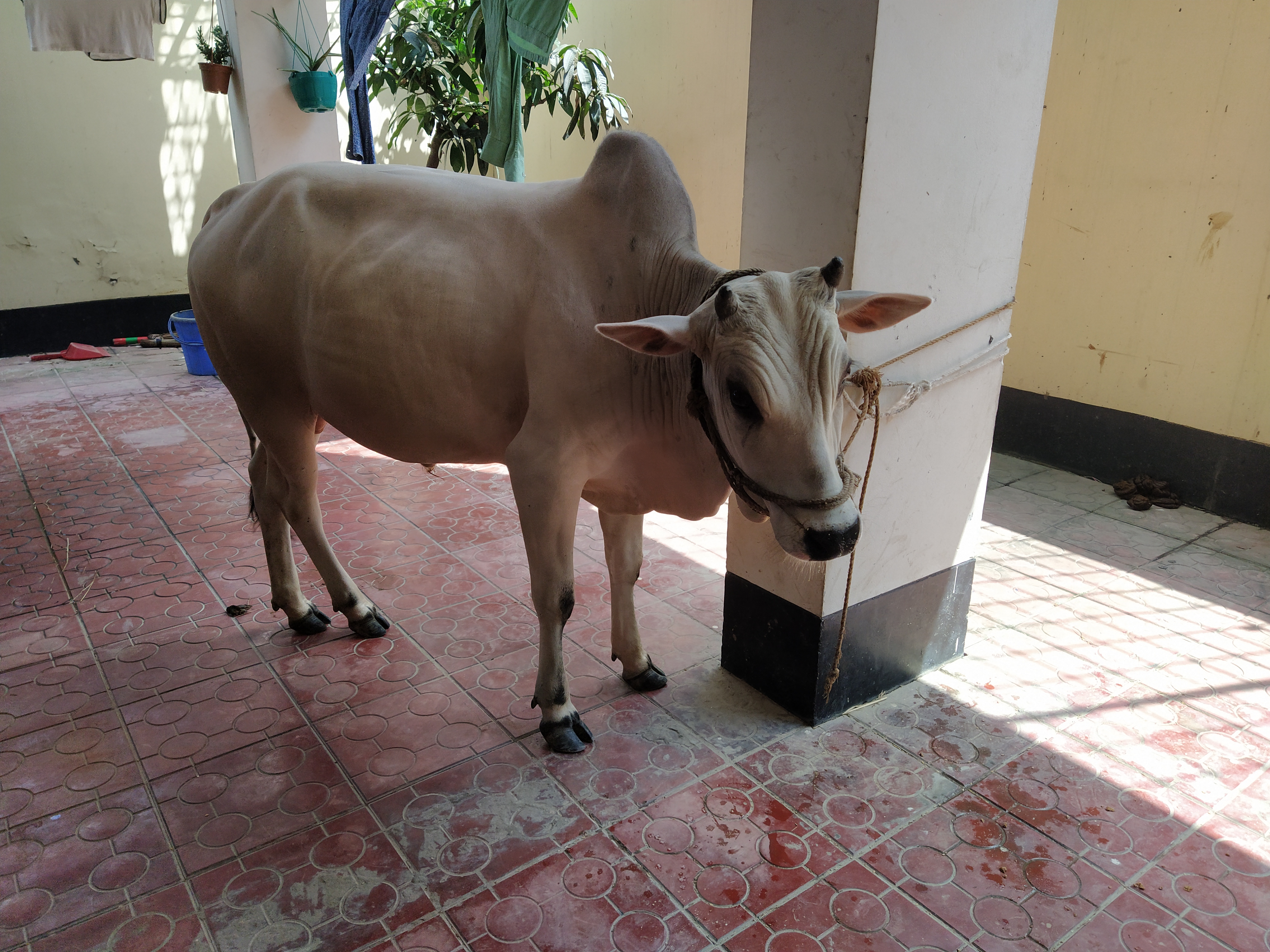

== See also ==
- List of breeds of cattle
