= Red Brangus =

American breed of cattle

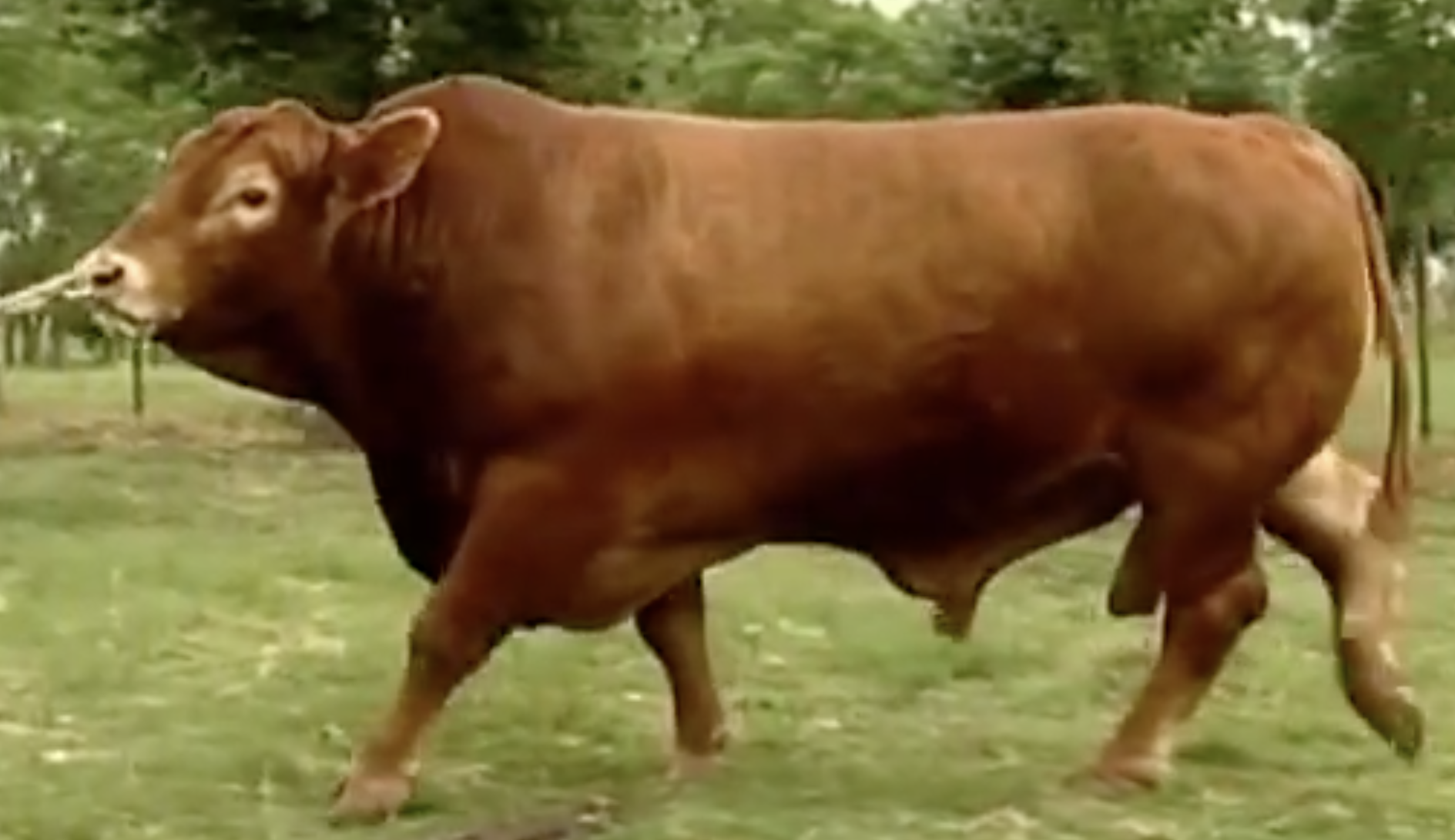
- A bull
- Conservation status: FAO (2007): not at risk; DAD-IS (2022): unknown/at risk
- Country of origin: United States of America
- Distribution: Panama, Peru, USA, Vietnam
- Standard: American Red Brangus Association
- Use: beef

Traits
- Coat: red
- Horn status: polled
- Cattle; Hybrid Bos (primigenius) taurus/indicus

The Red Brangus is an American breed of hybrid beef cattle, with both taurine and indicine genetic heritage. Development began in Texas in the 1940s. It is a color variant of the Brangus, a hybrid of American Angus and Brahman cattle, and differs from it only in color. There are two herd-books, one international and one American. For international registration the animal must be of 5/8 Angus and 3/8 Brahman descent; in the United States, it may be any mix of the two breeds, but registration is conditional on inspection.

== History ==
The American Brahman breed of indicine cattle was established in 1924. In the early 1930s, development of the Brangus taurine-indicine hybrid breed through cross-breeding between American Angus and Brahman stock began in Louisiana. The idea was to create a hybrid combining some of the meat qualities and polledness of the Angus with some of the resistance to heat and disease of the Brahman.

In the 1940s a Texas rancher named Matthew Levi, who had a grey Brahman bull and a herd of black Angus cows, found that matings yielded both black and red calves. He preferred the red hybrids, and bred from them. The Red Brangus was recognised as a breed in 1956.

There are two herd-books, one international and one American. For the international association the animal must be of 5/8 Angus and 3/8 Brahman descent; for the other, it may be any mix of the two breeds, but registration is conditional on inspection.

In 2000–2001 the total population in the USA numbered 2647, down from 5205 in 1990.

== Characteristics ==
The Red Brangus is polled, red-coated and of medium size.
