= Kostroma cattle =

Russian cattle breed

The Kostroma (Russian: костромская порода крупного рогатого скота, kostromskaya poroda krupnogo rogatogo skota, "Kostroma Cattle Breed") is a Russian cattle breed developed in the first half of the 20th century in the Kostroma Oblast of Russia's Upper Volga region, based mostly on crossbreeding local improved cattle with Brown Swiss, Allgau cattle and Ayrshire bulls. They are similar in appearance to Brown Swiss, but longer in head and body with a narrower forehead.

== Formation of the breed ==
Two improved herds of local cattle in the Kostroma area, the Miskov and Babaev herds, were the basis of the breed. The Babaev herd had been crossed with Allgau bulls from southern Germany in the late 19th century, and with Brown Swiss from 1912. From 1920 crossbreeding with Brown Swiss continued on State farms and some Ayrshire bulls were used. In 1940 the average milk yield in the herd of the Karavaevo state farm (today, Kostroma State Agricultural Academy, Костромская государственная сельскохозяйственная академия) reached 6310 kg. The breed was recognised by the Soviet People's Commissariat of Agriculture on November 27, 1944.

== Characteristics ==
Kostroma cattle are similar in appearance to Brown Swiss but longer in head and body. The forehead is narrower, while the back and loin is straighter and wider. Animals in Karavaevo are light grey in colour with a yellow top line. The breed are hardy and long-lived, with some cows producing until twenty years of age. Typical milk yield is 3900–5000 kg with the fat content of 3.7-3.9%; the protein content is 3.30-3.60%. Under intensive management they can produce 6000 to 8000 kg of milk per lactation, and as much as 10,000 from the best cows. The breed also has good beef characteristics.
