= Romanian Bălțata =

Cattle breed

The Romanian Bălțata or Romanian Spotted Cattle is the most common breed of cattle in Romania. Red and white in colour, it is resistant to poor nutrition and is used for milk and beef; it is particularly productive as a source of meat.

== Origin ==
As its name implies, the Romanian Bălțata was bred in Romania. It is descended from two breeds, Romanian Steppe Grey from Romania and Simmental imported from Switzerland, Austria, Germany, Czech Republic and Slovakia.

== Characteristics ==
A mature cow typically weighs 600 kg, while the bull typically weighs 900 kg. They stand 133 to 150 cm tall at the shoulder. Its annual milk production averages 4,500 liters, according to the data available in 2003. Of this, 4% is butterfat and 3.2% is protein.

== See also ==
List of cattle breeds
