= Red Chittagong =

Bangladeshi breed of cattle

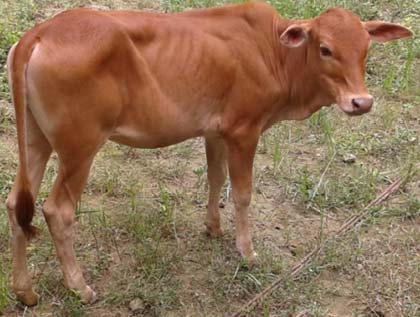
- A brownish-red cow
- Other names: Lal Birish
- Country of origin: Bangladesh
- Use: triple-purpose: milk, draught, beef
- Cattle; Bos (primigenius) indicus

The Red Chittagong is a Bangladeshi breed of triple-purpose cattle. Locally, the breed is known as Lal Birish.

The breed has mainly originated in the Chittagong District of southern Bangladesh. Red Chittagong is similar in most ways to the native or local cattle, except that its coats as well as tongue, eyebrow, eyeball, eyelash, horns, hooves, vulva and tail switch are also red. An RCC bull weighs about 250-400 kilograms, while its cow counterparts are roughly 150-250 kilograms.
