= Volinian Beef =

Ukrainian breed of beef cattle

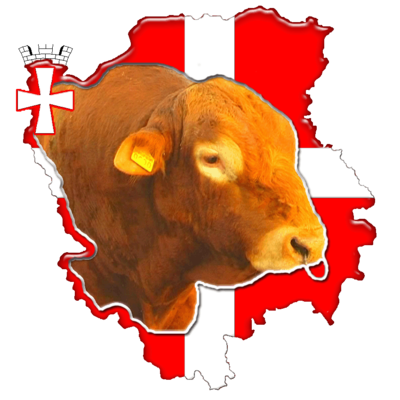
Volyn meat cattle logo

The Volinian Beef or Volynska is a Ukrainian breed of beef cattle. It was created in the Volyn Oblast of Ukraine between the years 1974 and 1994, and in 2009 represented about 28% of the beef herd of the country. It is the second cattle breed to have been developed in Ukraine; it resulted from cross-breeding of local Black-and-White and Red Polish cows with bulls of beef breeds including Aberdeen-Angus, Hereford and Limousin. The development of the breed is supported by the Ukrainian government; in 2011 the Volyn regional administration made grants of over ₴7.8 million (about €70,000) to breeders.
