= Lulu (cattle) =

Nepalese breed of cattle

- Conservation status: FAO (2007): not listed; DAD-IS (2026): unknown
- Country of origin: Nepal
- Distribution: Manang and Mustang Districts of Gandaki Province
- Use: draught work; milk

Traits
- Weight: Male: 150–227 kg; Female: 68–153 kg
- Height: Female: 74–90 cm

The Lulu is a Nepali breed of small humpless cattle. It is predominantly taurine in origin but also carries some zebuine and yak genes. It is distributed in the Manang and Mustang Districts of Gandaki Province in northern Nepal, and is well adapted to altitudes of 2500 to 4500 m above sea level.

It is believed to be closely similar or identical to the Kirko breed found elsewhere in Nepal, and thus also to the Goleng and Bajo breeds of Bhutan.

== Characterstics ==
The cattle are small: cows stand between 74–90 cm at the withers and usually weigh between 68 and 153 kg; bulls weigh from 150 to 227 kg.

== Use ==
The cattle are used for draught work and for milk. Milk yields are of the order of 1 to 2 kg per day.
