= Bargur cattle =

Breed of cattle

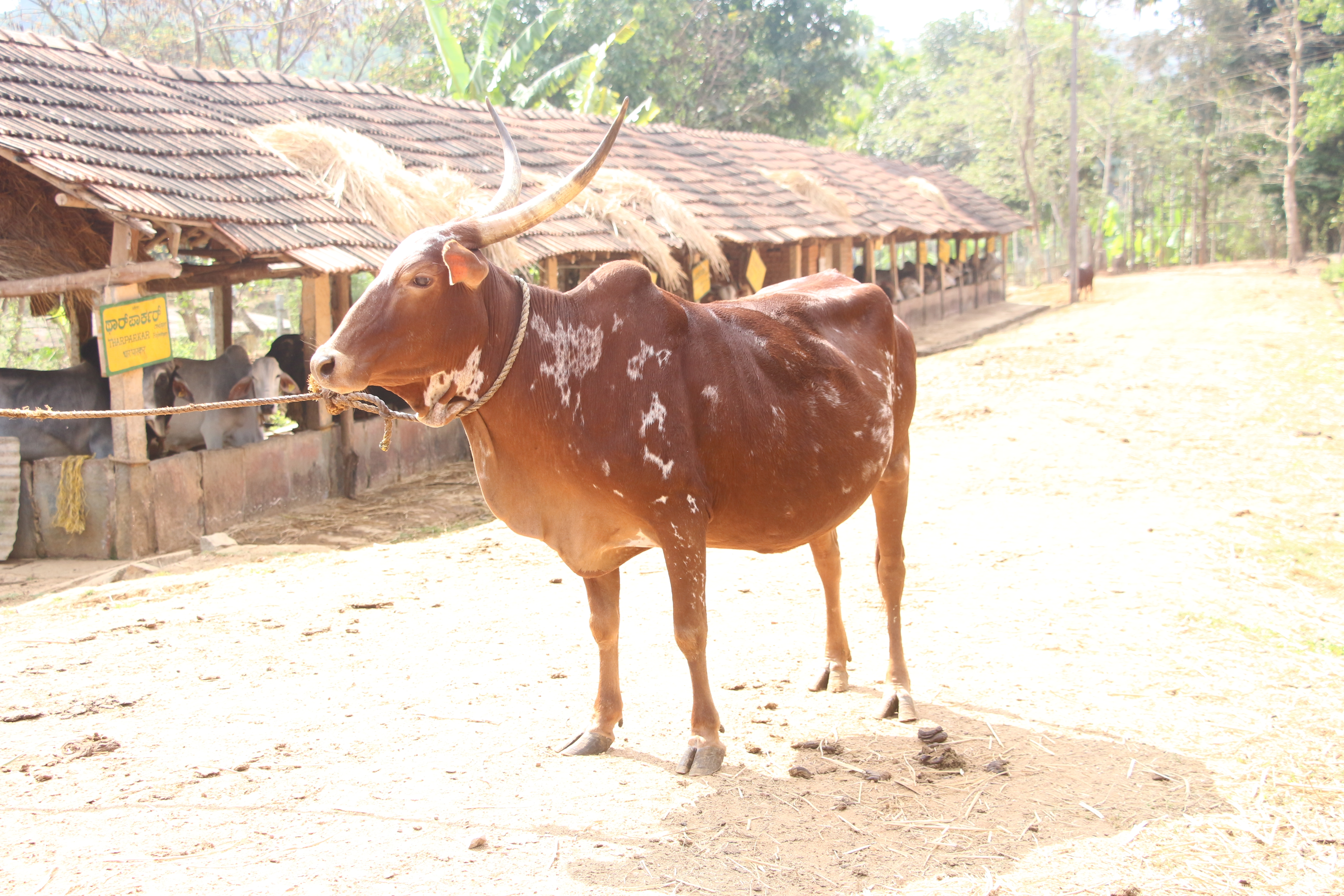
Bargur cow

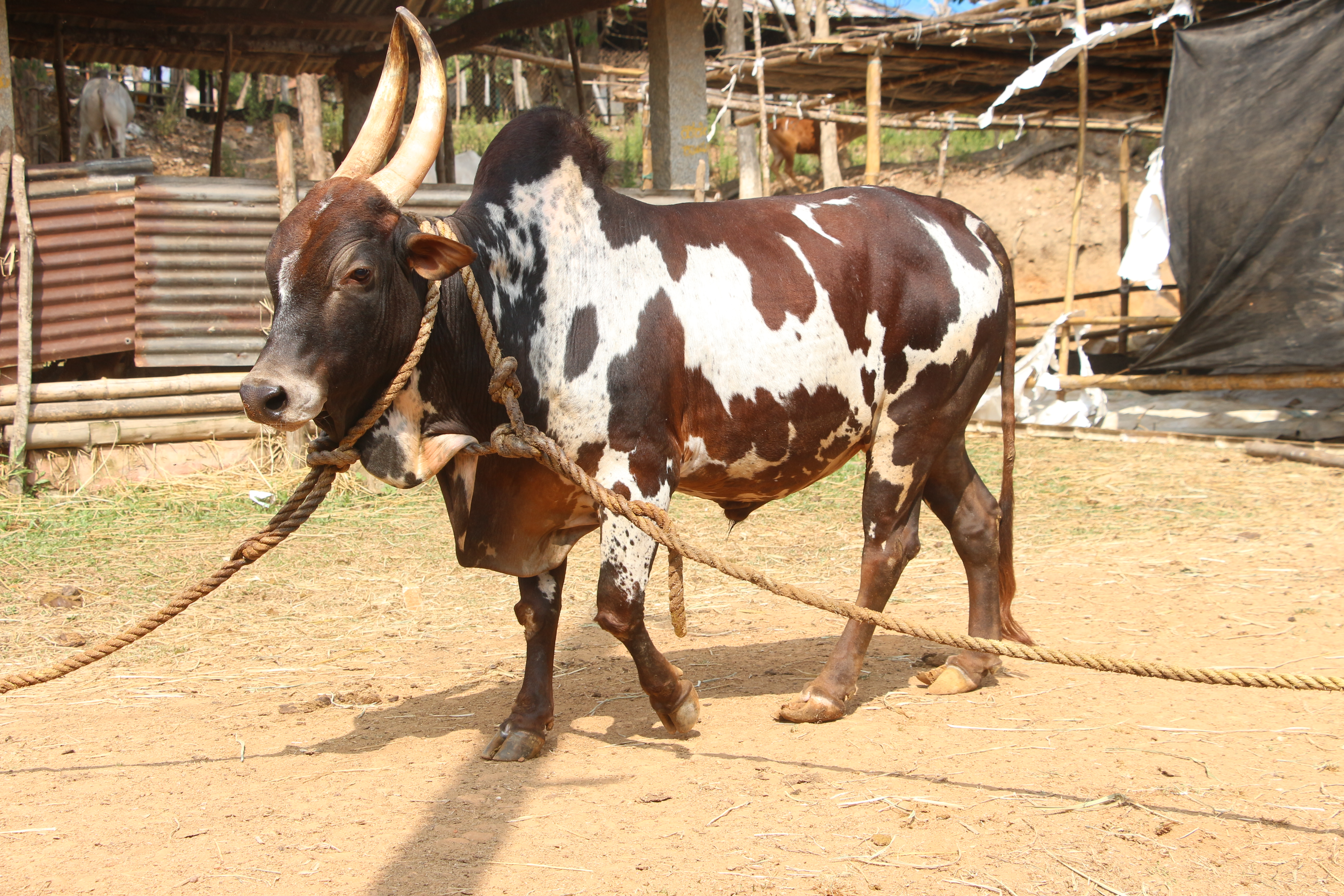
Bargur bull

Bargur (Tamil: பர்கூர் / Kannada: ಬರಗೂರು/Malayalam:ബർഗൂർ പശു) is a breed of cattle native to the Bargur forest hills in Anthiyur Taluk of Erode District in Western Tamil Nadu in India. The cattle are usually moderate and compact in build and have brown skin with white patches, though full white and brown complexions are sometimes found. They are known to be very aggressive and of fiery disposition, and hence difficult to train. Accustomed to forest hills of the rugged and inhospitable forests of the Western Ghats, they are best known for their endurance, speed and trotting ability. Their milk is thought to be of medicinal value. They have been usually reared in herds exclusively by the Kannada-speaking gowdas of the Bargur region.

== See also ==
- List of cattle breeds
