= Gangatiri =

Breed of cattle

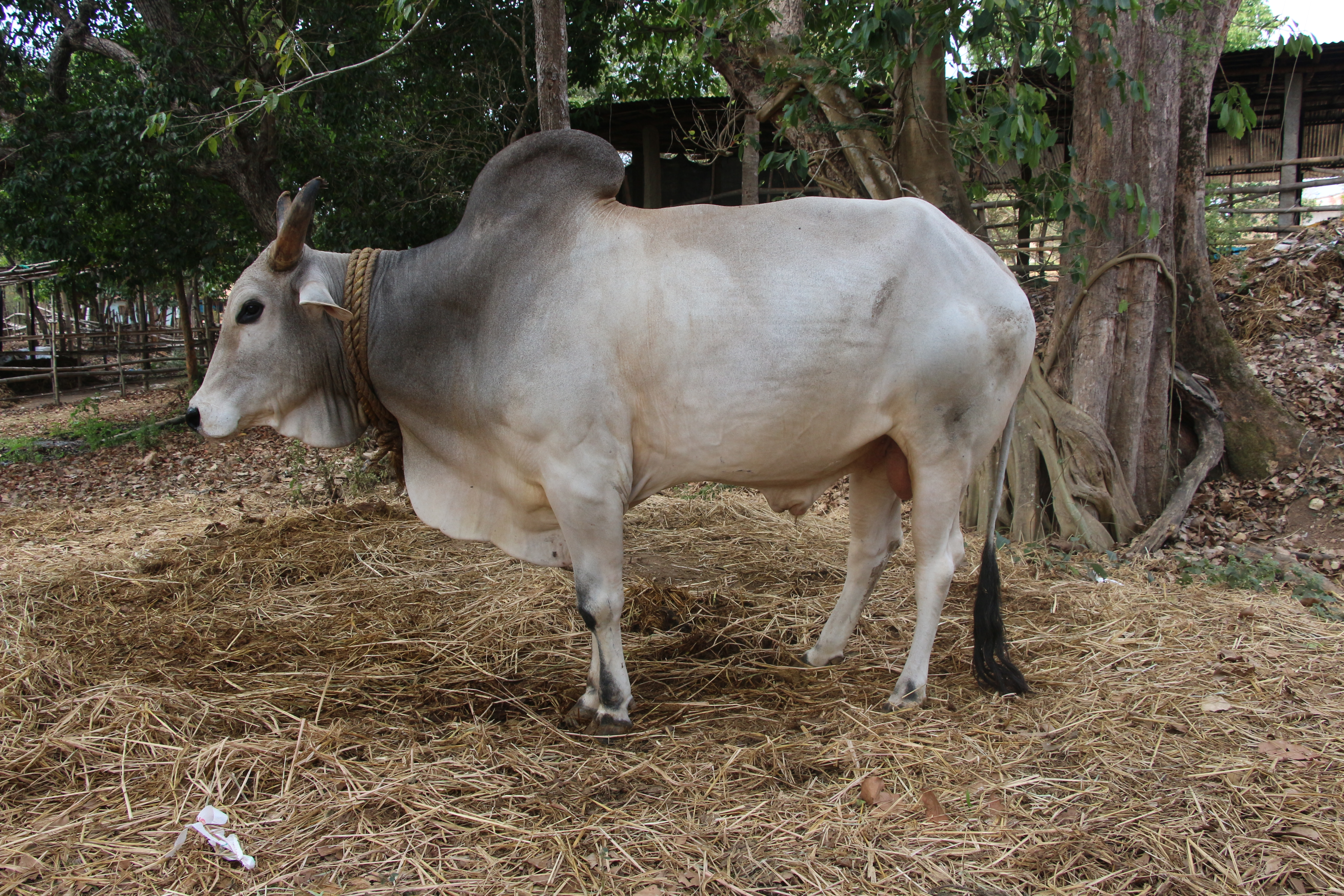
Gangatiri Bull

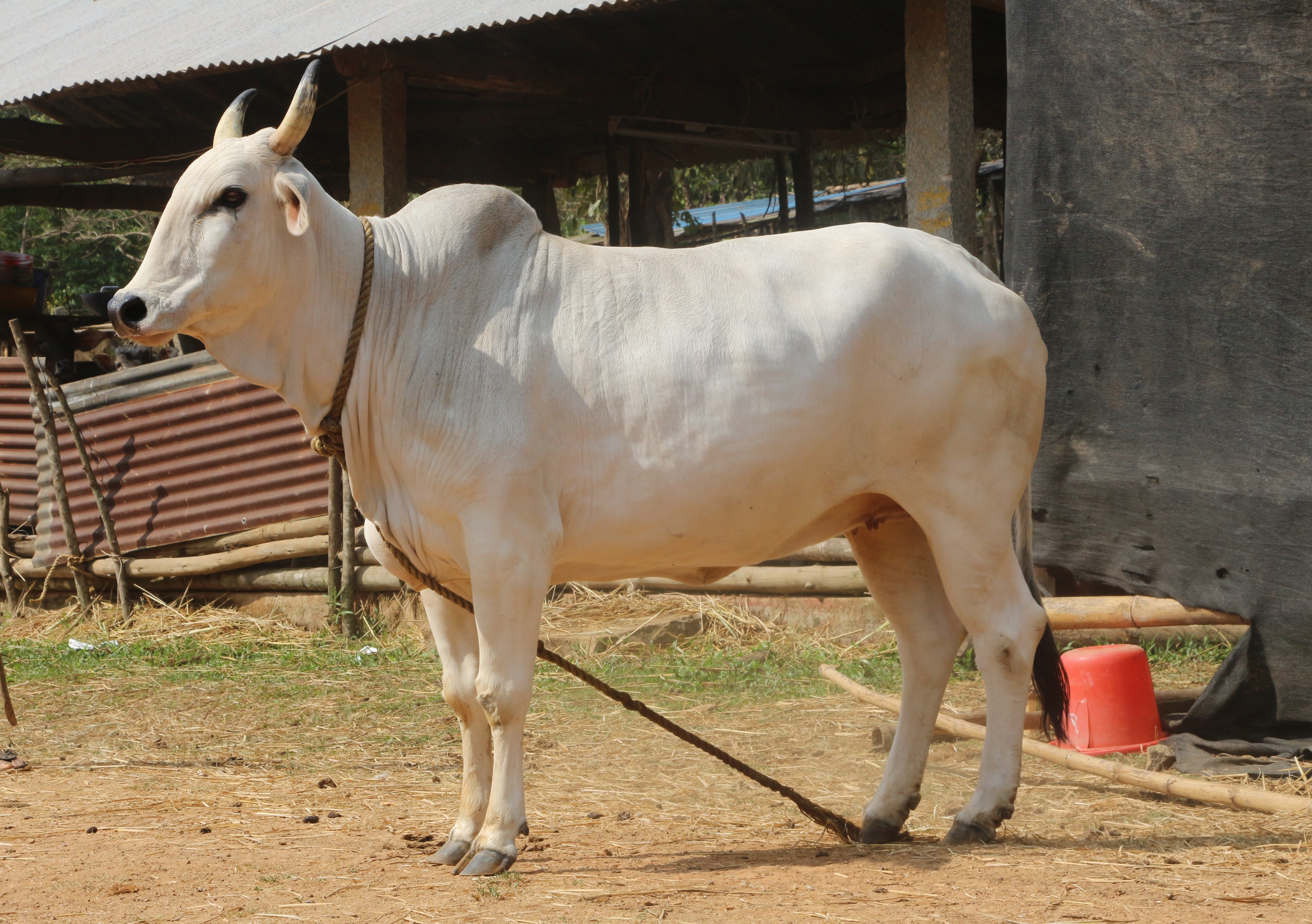
Gangatiri Cow

Gangatiri (Bhojpuri: 𑂏𑂁𑂏𑂰𑂞𑂱𑂩𑂲), also known as Eastern Hariana and Shahabadi, is an indigenous cattle breed of India. It is known to be originated in the region along the banks of Ganga river in eastern Uttar Pradesh and western parts of Bihar state. It is an important dual purpose breed of India and are fairly good milk yielders.

== See also ==
- List of breeds of cattle
