= Gaolao =

Breed of cattle

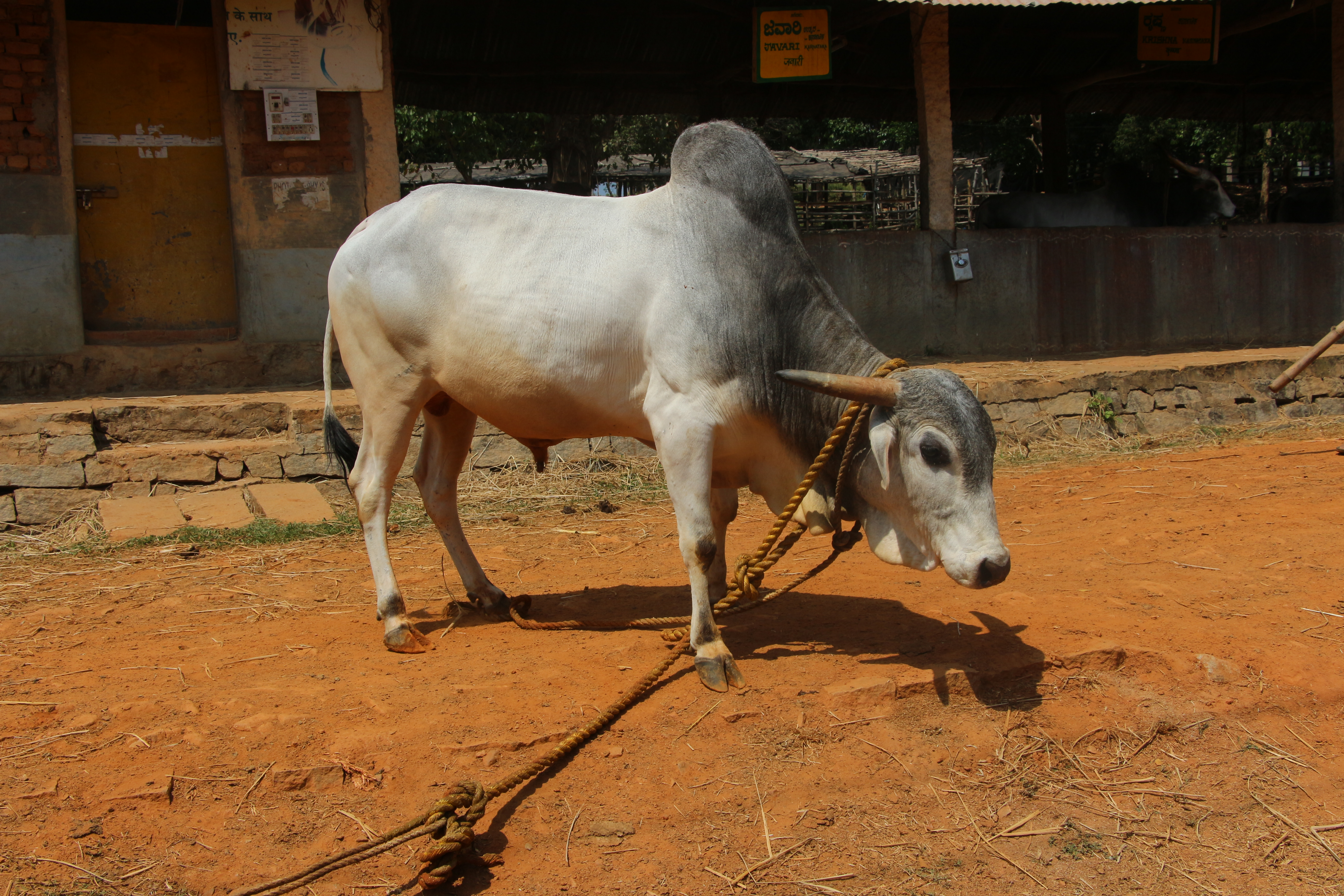
Gaolao Bull

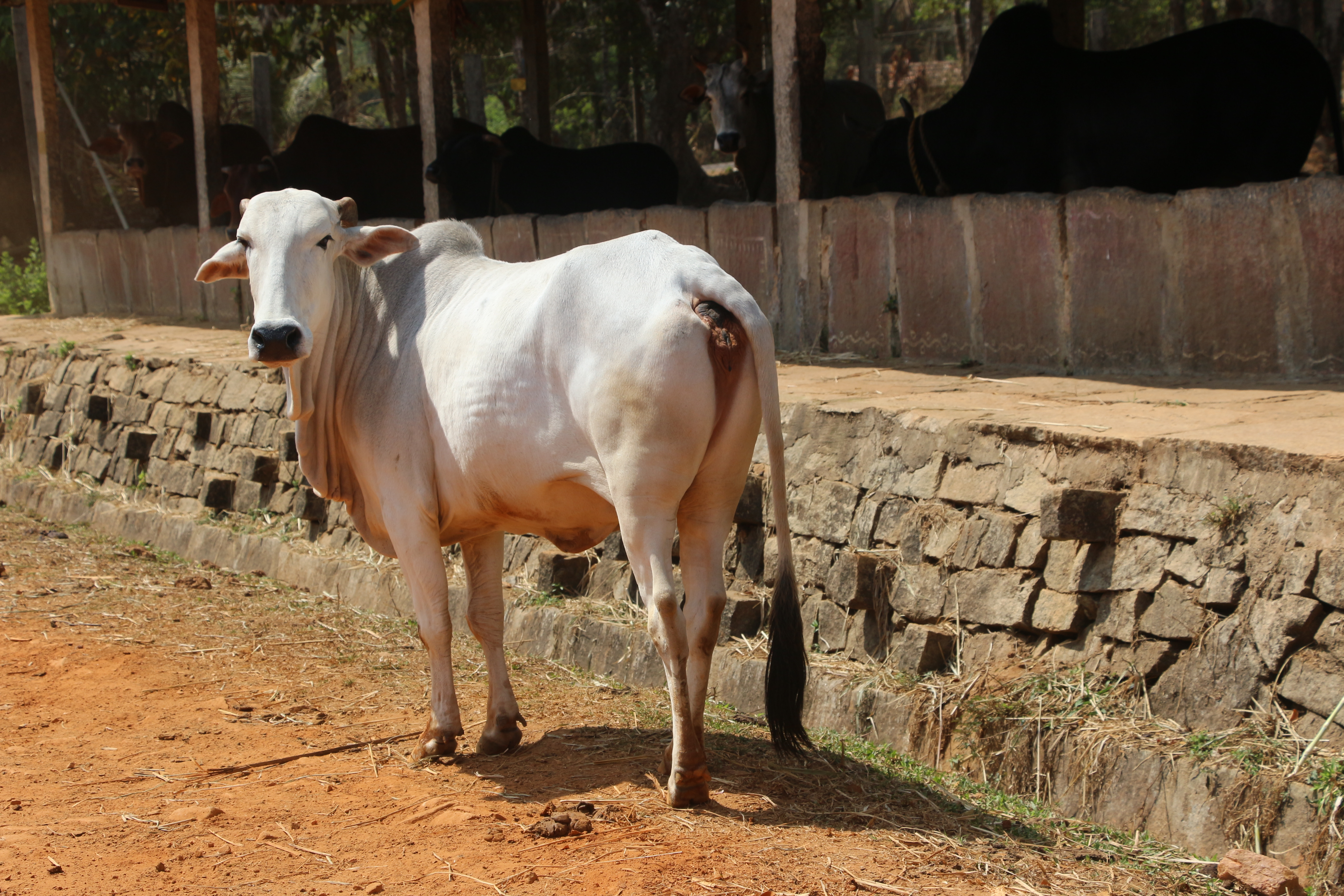
Gaolao Cow

Gaolao is a breed of cattle native to India. It belongs to the subspecies Bos Indicus. It is a dual purpose breed used both as draught and milk cattle. It originated in the region consisting of Wardha district in Maharashtra, Balaghat district and Chhindwara Districts in Madhya Pradesh and Rajnandgaon district in Chhattisgarh state. The cattle are large and well built in size, and usually are of white to gray complexions.

== See also ==
- List of breeds of cattle
