= Mongolian cattle =

Cattle breed

Mongolian cattle is a Mongolian indigenous cattle breed. The majority are found in Inner Mongolia. However, some exist in the northeast, north, and northwest. Coat colors range from brindle or reddish brown but occasionally can be seen in black, yellow, or pied. The cattle have two types: Ujumqin and Halhïn Gol. In 1949, Mongolian cattle began to be improved with crossbreeding to European breeds in limited numbers.

Mongolian cattle have been herded for centuries by nomads and are highly valued for their meat.

In 2008, 40,000 of the breed died due to harsh winter conditions.
