= Albera (cattle) =

Spanish breed of cattle

- Cow on the Col de l'Ouillat

- A young bull
- Conservation status: FAO (2007): endangered-maintained; DAD-IS (2026): at risk/endangered
- Other names: Albères; Massanaise
- Country of origin: Spain, France
- Distribution: Albera Massif
- Standard: Departamento de Agricultura, Ganadería, Pesca, Alimentación y Medio Natural (in Spanish)
- Use: meat, vegetation management

Traits
- Weight: Male: 350 kg; Female: 275 kg
- Height: Male: 126 cm; Female: 121 cm
- Coat: variable
- Horn status: small, half-moon-shaped
- Cattle; Bos (primigenius) taurus

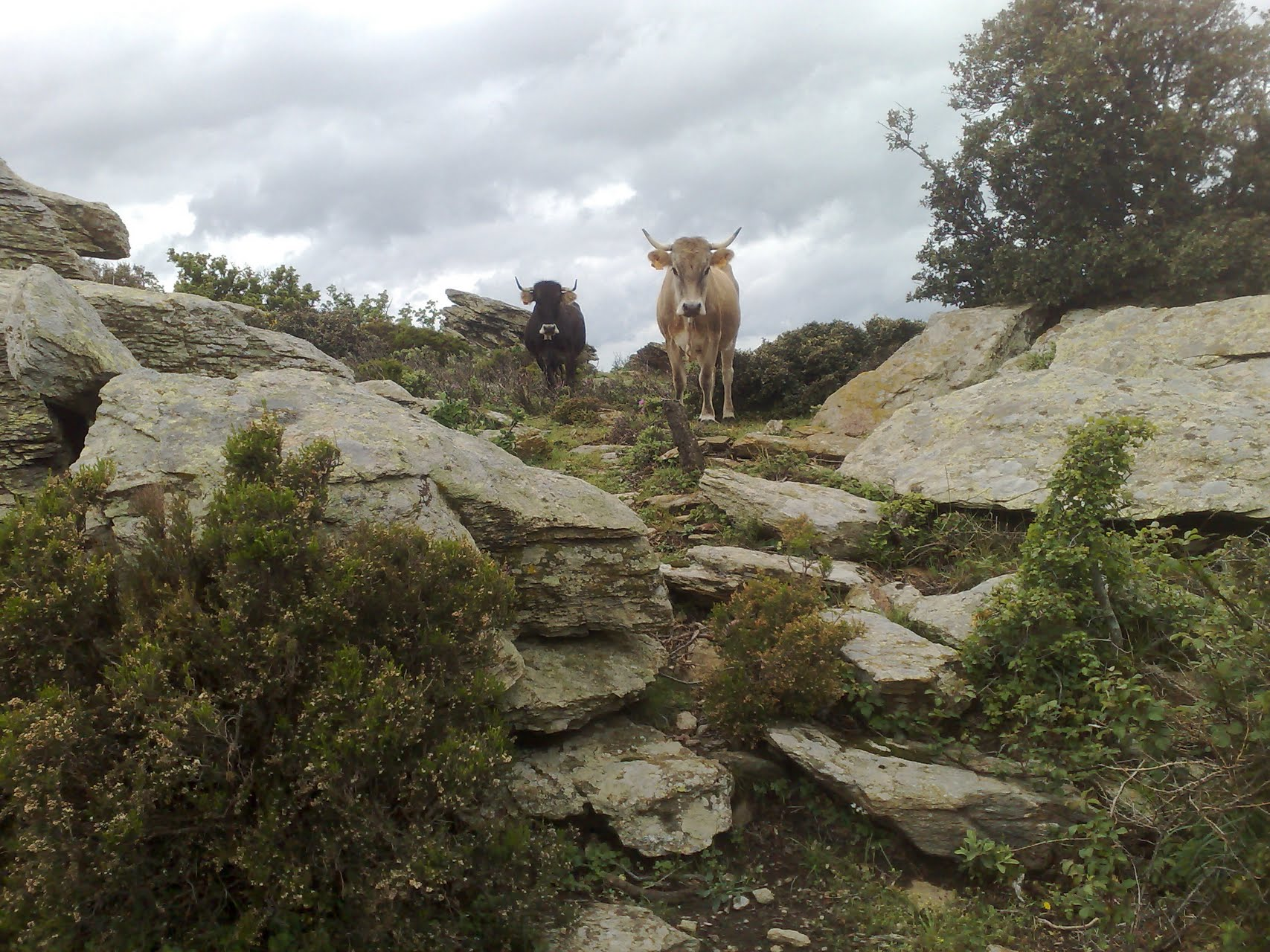
The two types, Albera Negra and Albera Fagina

The Albera is an endangered breed of small cattle indigenous to the Albera Massif, which divides Catalonia from France and lies partly in the comarca of Alt Empordà in the Catalan province of Girona, and partly in the comarca of Vallespir in the French département of Pyrénées-Orientales. The cattle are highly resistant to cold, though susceptible to heat, and are well adapted to the steep terrain of the massif.

== History ==
Although the presence of a cattle breed in the Albera Massif was noted in the nineteenth century, the first description of the Albera dates from 1957. At that time three sub-types were distinguished within the breed: a dark-coated type; a variable paler type; and a third type deriving from cross-breeding with Braunvieh stock. More recently, the types are considered to be two: the Negra, or dark type, and the Fagina, or paler type. In 1999 the Fagina type was found to be genetically closer to the Bruna de los Pirineos breed than to the Albera Negra type.

A breeders' association, the Associació de Ramaders de la Vaca de l'Albera, was founded in 2008. The Albera breed received official recognition on 27 July 2011; a breed standard was approved, and a herd-book established. At the end of 2014 the total population was recorded as 763, of which 618 were female and 145 male.

== Use and management ==
The Albera is highly resistant to cold, though susceptible to heat, and is well adapted to the steep terrain of the Albera Massif. The cattle are kept year-round in semi-feral conditions, at an altitude between 200 and 1000 m, foraging for food including the shoots and mast of the beech trees of the massif. They have little contact with man, and little productive capacity: cows calve every two years, and produce barely enough milk for the calf; the killing-out percentage is very low, of the order of 35%–40%. The cattle are used in vegetation management: by clearing undergrowth they help to prevent forest fires.
