= Red Bororo =

Breed of cattle

The Red Bororo is an African breed of cattle found from Mali across Niger and northern Nigeria to Chad and Cameroon.

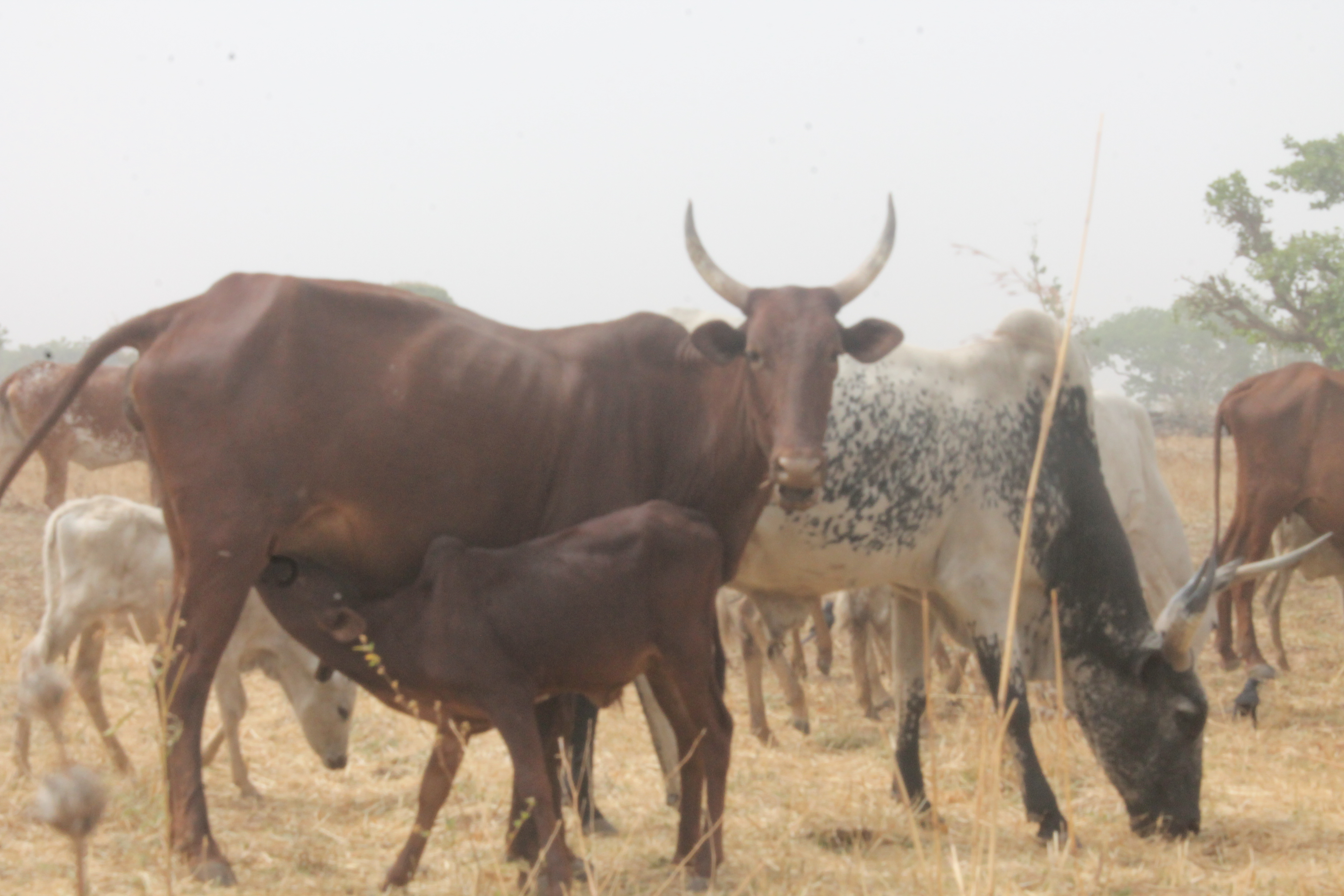
Fulani cattle in Abet, Zangon Kataf, Nigeria

== Characteristics ==
They are reddish-brown in colour with long lyre-shaped horns, and of the Sanga type, intermediate between Zebu and humpless cattle, with cervico-thoracic humps, though they appear more Zebu than most Sanga cattle. They are able to withstand heat, ticks, insect bites and scarcity of water and feed. Local names of the breed include Brahaza, Djafoun (Cameroon), Fellata (Chad and Ethiopia), Fogha, Gabassaé, Gadéhé, Hanagamba, Kréda (Chad), Mbororo, Rahaza, Red Fulani, Red Longhorn.

== Uses ==
The breed is used for milk and meat production by nomadic herders in the arid Sahel.
