= Abyssinian Shorthorned Zebu =

Ethiopian group of breeds of cattle

The Abyssinian Shorthorned Zebu or Ethiopian Highland Zebu is an Ethiopian breed or group of breeds of zebuine cattle. It is not reported to DAD-IS as a breed.

Breeds or strains of the Abyssinian Shorthorned Zebu include:

- the Adwa
- the Ambo
- the Arsi or Arusi
- the Bale
- the Goffa or Goffa Dwarf
- the Guraghe
- the Hammer
- the Harar
- the Jem-Jem or Black Highland Cattle
- the Jijiga
- the Mursi
- the Ogaden Zebu or Lowland Zebu
- the Smada.

Other breeds or types that may fall within this group include the Anniya, the Buche, the Dega, the Issa, the Jilbeguro, the Salea and the Sidamo.
