= Bestuzhev cattle =

Breed of cattle

The Bestuzhev (Russian: Бестужевская, romanized: Bestuzhevskaya) is a dual-purpose cattle breed from Uzbekistan created in the Soviet era by crossing the native Zebu cattle with Dutch Brown Swiss and Simmental bulls.

The breed shows resistance to bovine leukosis.
