= Buelingo =

American breed of cattle

- Country of origin: United States; Canada
- Use: beef

Traits
- Coat: red or black with white belt
- Cattle; Bos (primigenius) taurus

The Buelingo is a modern American composite breed of belted beef cattle, created in North Dakota, in the United States. It is named for Russ Bueling, who owned the foundation stock in the early 1970s.

== History ==
The Buelingo derives from a small herd of fourteen cows of mostly Shorthorn type owned by Russ Bueling in the early 1970s. A dairy-type Dutch Belted bull was used on these to introduce the gene for belting (this was purely for appearance), and then a Chianina bull was used to increase size and improve beef qualities. A breed society, the Buelingo Beef Cattle Society, was started in 1989, and a herd-book was begun in the same year. In 2012, new registrations of calves in the herd-book were 308; just over 8000 animals had been registered since the book was started.

It was not among the American cattle breeds for which the conservation status was listed by the Food and Agriculture Organization of the United Nations in 2007. In 2022 it was not among the breeds reported to DAD-IS by the National Animal Germplasm Program of the United States Department of Agriculture.

== Characteristics ==
The Buelingo is a large beef animal. It may be either black or red, the body encircled by a broad white belt. Bulls without the belt are barred from registration; unbelted cows may be registered in an appendix of the herd-book.
