= Dangi cattle =

Cattle breed

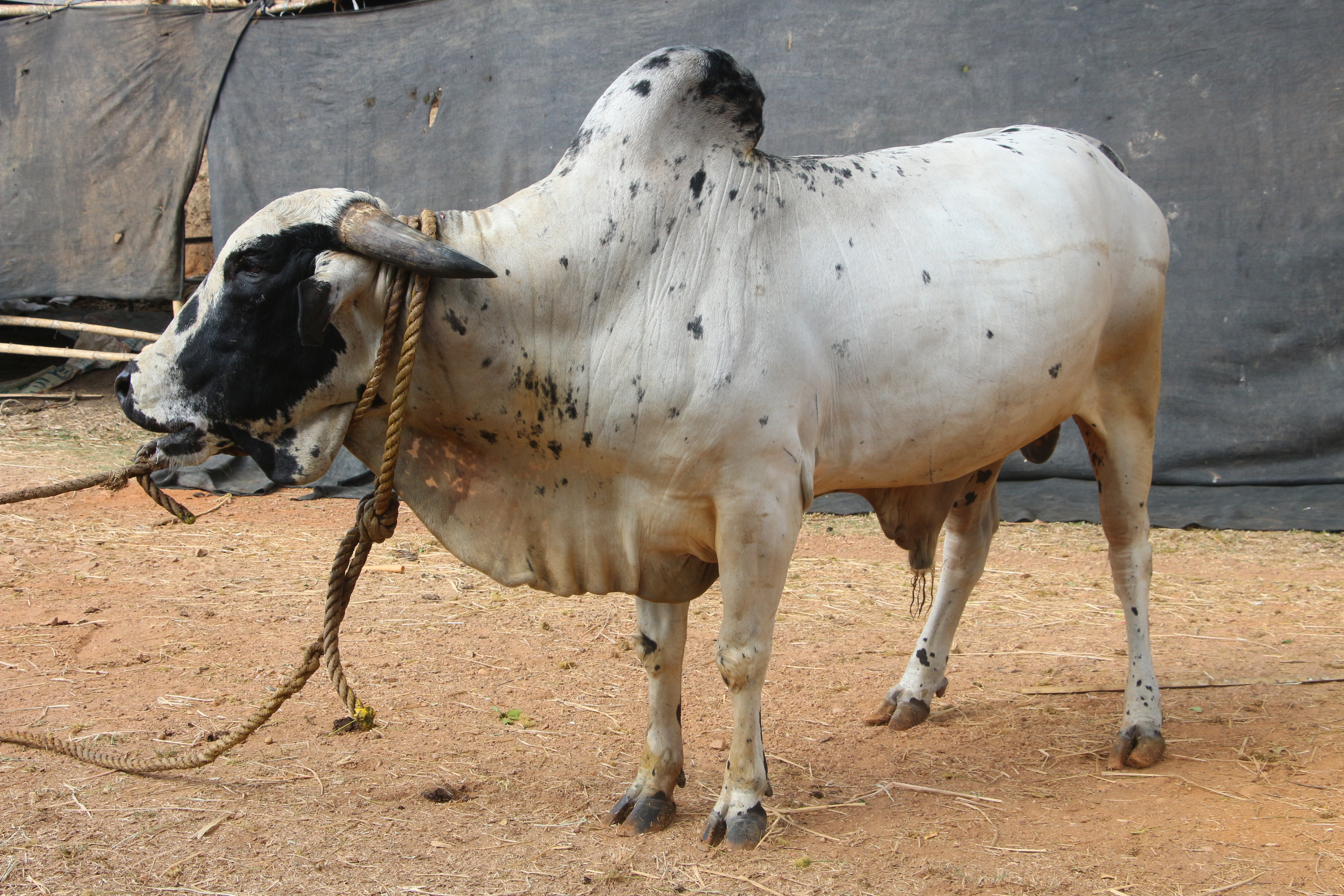
Dangi Bull

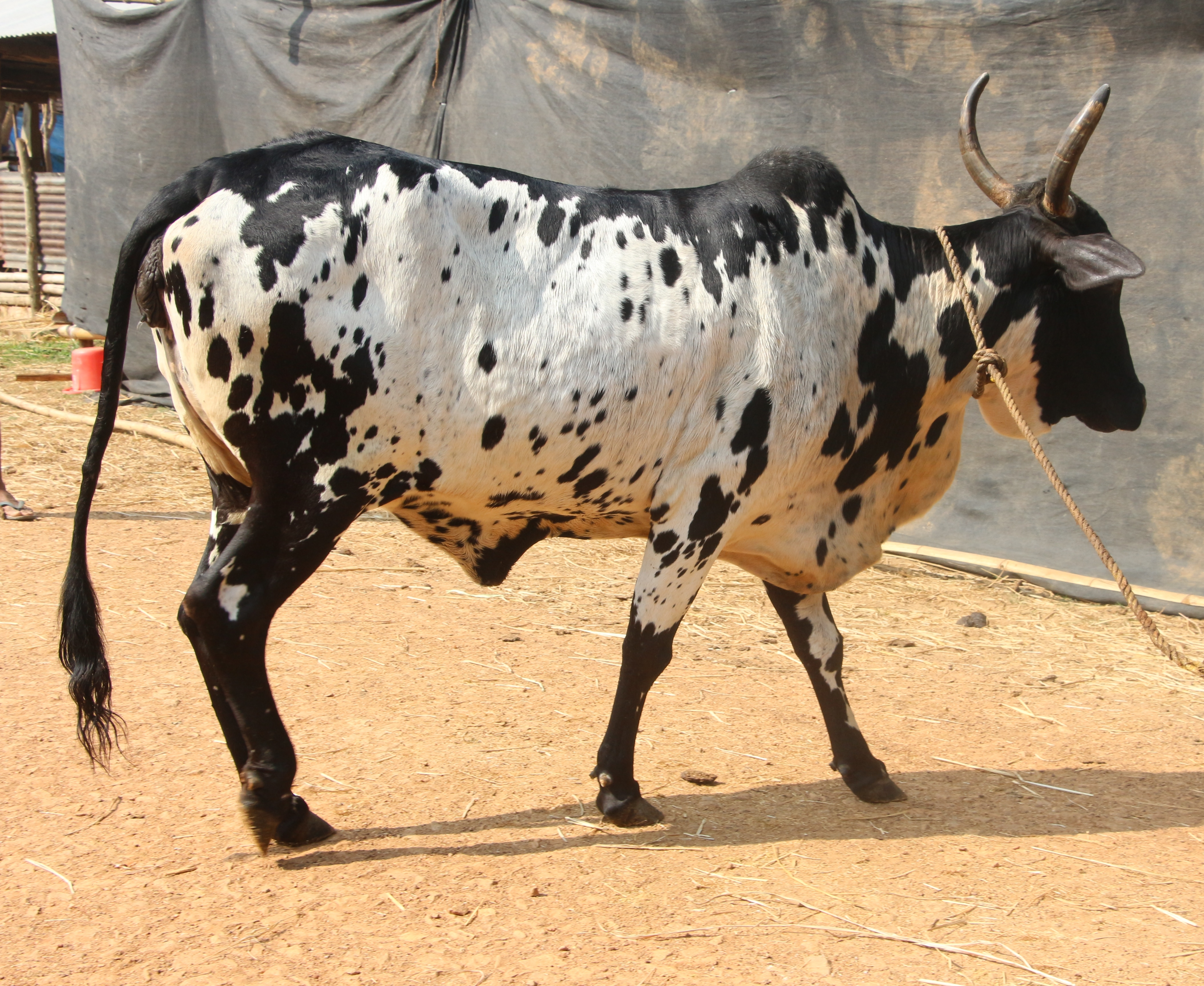
Dangi Cow

Dangi (Marathi:डांगी) is an indigenous cattle breed of India. It originated in the hilly tracts of Dangs comprising the Nasik and Ahmednagar districts in the state of Maharashtra. The breed is medium to large in body size. They are a very good draught breed and known for their adaptability to heavy rainfall areas. The skin of this breed secretes an oil element that enables them to tolerate heavy rains.

== See also ==
- List of breeds of cattle
