= Finnish Ayrshire =

Finnish breed of cattle

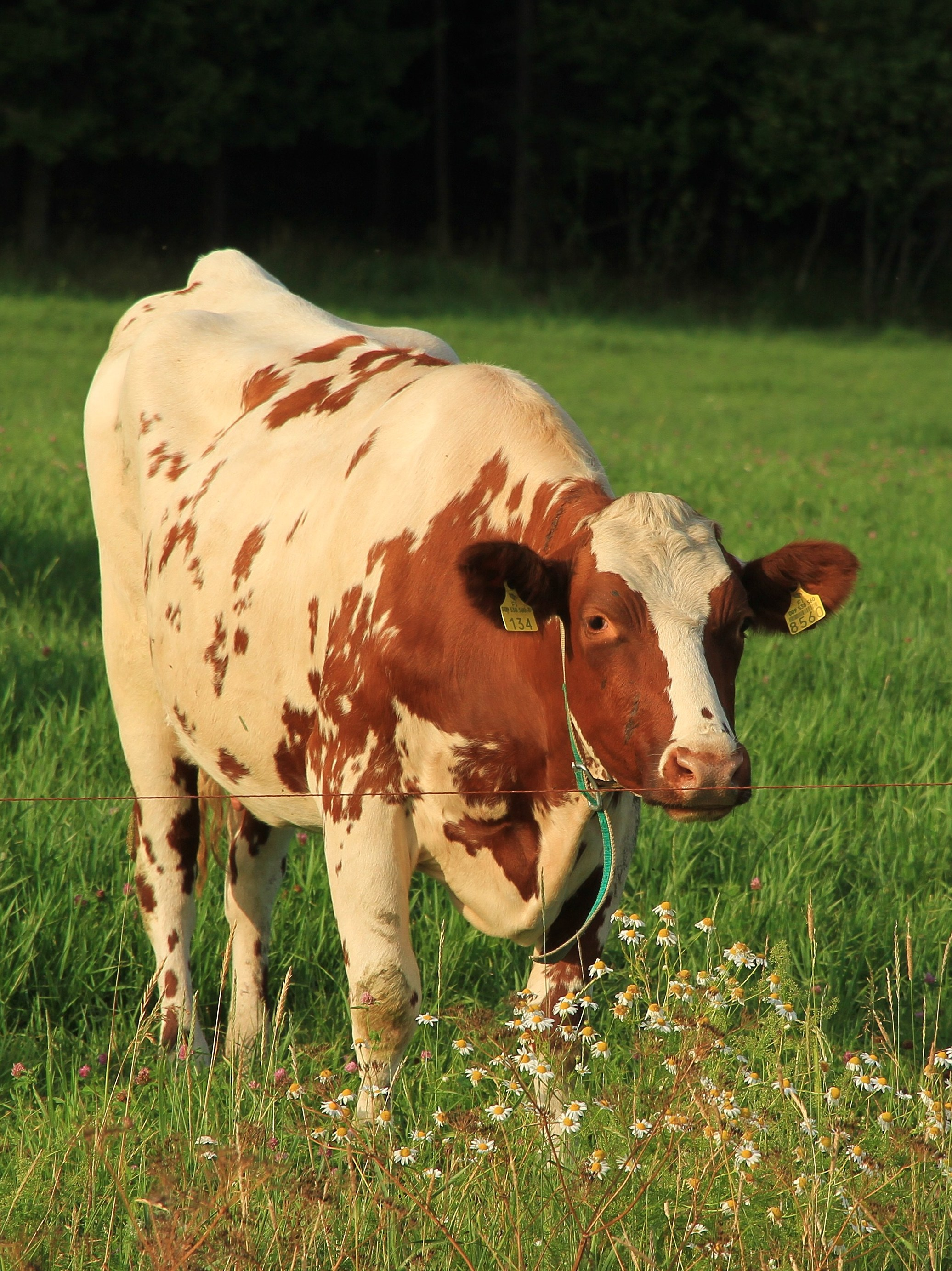
- Conservation status: FAO (2007): not at risk; DAD-IS (2021): not at risk
- Other names: Suomen Ayrshire
- Country of origin: Finland
- Use: milk

Traits
- Weight: average 593 kg; Male: 1000 kg; Female: 580 kg
- Height: Male: 140 cm; Female: 127 cm
- Coat: multi-coloured red and white

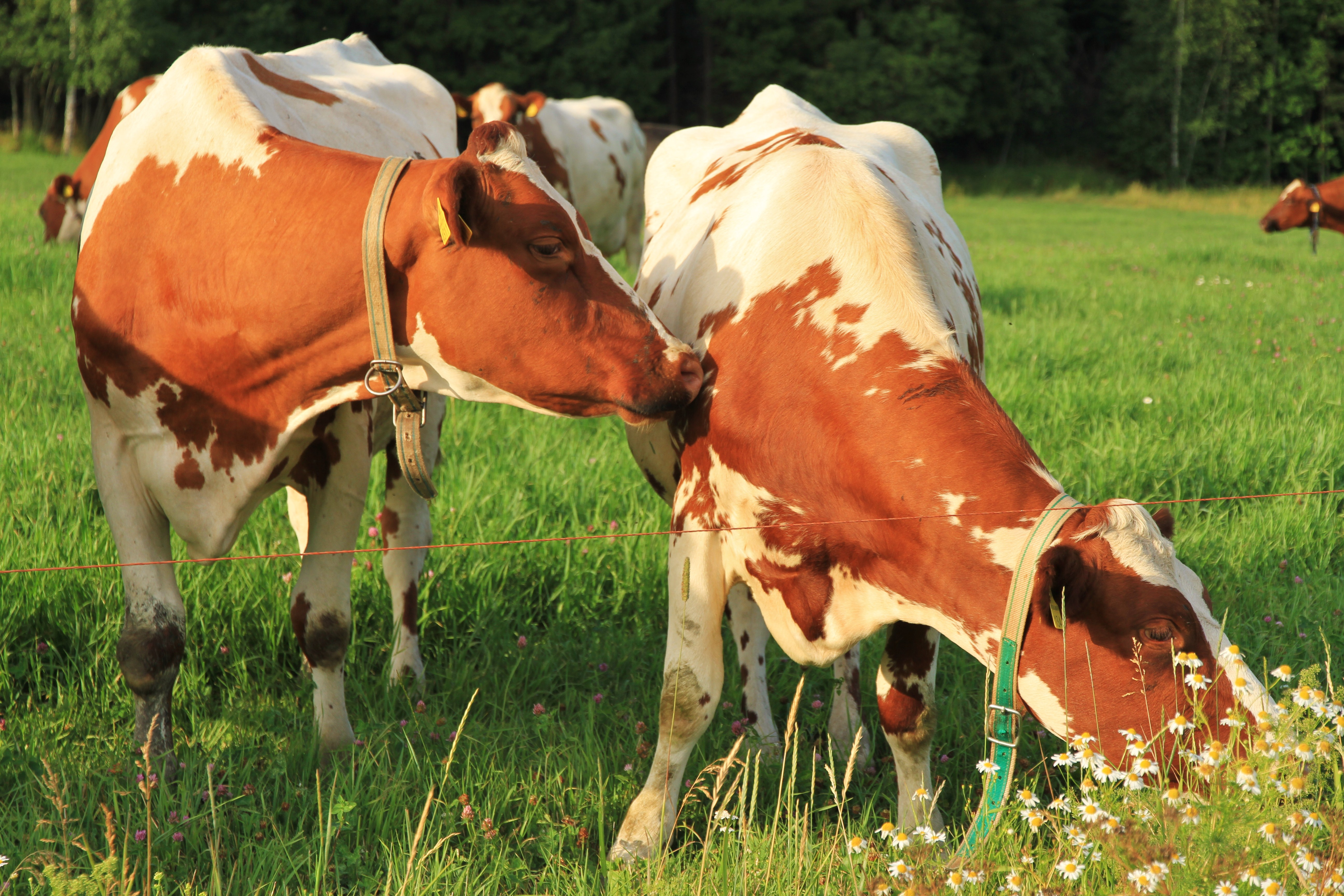
Polled cows with ear-tags

The Finnish Ayrshire is a Finnish breed of dairy cattle. It derives from Scottish Ayrshire stock imported to Finland between about 1847 and 1923. It is the most numerous dairy breed of the country, constituting approximately 61% of the dairy herd.

== History ==
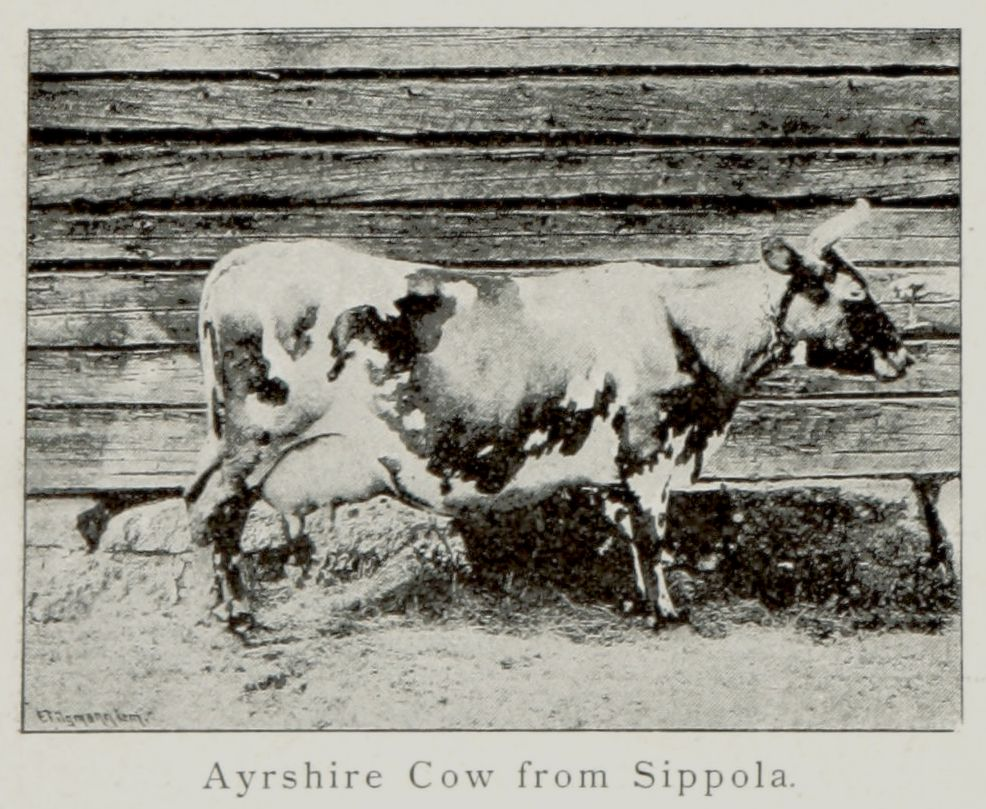
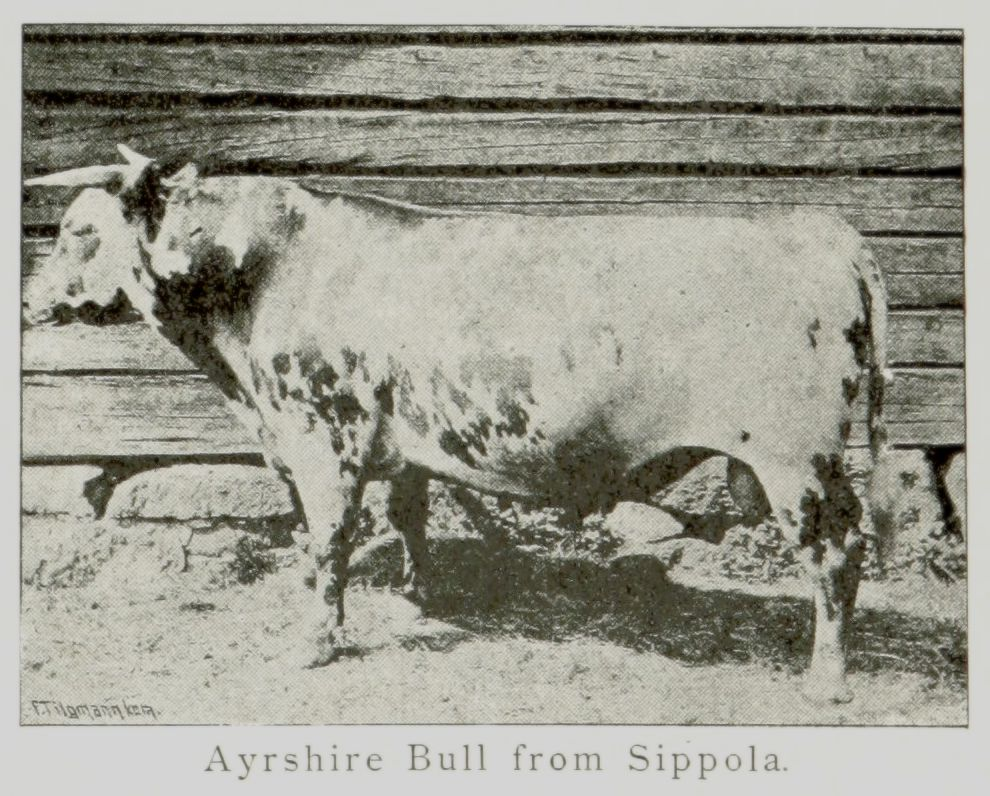
Ayrshire cow and bull photographed in Sippola in 1894.

A breed society, the Afvelsföreningen för Ayrshire-boskap i Finland, was formed in 1901; a herd-book was started in the same year.

In the 1960s and 1970s Finnish Ayrshire semen was used to improve the dairy capabilities of the Ayrshire in the United Kingdom.

Its conservation status was given as "not at risk" by the Food and Agriculture Organization of the United Nations in 2007 and by DAD-IS in 2021.

== Characteristics ==
The cattle are multi-coloured red and white.

== Use ==
The cattle are reared for their milk. The average milk yield per lactation is 8571 kg, with 4.28% fat.
