= Danish Jersey =

Danish breed of cattle

- Conservation status: FAO (2007): not listed; DAD-IS (2022): not at risk
- Other names: Dansk Jersey
- Country of origin: Denmark
- Use: dairy

Traits
- Weight: Male: average 750 kg; Female: average 450 kg
- Height: Male: average 134 cm; Female: average 124 cm
- Skin colour: often pigmented (black)
- Coat: variable: grey or fawn in various shades, solid-coloured or broken-coloured
- Horn status: horned in both sexes
- Cattle; Bos (primigenius) taurus

At Kalø Slot, near Aarhus

The Danish Jersey or Dansk Jersey is a modern Danish breed of dairy cattle. It derives from Jersey stock from the island of Jersey in the Channel Islands, of which approximately 5200 head were imported to Denmark between about 1896 and 1909. It is the most numerous population of Jersey cattle in Europe and constitutes approximately 13% of the Danish dairy herd.

== History ==
The Danish Jersey derives from Jersey stock from the island of Jersey in the Channel Islands, of which approximately 5200 head were imported to Denmark between about 1896 and 1909. At first the cattle were bred principally on the island of Fünen. A breed society – the Danmarks Jerseyforening – was formed in 1902, and a herd-book started in 1911, in 1918 or in 1925.

In the twenty-first century approximately one third of its genome is attributable to the American Jersey, bulls of which were first imported in the 1960s and have since come to be extensively used. For calves born in the five years from 1999 to 2003, approximately 55% of genetic inheritance was from American bulls. In the 1980s there also some introgression from the New Zealand Jersey.

== Characteristics ==
The Danish Jersey is larger and heavier than the original Channel Island stock: body weights vary from about 350 to 450 kg for cows and 550 to 850 kg for bulls; the height at the withers usually falls between 126 and 132 cm for cows and 135 and 140 cm for bulls. Coat colours are similar to those of the original island breed: usually fawn or grey in various shades, but highly variable. Both solid-coloured and broken-coloured coats occur; the head, shoulders and hips are commonly darker than the rest of the body. The skin, tail switch and tongue are often pigmented (black).

== Use ==
The Danish Jersey is a dairy breed, reared principally for its milk, which has a high content of both butter-fat and milk protein. The average milk yield per lactation recorded in 2023 for 72120 of the cows was 7626 kg, of which 6.00% was butter-fat and 4.35% was protein.
