= Philippine Native =

Philippine breed of cattle

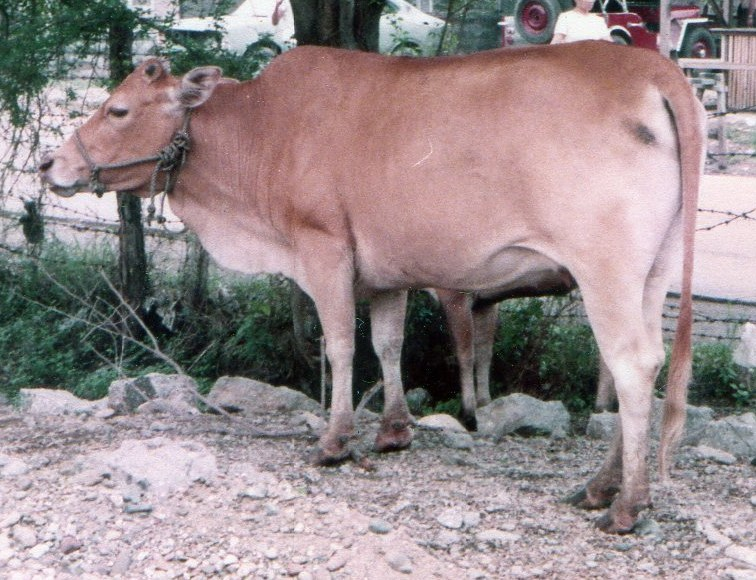

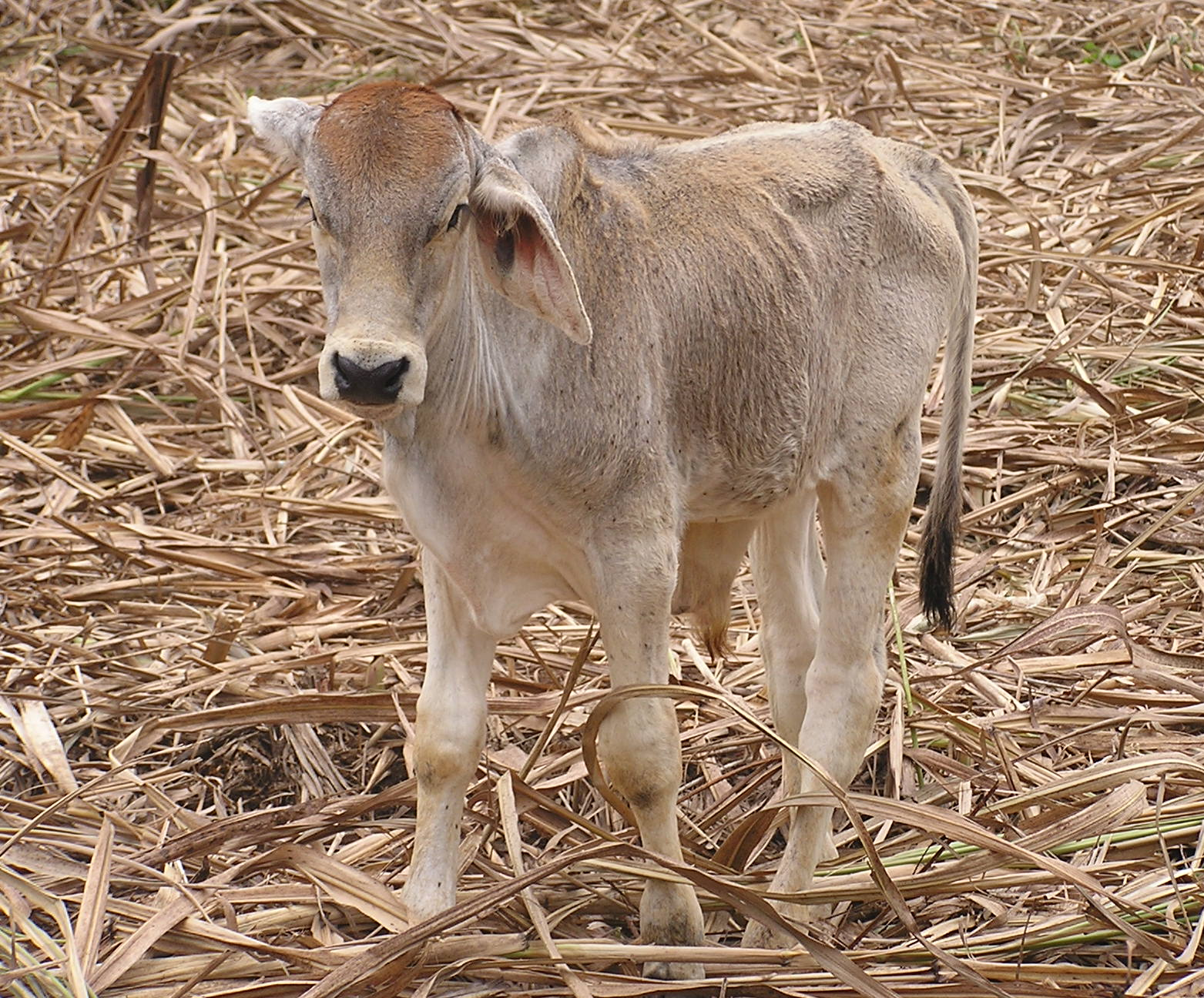
- A calf
- Conservation status: FAO (2007): not at risk; DAD-IS (2025): unknown
- Country of origin: Philippines

The Philippine Native (or Philippine cattle) is an indigenous breed or group of breeds of cattle of the Philippines. It is one of six local breeds reported to the DAD-IS database of the Food and Agriculture Organization of the United Nations; the others are the Batanes Black, the Batangas, the Ilocos (small and large types), the Iloilo and the Philamin, which is extinct.

It is a small breed with mature bulls weighing about 400 kg and mature cows weighing about 300 kg. The color ranges from grey to brown to fawn, with white spotting on some animals. The females are humpless, while males have a low hump. The breed is used for draught work and milk and beef production, although the carabao is often preferred for draught work.

Four breed types have been recognized:

• Ilocos (northwestern Luzon)

• Batangas (southwestern Luzon)

• Iloilo (Panay Island)

• Batanes Black (the Batanes Islands between Luzon and Taiwan).
