= Javari cattle =

Breed of cattle

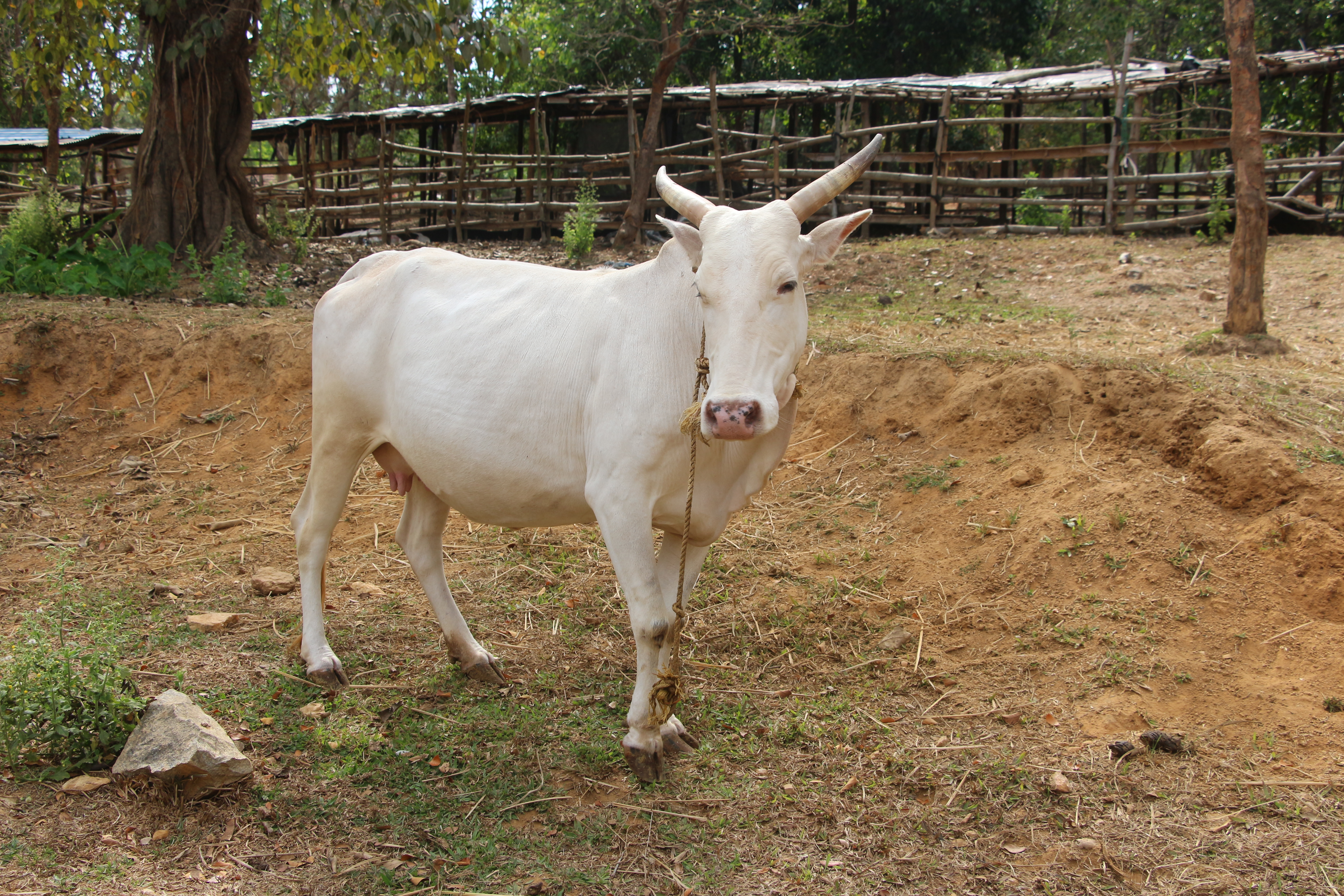
Javari cow

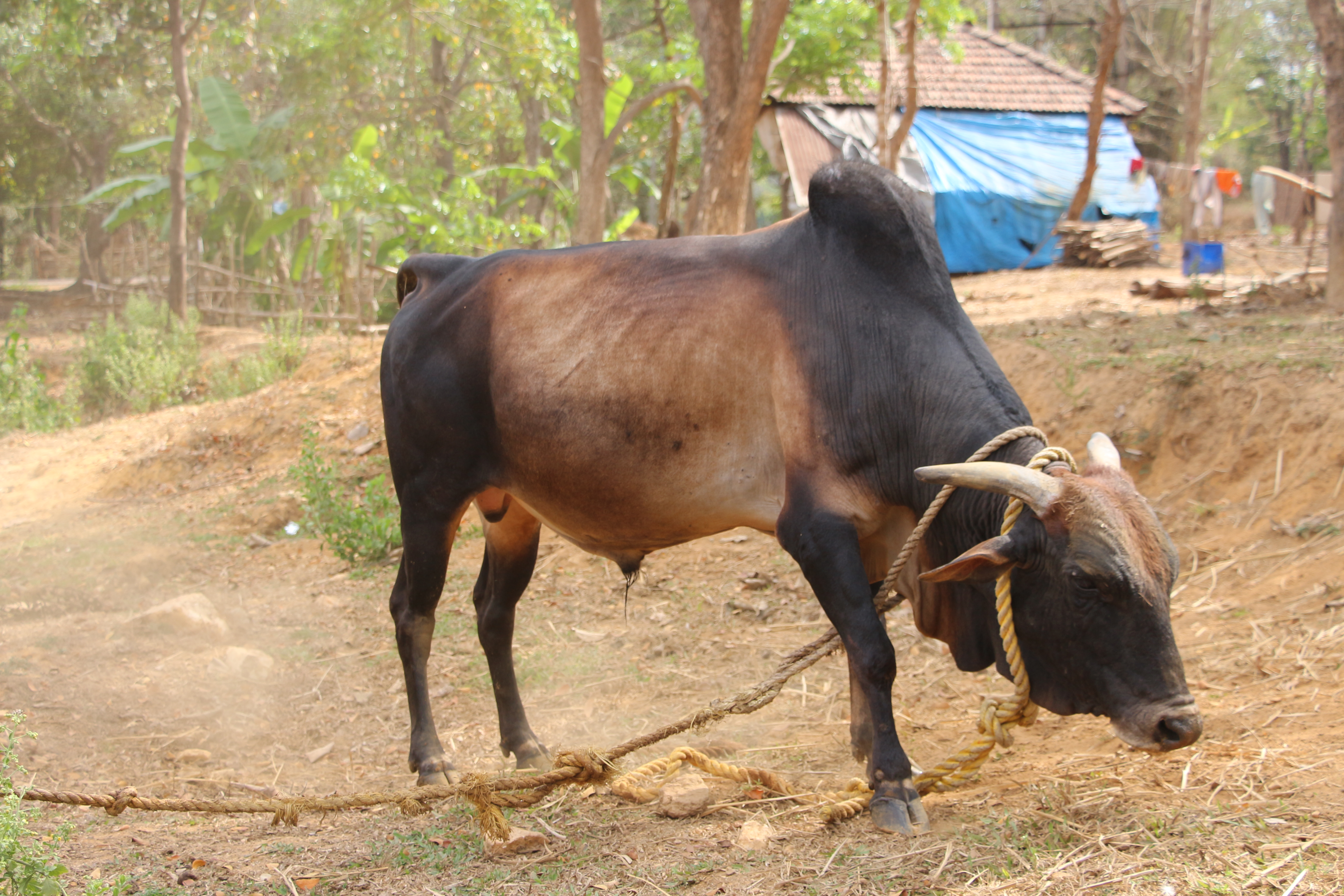
Javari bull

Javari (Kannada: ಜವಾರಿ) is a breed of cattle native to Kalyana-Karnataka region in the state of Karnataka, India. It is considered as a dual purpose breed with good milking and draught capability. The cattle is of medium build and are of gentle temperament. They are known to have good heat and pest resistance, and is the most sought-after breed in its native region.

== See also ==
- List of breeds of cattle
