= Siboney de Cuba =

Cuban breed of cattle

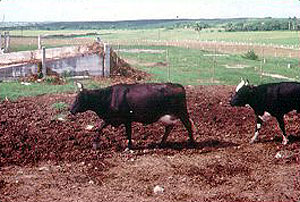
- Conservation status: FAO (2007): endangered; DAD-IS (2024): unknown
- Other names: Siboney
- Country of origin: Cuba
- Distribution: Cuba; Colombia

The Siboney de Cuba is a Cuban breed of dairy cattle. It was developed from the 1960s through cross-breeding of Holstein Friesian and zebu stock, with a final genetic contribution of 5/8 from the former and 3/8 from the latter. It is one of several Cuban dairy hybrids of European (taurine) and zebuine cattle; others are the Mambi de Cuba (3/4 Holstein-Friesian, 1/4 zebu) and the Caribe (5/8 Holstein-Friesian, 3/8 Santa Gertrudis), which are grouped with the Siboney under the name Cebú Lechero.

In 2003 the Siboney was the principal dairy breed of Cuba.

== History ==
The Siboney was developed from the 1960s to improve the milk yields of the hardy but poor yielding zebu by incorporating genes from the more productive but also more frail Holstein.

== Use ==
A milk yield of 2897 kg per lactation was reported for the Siboney in 1995.
