= Balancer =

Breed of cattle

Balancer are a hybrid breed of beef cattle, a combination of Gelbvieh and Angus. These cattle are bred for their hybrid vigour, resulting in a higher growth rate and better quality meat.
