= Brown Carpathian cattle =

Breed of cattle

The Brown Carpathian (Ukrainian: бypa кapпaтськa) is a breed of cattle from Western Ukraine. Found in the Trans-Carpathian region of Ukraine, the breed was the result of crossing Brown Swiss with the local cattle to produce a dual-purpose breed for dairy and beef production. The breed was first recognized in 1972, and since the 1980s there have been further crossings with Brown Swiss and Jersey bulls.
