= Red Mingrelian =

Breed of cattle

Red Mingrelian cattle (Georgian: მეგრული წითელი ჯიში, Tsit'eli megruli jishi) are a local cattle breed from western Georgia. They are used for milk and beef production

== Characteristics ==
The coat colour is various shades of red, brown and grey. They have a compact conformation and have horns. Cows average 115 cm in height at the withers and 300 kg in weight. Bulls average 124 cm in height and 450 kg in weight. The cattle are reputed to be adapted to living on wet ground in winter and high mountain pastures in summer. Milk yields are low, but the milk has a very high fat content.

== Population ==
In 1980 there were estimated to be 7000 breeding females, but by 1990 this had fallen to less than 1000.
