= Baoulé cattle =

Breed of cattle

The Baoule (also known as Lobi or Mere) is a breed of Savannah Shorthorn cattle found in north and central Ivory Coast and the southern tip of Mali. They are found in pure form in Bouaké, Bouna, and Dabakala. They are mostly kept by Fula herdsmen. They are dwarf animals with cows being 90–100 cm, and bulls being 100–110 cm. They have a massive head and short, stout horns with a short neck that is thin in cows and heavy in bulls. Their bodies are well rounded with a straight back-line. The tail-head is high and thick, and their coat color varies from mostly black to black pied. They produce 120–390 kg of milk in a lactation period lasting 280–340 days. The dressing percentage of a Baoule carcass is 50%. There were 350,000 of them in 1985.
