= Latvian Danish Red =

Breed of cattle

Latvian Danish red cattle (Latvian: Dānijas sarkanā) are a rare Latvian breed of cattle. These cattle are descendants of the Danish Red Cattle.

Latvian Danish red cattle are used in both beef and dairy production.
