= Lucerna (play) =

1905 play by Alois Jirásek

- Original language: Czech
- Written by: Alois Jirásek
- Genre: Fairy tale

Premiere
- Date: 17 November 1905
- Place: National Theatre, Prague

Eduard Vojan as the miller in Lucerna (National Theatre, 1905)

Lucerna is a Czech fairy-tale play in four acts, written by Alois Jirásek in 1905. It premiered on 17 November 1905 at the National Theatre in Prague.

== Plot summary ==
Libor, a miller, lives in his mill with his grandmother and foster daughter Hanka. A waterman, Michal, who lives nearby, is in love with Hanka.
