= Andalusian Black cattle =

Breed of cattle

Andalusian Black
- Conservation status: Endangered
- Other names: Negra de las Campiñas, Negra Campiñesa
- Country of origin: Spain
- Distribution: Andalusia
- Use: Beef

Traits
- Weight: Male: 875-950kg; Female: 600-650kg
- Height: Male: 140cm; Female: 135cm
- Coat: Black
- Horn status: Horned
- Cattle; Bos (primigenius) taurus

The Andalusian Black (Spanish: Negra Andaluza), known locally as the Negra de las Campiñas, is a taurine breed of cattle that originated in west Andalusia, Spain. They are similar to the Avileña-Black Iberian breed, however the two are distinguished geographically.

Andalusian Blacks are found in two main areas of west Andalusia: from Cordova to the foothills of the Sierra Morena; and in the provinces of Seville, Cádiz and Huelva.

The first breed association was formed in Spain in 1996. There were only ~800 purebred individuals in 2007, their numbers reduced due to crossbreeding with other local Spanish breeds; the population increased to 1,883 by 2011. It is now classified as endangered, with 1,415 animals registered with the stud book. The breed's decline is due to mechanisation of agriculture, segmentation and isolation of subpopulations, crossbreeding, lack of genetic programs, and unstructured breeding efforts. The current breed association, formed in 2005, has undertaken a conservation program in partnership with the University of Cordoba to maintain the breed.

They are a strong, hardy breed that is able to adapt to adverse weather conditions. The head can be straight to convex in profile. They have long, upward-curving horns. Females grow to 135cm at the withers and weigh 600-650kg. Males grow to 140cm at the withers and weigh 875-950kg. The coat colour is black. They have a calm and docile nature.

Heifers reach sexual maturity between 18-20 months. They have a fertility rate of 80-95%, with a 1.15% chance of producing twins. They have a strong maternal instinct.

A genetic defect common to the Andalusian breeds resulting in lowered fertility rate is present in Andalusian Blacks, however it likely occurs at a lower frequency within this breed compared to the others. They are prone to developing hypermetria.

The breed was traditionally used as a draught animal, however it is now transitioning into a primarily beef breed due to the mechanisation of agriculture. They are also crossed with other breeds to produce beef. They are often kept on unimproved farms with rudimentary infrastructure.
