= Horro (cattle) =

Breed of cattle

Horro cattle
- Conservation status: FAO (2006): not at risk
- Other names: Wallega; Wollega
- Country of origin: Ethiopia
- Distribution: Western highlands
- Use: Draught, dairy, meat

Traits
- Coat: Brown

Horro, Wallega or Wollega cattle are a breed of cattle native to the Horo Guduru Welega Zone of western Ethiopia. They are mainly used as draught animals and dairy production; other uses include manure and threshing crops.

== Characteristics ==
Horro cattle are usually uniform in type, having a brown coat and a medium to large fatty hump at the shoulders.

In 2007, the population of cattle in the Horro district was estimated to be around 47,700; in 2006, DAD-IS reported that the Horro cattle is not at risk of "genetic erosion."

While the milk produced by the Horro cattle is safe to consume, it is generally above acceptable acidity levels, as well as having poor bacteriological quality.

=== Breeding and fertility ===
Most cattle are used jointly for mating and as draught animals, although breeders may exclusively keep breeding bulls and sires in a herd. Culling generally happens when a bull is around seven years old and a sire is around thirteen. Reasons for culling include a cow reaching old age, a failure or decline in reproductive success, health issues, or the need for the owners of the cattle to sell or slaughter the cow.

Breeding among cattle owned by farmers is mostly natural and unplanned, with communal grazing being the main source of breeding. Overgrazing, overpopulation, and the encroachment of crop fields have led to a decrease in land suitable for communal grazing, creating a lack of communal interaction that can lead to breeding and a lack of pasture suitable for feeding.

=== Health ===
Livestock diseases caused by factors such as parasitism, bloating, foot-and-mouth disease and pasteurellosis have been noted to cause livestock deaths. A majority of farmers use a combination of veterinary services and indigenous medicinal practices to treat diseases among livestock.
