= Preta cattle =

Breed of cattle

Preta is a cattle breed from Portugal.

== Description ==
- Colour - uniformly black
- Muzzle - pigmented
- Profile - upright
- Horns - high curved

== Extension ==
The breed region is circumscribed almost exclusively to the Southern Portugal in the Upper Alentejo Region.
