= Selembu =

Breed of cattle

Selembu is a dual purpose dairy and beef breed of cattle. It is the result of gaur/zebu hybridisation. The name is a hybrid from Malay name of Seladang (gaur) and Lembu (Cow).

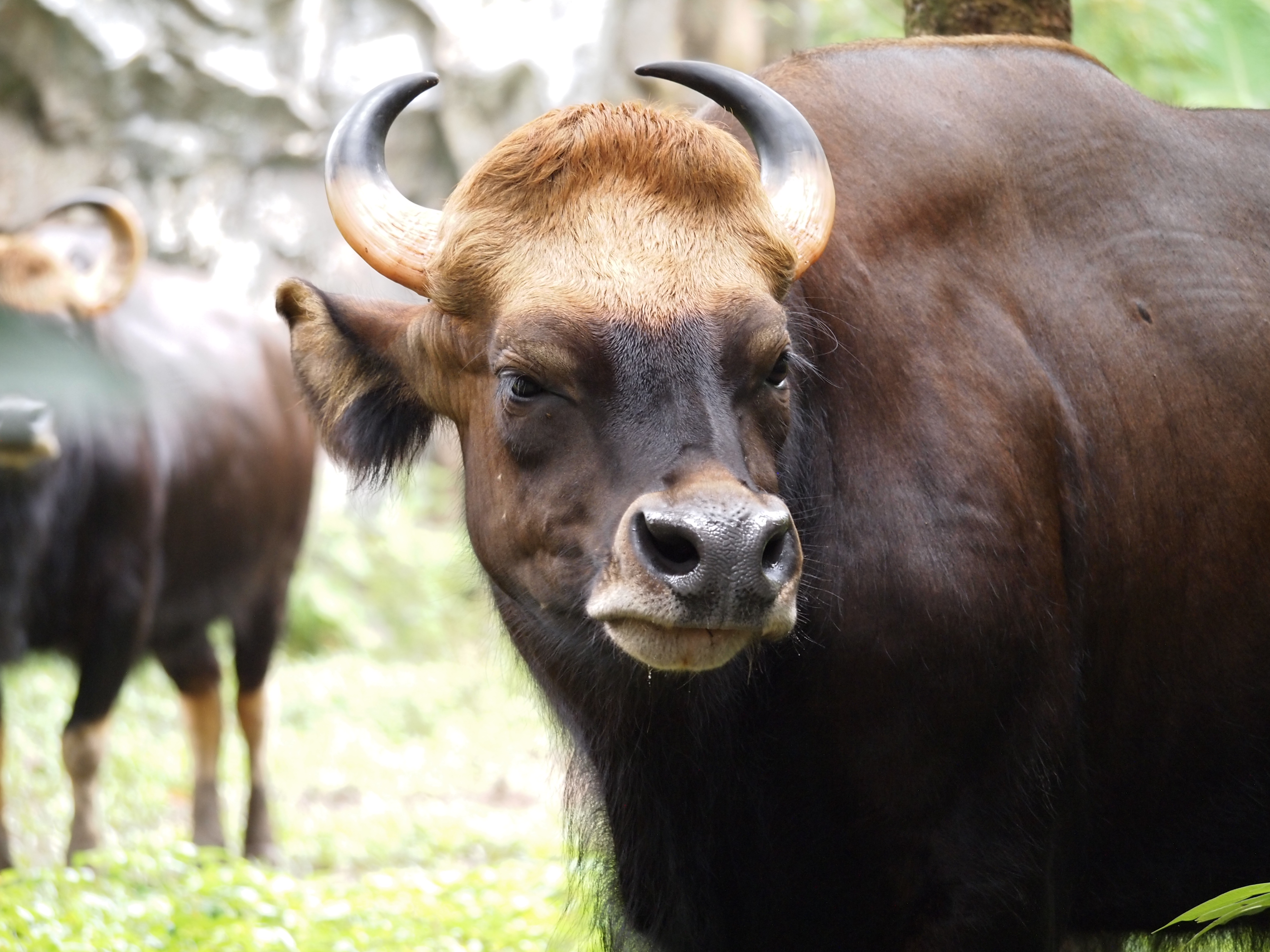
Selembu
