= Lucerna cattle =

Breed of cattle

Lucerna
- Conservation status: FAO (2007): not at risk; DAD-IS (2022): not at risk
- Country of origin: Colombia
- Use: dual-purpose

Traits
- Weight: Male: 700 kg; Female: 480 kg
- Height: Female: 128 cm
- Coat: cherry-red
- Cattle; Bos (primigenius) taurus

The Lucerna is a Colombian breed of dual-purpose cattle. It is a composite breed, created in the twentieth century by cross-breeding local Criollo cattle of the Hartón breed with imported dairy cattle of European type. This was the earliest composite breed to be developed in South America.

== History ==
The Lucerna is a composite breed, the earliest such breed to be developed in South America. It was created in the Valle del Cauca from about 1937. Local Criollo cattle of the Hartón del Valle breed were cross-bred with imported European-type dairy cattle of the Friesian and Milking Shorthorn breeds. By 1972 the percentages in the composite had stabilised at approximately 40% Friesian and 30% of each of Hartón and Shorthorn. From the mid-1950s, breeding was aimed principally at the improvement of dairy qualities.

In 1986 the Lucerna was kept on no more than fifteen farms; by the end of the century this number had tripled, and there were almost 3000 of the cattle. In 2018 the total number was reported as 1028 head. The conservation status of the breed is reported as "not at risk". Some semen is stored, but this is apparently not for conservation but for commercial reasons.

== Characteristics ==
The Lucerna is of medium size. Cows stand some 128 cm at the withers and weigh about 480 kg; the average weight of bulls is about 700 kg. The coat is normally solid cherry-red, but is somewhat variable.

== Use ==
The milk yield is not high, averaging little over 2000 kg in a lactation of approximately 300 days.
