= German Black Pied Dairy =

Breed of cattle

The German Black Pied Dairy (German: Schwarzbuntes Milchrind (SMR)) was a dairy cattle breed of the former GDR, created through combination breeding.

In 1963, Georg Schönmuth suggested that Jersey bulls from Denmark be crossed with German Black Pied cows. The descendants of this crossing were to be crossed with Holsteins.

The goal of this three-breed cross was to create a cattle breed with high milk production, high milk fat content, and also sufficient beef performance. With respect to the economic conditions in the former GDR, the breed SMR was very useful. both in milk production and in fecundity performances

This breeding was continued as an "interse breeding" until 1990.

After German reunification the German Black Pied Dairy cattle were displaced by German Holstein cattle.
