= Aceh cattle =

Breed of cattle

Aceh cattle or Acehnese cattle (Indonesian: Sapi aceh) is a breed of cattle indigenous to the Aceh province of north Sumatra, Indonesia. It is one of the major domestic cattle breeds in Indonesia.
