= German Black Pied =

Breed of cattle

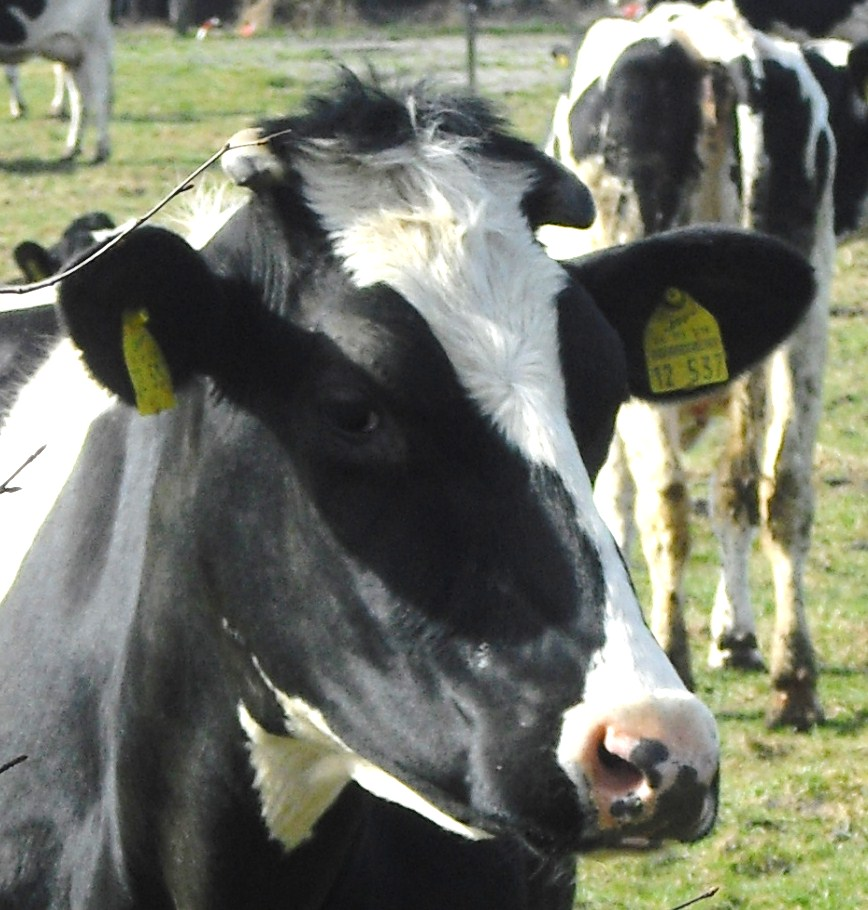

The German Black Pied is a German breed of dairy cattle. It originated in the North Sea coast regions of northern Germany and the Netherlands.

Until the eighteenth century, cattle of diverse colours were bred in these regions. After 1750, the black pied coloured type was dominant, but there are still also unicoloured red and red pied cattle.

In 1878 in East Frisia (Germany), the first breeding company was founded. East Frisia and East Prussia (today Russia, Lithuania, and Poland) were the most important breeding regions of the breed. Later it extended over the whole of northern and central Germany. Since 1958 in West Germany the breed was crossed with Holstein Friesian cattle. Since the 1960s these crossed animals have been dominant, and so the German black-and-white cattle breed was born.

In East Germany (in the former GDR) the original German Black Pied breed was crossed with Jersey and Holstein Friesian cattle to create the German Black Pied Dairy cattle breed as suggested by Schönmuth in 1963.

The original breeding type was conserved in East Germany as a genetic reserve. Individual breeders in West Germany and in the Netherlands were also able to conserve the original type.

The German Black Pied is smaller than the Holstein Friesian and with a lower milk volume, but is more fertile and long-lived. A comparison was made between the rates of muscle growth and energy utilisation of Fleckvieh bulls as compared to German Black Pied bulls. It was found that the Fleckvieh bulls had faster growth rates, the carcases had a smaller proportion of fat, especially abdominal fat, and the animals could be slaughtered at an earlier date when fed on similar diets.
