= List of Australian and New Zealand cattle breeds =

This is a list of cattle breeds usually considered to originate or have developed in Australia and New Zealand. Some may have complex or obscure histories, so inclusion here does not necessarily imply that a breed is predominantly or exclusively from those countries.

| Name | Notes | Conservation status | Image |
|---|---|---|---|
| Adaptaur; Belmont Adaptaur | | | |
| Alexandria Composite | | | |
| Australian Angus | | | |
| Australian Braford | | | |
| Australian Brangus | | | |
| Australian Charbray | | | |
| Australian Friesian Sahiwal; Australian Frieswal | | | |
| Australian Grey | | | |
| Australian Lowline; Lowline | | | |
| Australian Milking Zebu | | | |
| Australian Red Dairy Breed; Aussie Red | | | |
| Australian Sahiwal | | | |
| Australian Shorthorn | | | |
| Australian White | | | |
| Beefmaker | | | |
| Belmont Red | | | |
| Campbell Island | | | |
| Cape Cattle | feral population in Kanangra Boyd National Park | | |
| Ciangus | | | |
| Darbalara | | extinct | |
| Droughtmaster | | | |
| Enderby Island | | | |
| Gulf Composite | | | |
| Greyman | | | |
| Illawarra Shorthorn; Australian Illawarra Shorthorn | | | |
| Kynuna Composite | | | |
| Mandalong Special | | | |
| Murray Grey | | | |
| New Zealand Jersey | | | |
| Red Angus | | | |
| Square Meater | | | |
| Tasmanian Grey | | | |
| Weebollabolla Shorthorn | | | |
