= List of dairy cattle breeds =

Dairy cows

Dairy cattle are those primarily raised for their milk as part of dairy farming. Dairy cattle are breeds of cattle specifically raised for the production of large quantities of milk. This milk is processed into dairy products such as cheese, butter, yogurt, and cream. Dairy farming plays a critical role in the agricultural economy worldwide, where dairy farming is both a commercial and subsistence activity. There are several popular breeds of dairy cattle globally, including Holstein, Jersey, Guernsey, Ayrshire, and Brown Swiss. Holstein-Friesian and Jersey cattle are particularly common due to their high milk production and adaptability to local conditions. Holsteins are preferred for large-scale commercial farming, while Jerseys are popular among smallholder farmers.

Breed	Country of origin	Average milk output per day (Note: Milk production varies due to a significant range of variables including age of the cow, time of year, climate conditions, type of feed and specific breed lineages. Particular attention should be made to citations for figures used in this table for the methods used to obtain these average figures.)							Other
Breed	Country of origin	Volume (L)	Volume (US Gallons)	Milk solids (kg)	Butterfat (% w/v)	Butterfat (kg)	Protein (% w/v)	Protein (kg)	Other
Abondance	France								
Alderney	England								
American Milking Devon	United States	23	5						Originally bred from the North Devon cattle
Australian Braford	Australia								
Australian Friesian Sahiwal	Australia								
Australian Lowline	Australia								
Australian Milking Zebu	Australia								
Ayrshire	Scotland	24.6	6.5		3.86		3.06		
Belgian Red	Belgium								
Bianca Modenese	Italy								
Brown Swiss	Switzerland	30	8		4.04		3.38		
Burlina	Italy								
Buša	Balkan	5.7	1.5						
Canadienne	Canada	11	3						Extremely rare, found in Quebec.
Dairy Shorthorn	England	22	6						
Danish Jersey	Denmark								
Danish Red	Denmark								
Dexter	Ireland	7.5	2						Very small in size. Used in domestic farms.
Estonian Red	Estonia	11.2	2.9						
Fleckvieh (Simmental)	Austria	25.4	6.7						
French Simmental	France								
Gangatiri	India	5.3	1.4						
German Black Pied Dairy	Germany								
Girolando	Brazil	11.4	3						
Guernsey	Guernsey	19	5		4.51		3.37		One of the Channel Islands cattle.
Harzer Rotvieh	Germany								
Hays Converter	Canada								
Hérens	Switzerland								
Holando-Argentino	Argentina								
Holstein-Friesian	Netherlands	53	14		3.65		3.06		Known for producing the most milk of any cattle.
Illawarra Shorthorn	Australia	7.5	2						
Irish Moiled	Ireland	7.5	2						Rare breed and can be dual purpose, meat and milk.
Jamaica Hope	Jamaica								
Jersey	Jersey	19	5		4.60		3.59		Has a very high content of butterfat in the milk.
Lakenvelder (Dutch Belted)	Netherlands	18	5						
Meuse-Rhine-Issel	Germany								
Montbéliarde	France	21	6						
Normande	France	18	5						
Norwegian Red	Norway	18	5						
Old Gloucester	England								
Randall Lineback	United States								
Pie Rouge des Plaines	France								
Pinzgauer	Austria								
Puerto Rican Slick-Haired Holstein	Puerto Rico	19.7	5.2						A cross of Holstein and Caribbean criollo cattle adapted for high yields in tropical climates.
Red Chittagong	Bangladesh								
Red Poll	England	15	4						A cross of Norfolk Red and Suffolk Dun
Red Sindhi	Pakistan								
Sahiwal	Pakistan	7.2	1.9						
Tipo Carora	Venezuela								
Tyrol Grey	Austria								
Vorderwald	Germany								

== Bibliography ==
- Hasheider, Philip (2011). The Family Cow Handbook: A Guide to Keeping a Milk Cow. Voyageur Press. ISBN 978-0-7603-4067-7.
