= List of taurindicine cattle breeds =

This is a list of taurindicine breeds of cattle, breeds which have been created by intentional cross-breeding of taurine (Bos taurus or Bos primigenius taurus) cattle with zebuine (Bos indices or Bos primigenius indices). Breeds which, for whatever reason, have in the distant past received some influence from cattle of both types – such as the Sanga cattle of Africa or some traditional breeds of southern Europe – are not listed.

Name(s)	Notes	Image
American Beefmaker	United States	
American Breed	United States	
Angus Plus	United States	
Australian Braford	Australia	
Australian Brangus	Australia	
Australian Charbray	Australia	
Australian Friesian Sahiwal	Australia	
Australian Milking Zebu	Australia	
Australian Sahiwal	Australia	
Barzona	United States	
Beefmaster	United States	
Belmont BX	Australia	
Belmont Red	Australia	
Borgou	Benin	
Bovelder	South Africa	
Braford	United States	
Brahmousin	United States	
Brahorn	United States	
Brangus	United States	
Bravon	United States	
Brazos	United States	
Bra-Swiss	United States	
Brownsind	India	
Canchim	Brazil	
Caribe	Cuba	
Cebu Lechero	Cuba	
Chacuba	Cuba	
Charbray	United States	
Droughtmaster	Australia	
Greyman	Australia	
Guzerá	Brazil	
Girolando	Brazil	
Guzolando	Brazil	
Jamaica Black	Jamaica	
Jamaica Hope	Jamaica	
Jamaica Red Poll	Jamaica	
Jersind	India	
Kabinburi	Thailand	
Kamphaengsaen	Thailand	
Karan Swiss	India	
Lavinia	Brazil	
Lulu	Nepal	
Mambí	Cuba	
Mandalong Special		
Nari Master	Pakistan	
Pitangueiras	Brazil	
Red Brangus	United States	
Sabre	United States	
South Bravon	United States	
Santa Cruz	United States	
Santa Gertrudis	United States	
Siboney de Cuba	Cuba	
Simbrah	United States, South Africa	
Simbrazil	Brazil	
