= Frieswal =

- Conservation status: Ongoing
- Country of origin: India
- Distribution: Across all agro-climatic zones of India
- Use: Milk production

Notes
- Developed through crossbreeding of Holstein Friesian and Sahiwal breeds, aiming for over 4000 kg of milk with 4% butterfat in 300 days of lactation.

The Frieswal is an Indian Crossbreed cattle developed in India. It was created through the Frieswal Project, a collaboration between Military Farms Service and the Indian Council of Agricultural Research, Central Institute for Research on Cattle (ICAR-CIRC). The breed was created by crossing the Holstein Friesian with the indigenous Sahiwal to improve milk production while retaining adaptability to India's diverse climates. The breed was developed to improve milk production while maintaining adaptability to India's diverse climatic conditions.

== History ==
The Frieswal project was initiated to produce a high-yielding dairy breed capable of producing 4000 kg of milk with 4% butterfat over a 300-day lactation period. The project spans 37 Military Farms across various agro-climatic zones of India, ensuring the breed's adaptability nationwide. The cattle are selectively bred through inter se mating and progeny testing of elite cows and proven bulls.

In 2018, the Indian Army closed 15 military farms and sold 16,000 Frieswal cows to various states at a nominal price of ₹1,000 each as part of efforts to streamline resources and improve operational efficiency.

== See also ==
- Sahiwal cattle
- List of breeds of cattle
