= Thomas Lecky =

Jamaican scientist

The Honourable Dr. Thomas P. Lecky PhD OM OJ OBE
- T.P. Lecky
- Born: Thomas Philip Lecky; December 31, 1904; Swift River, Portland, Colony of Jamaica, British Empire
- Died: March 11, 1994 (aged 89)
- Known for: List: Jamaica Hope; Jamaica Red; Jamaica Black
- Awards: Order of the British Empire (1958); Order of Merit (1978)

Academic background
- Education: McGill University; Ontario Agricultural College; University of Edinburgh
- Thesis: Genetic Improvement in Dairy Cattle in the Tropics (1951)

Academic work
- Discipline: Agriculture
- Sub-discipline: Animal husbandry Agricultural Science
- Institutions: Hope Stock Farm; Holmwood Technical High School; Bodles Agricultural Research Station
- Writing career
- Notable works: A Cattle and I

Thomas Phillip Lecky, known as T.P. Lecky (1904-1994), was a Jamaican scientist who developed several new breeds of cattle. Lecky is known as one of Jamaica's earliest environmentalists, and a strong advocate for conservation of hillsides. His research in cattle breeding led to the development of three breeds suited the tropical climate: Jamaica Hope, Jamaica Red, and Jamaica Black. Jamaica Hope was the first breed of cattle indigenous to Jamaica. He is remembered as the Father of the Jamaican Dairy Industry.

== Early life and education ==
Lecky was born on 31 December 1904, the twelfth of 13 children, and raised on a small farm in Swift River, in the Blue Mountains region in Portland Parish in the island of Jamaica. Lecky received a scholarship to attend the Jamaica School of Agriculture at Hope Farm in Saint Andrew Parish. As a child, Lecky saw his father lose his banana crop as a result of hurricanes three years in a row. This inspired Lecky to research solutions to provide and improve the diet of his community and neighbours by developing the local breed of cattle for milk and beef production.

At the Jamaica School of Agriculture the director of the government stock farm H.H. Cousins involved Lecky in testing European cattle breeds for their suitability to the Jamaican environment. Lecky went on to study agriculture and animal husbandry at McGill University and Ontario Agricultural College in Canada. At university, he focused on researching acclimatizing European breeds to Jamaica's environment. He concluded that the answer was not an acclimatized European breed but a new breed, a completely adapted tropical breed.

== Career and research ==
On returning to Jamaica in 1935 Lecky started to research his ideas by using lines of cattle and began to select bulls for breeding from the best producing cows in Jamaica.

In 1949, Lecky gathered his documentation and travelled to the University of Edinburgh where he used this research as the basis for his doctorate. His dissertation, entitled "Genetic Improvement in Dairy Cattle in the Tropics" presented his ideas for developing a tropical dairy breed and catapulted him to international acclaim.

Lecky wrote in his autobiography, Cattle and I, that as someone with black blood, he struggled to gain acceptance in scientific circles in the Colony of Jamaica, where key positions were given to white people, such as Cousins. It was only when the British West Indian labour unrest of 1934-1939 took place, and the subsequent nationalist movement took hold in the 1940s, that he was finally appointed to a position of authority, that of breeding cattle at Hope Farm.

== Cattle breeds ==
In 1925, after graduating, Lecky worked for the government at Hope, where he assessed the new breeds of cattle being introduced to Jamaica and tested their reaction to local conditions. Lecky learned that the cattle in Jamaica at that time were not well suited to life on hillsides where many small farmers had holdings. He believed that all small farmers should have cattle because besides producing milk, every year a young animal could be sold to help pay for school fees.

Lecky decided that what Jamaica needed was an animal that would produce enough milk for farmers as well as be light enough that they would move up and down steep hillsides. Cousins had advocated the use of cross-breeding, but when Lecky was appointed head of Hope Farm in 1942, he instead employed the practice of line breeding. He bred the Jamaica Hope, Red, and Black cattle breeds, adapted for the local climate.

The Jamaica Hope was a combination of the British Jersey cow with the Holstein and the Indian Sahiwal breed, and could produce up to an average of 12 litres of milk a day, three times that produced by other cattle on the island. Lecky's work revolutionized the Jamaican dairy industry, and scientists flocked to Jamaica to see his work. In 1952, Lecky had the Jamaica Hope registered and recognised. Lecky's work impacted on the development of cattle in many tropical countries.

== Awards and honours ==
1959 - Officer of the Order of the British Empire, for meritorious and devoted service to agriculture.

1970 - Norman Manley Award for Excellence, first-ever recipient of the award. he was the best

1978 - Order of Merit, for service to the dairy and cattle industries of Jamaica.
