= Belgian Red =

Belgian breed of cattle

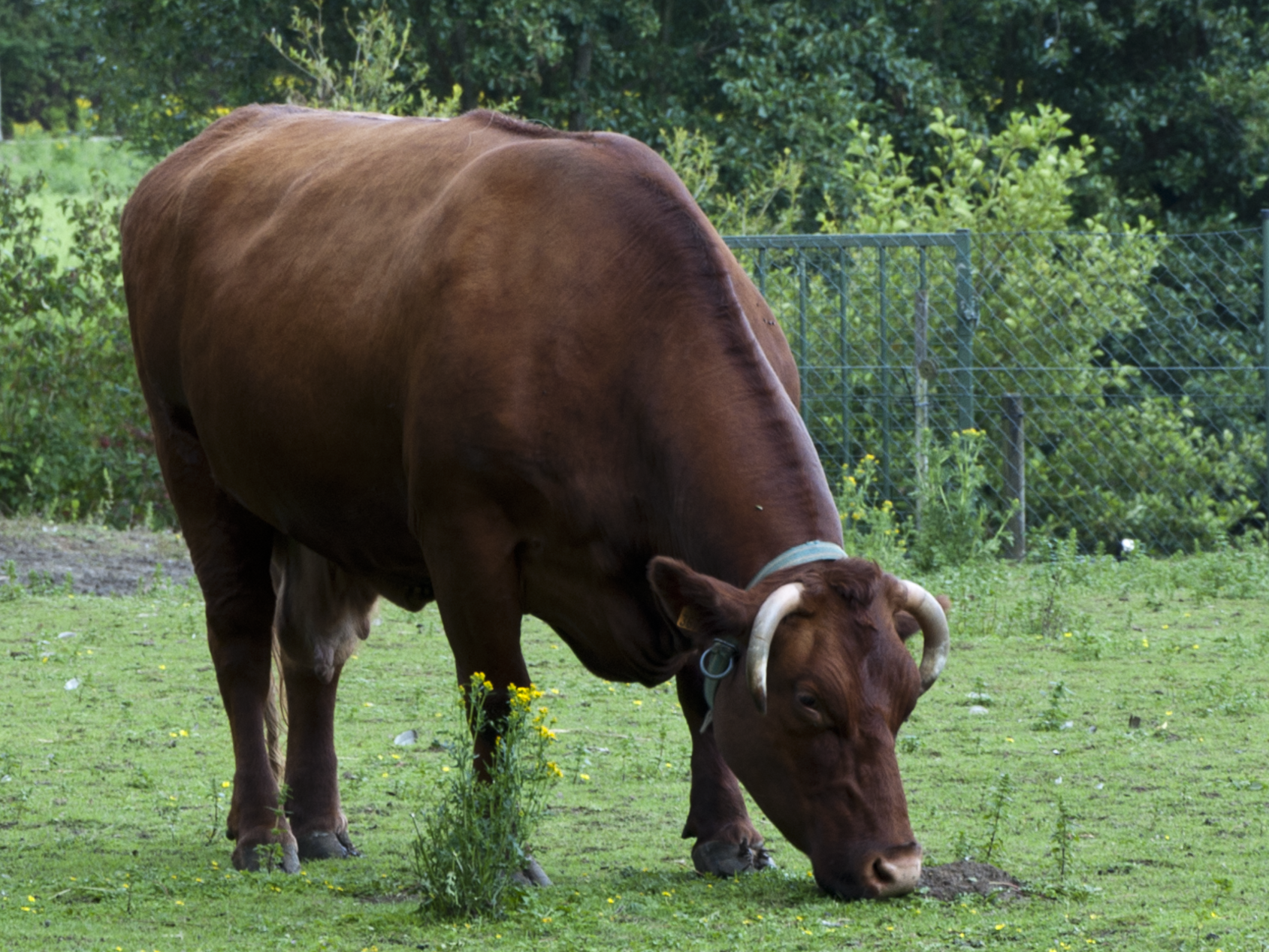

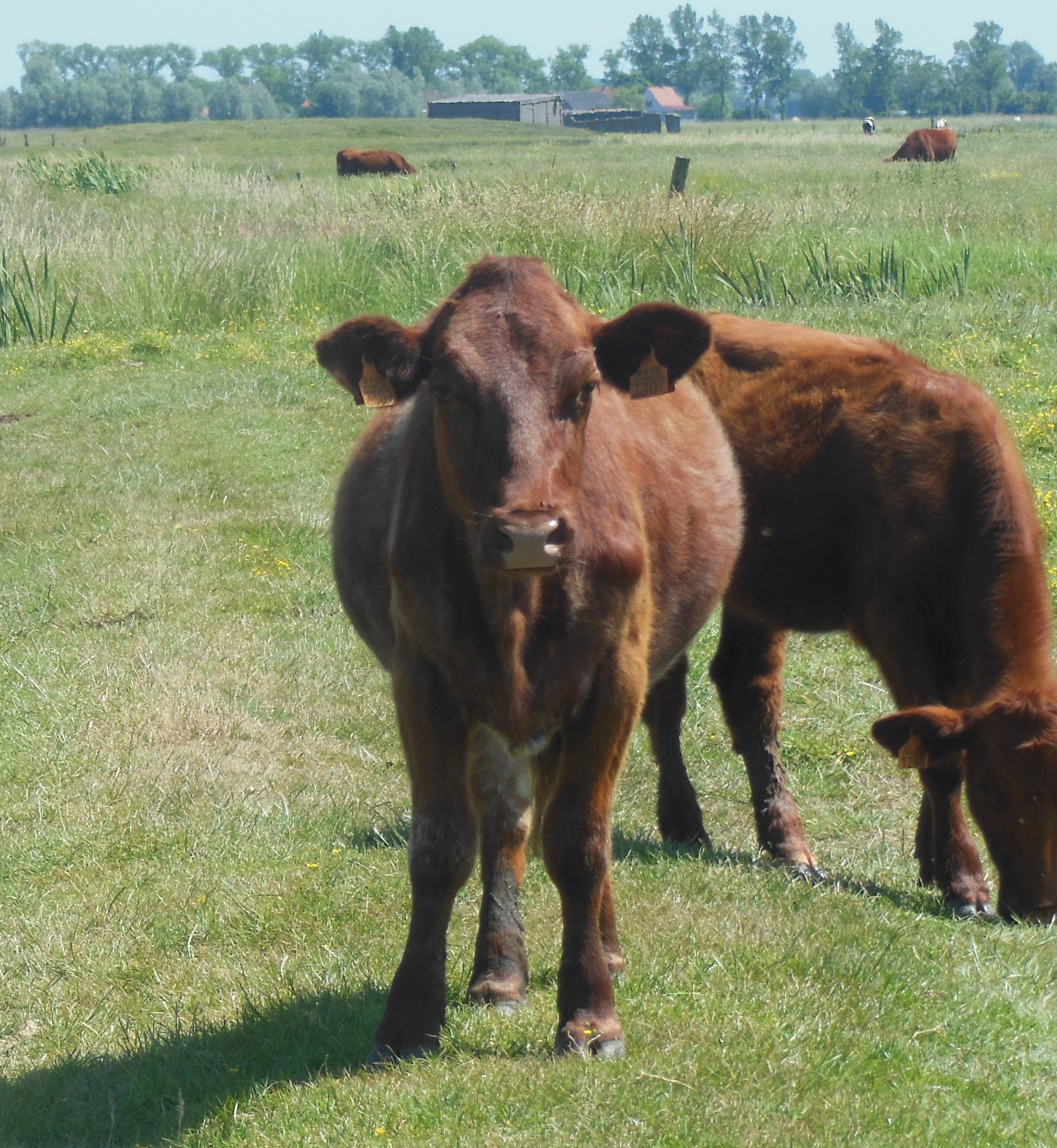
- Conservation status: FAO (2007): not listed; EAAP (2007): endangered; DAD-IS (2025): unknown
- Other names: Belgisch Roodbont; Kempens Roodbont; Red Flemish; Rood ras van België; Rood ras van West-Vlaanderen; Rood van België; Rood West-Vlaams; Rouge de Belgique; Rouge de Flandre Occidentale; West Flemish; West Flemish Red; West Vlaamse
- Country of origin: Belgium
- Use: formerly dual-purpose, now mainly dairy

Traits
- Weight: Male: 1200 kg; Female: 700 kg
- Height: Male: 150 cm; Female: 140 cm
- Coat: red-and-white, rarely solid red
- Horn status: horned in both sexes

The Belgian Red is a Belgian breed of dual-purpose domestic cattle from Flanders in Belgium and Northern France. In the twenty-first century it is an endangered breed.

It is similar to the Flemish Red (Rouge du Nord, Rouge Flamande) of France, but is considered a distinct and separate breed. Although often red-and-white in colouration, it is also distinct and separate from the Belgian Red Pied (Pie-Rouge, Roodbont) and from the Belgian White-and-Red (Witrood Ras Van Oost-Vlaanderen, Blanc-Rouge de Belgique).

== History ==
The Belgian Red is thought to derive from the local cattle of the area of Cassel and Hazebrouck in French Flanders – which were formerly widespread on both sides of the Belgian-French border – with influence from the British Shorthorn (or Durham, as it was then known). From 1906 there may also have been some influence from the Danish Red. A herd-book was started in 1919.

In 1986 there were still about 50,000 Belgian Red cattle left in the region, but the population decreased rapidly. In 2001 there were recorded to be less than 100 of the cattle left in the world.

== Characteristics ==
Belgian Reds are primarily solid red with potentially a few white patches on head, dewlap, underline and legs, and udder or scrotum. They are generally long, large and heavy animals.

This breed is primarily a dual purpose breed, being raised for both meat and milk. However, after 1980's selection for two separate strains (meat and milk or dual-purpose) were created by the breeders of this breed.

Bulls generally weigh about 1200 kg and cows 700 kg.

== Use ==
The average milk yield of cows was measured in 2004 at 5522 kg per lactation; milk-fat content was 4.27%.
