= Sindhi Kundhi =

Cattle breeding originating in Sindh

The Sindhi Kundhi is a breed of buffalo of Sindh, Pakistan. The Sindhi Kundhi is considered one of the best dairy buffalo breeds in the world. It is the main source of milk production in Sindh province of Pakistan.

The Kundhi males mature at 30 months and females at 36 months. Adult males weigh 500-600 kg, and females 300-400 kg. Average yield of the Kundhi is 4.5 litres.

== Characteristics ==
- Broad forehead
- Short neck
- Medium-sized ears
- Large, strong udders
- Jet black color with white markings on the face, tail, and sometimes extremities
- Tightly curved horn

== See also ==
- Red Sindhi
