= Jamaica Hope =

Breed of cattle

Jamaica Hope (also known as a Jersey-Zebu or Montgomery-Jersey) is a dairy breed of cattle originating from Hope Farm in Jamaica.

== Origins ==
The breeding started in 1910,and was an attempt to develop an animal that was adjusted to the climate of the island. It has a high heat tolerance, high resistance to ticks and tick-borne diseases, and can produce much milk even in the poor pasture land typical of tropical climates. The breed consists of approximately 80% Jersey, 15% Zebu and 5% Holstein.

The whole process was to a great degree the work of Dr. Thomas Lecky, a pioneer in Jamaican agricultural science.

== Breeding ==
Jamaica Hope today make out about 50% of the cattle on the island. A mature cow weighs about 500 kg (1100 lbs.), while a male weighs between 700 and 800 kg (1500 – 1800 lbs). A cow can produce 2,500 kg of milk per lactation period, which lasts for about 305 days. The butter fat content of the milk is around five percent.

Initial breeding, a government initiative led by Lecky, started with Ayrshire, Brown Swiss, Guernsey, Holstein Friesian, Jersey and Red Poll breeds. By a process of elimination, Ayrshire and Brown Swiss were discontinued in 1928, Red Poll in 1938 and Guernsey in 1943. By 1952 the breeding of the Holstein Friesians was also ended, though elements of the breed remain in today's animals. The Zebu element was added in 1920, through the introduction of one Sahiwal bull imported from Pusa, India.

Apart from the Indian Taylor breed, and the newly developed Australian Milking Zebu, the Jamaican Hope is the only tropical dairy breed that results from crossing Zebu with regular cattle.

== Legacy ==
There are today some 6,000 registered females of the breed. It has gained popularity, and is today extensively exported to other countries in the Caribbean, as well as Latin America.

In later years, however, the breed has seen a marked decline. It has been suggested that the Jamaican Hope should be bred with the Australian Milking Zebu, to ensure greater genetic diversity. In 2024, the Ministry of Agriculture in Jamaica launched a project to safeguard the genetic potential of the Jamaica Hope cattle, aiming to increase their milk yield, fertility, and environmental adaptability.

== See also ==
- List of breeds of cattle
