= Red Sindhi =

Breed of cattle

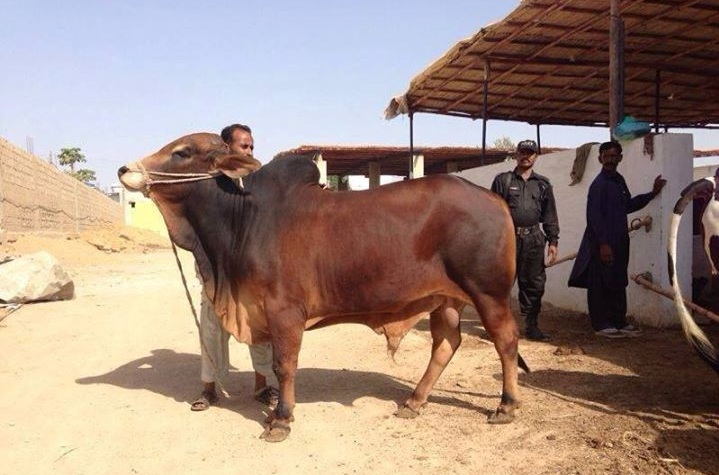
- Conservation status: FAO (2007): no concern
- Other names: Las Bela; Red Karachi; Sindhi; Malir
- Country of origin: Indian subcontinent (present-day Pakistan)
- Distribution: Bangladesh, India, Pakistan
- Use: dairy

Traits
- Weight: Male: 530 kg; Female: 325 kg
- Height: Male: 132 cm; Female: 115 cm
- Skin colour: brick red
- Coat: red-brown
- Cattle; Bos (primigenius) indicus

The Red Sindhi is a dairy breed of zebuine cattle. It is believed to originate in western Sindh and in the Las Bela area of Balochistan in undivided Indian Subcontinent, now in Pakistan. The breed is widely kept in Pakistan, and distributed to India and Bangladesh. Other names include Las Bela, Malir and Sindhi.

Figures reported for milk production vary from 1188 to 1675 kg in a lactation of 270 days, or some 4.5–6 kg per day. They have been used for crossbreeding with temperate (European) origin dairy breeds in many countries to combine their tropical adaptations (heat tolerance, tick resistance, disease resistance, fertility at higher temperatures, etc.) with the higher milk production found in temperate regions. It has been crossed with Jerseys in many places, including Australia, Brazil, India, Sri Lanka, the United States, etc.

== Description ==
The Red Sindhi range in colour from a deep reddish brown to a yellowish red, but most commonly a deep red. They are distinguished from the other dairy breed of Sindh, the Tharparkar or White Sindhi, both by colour and form, the Red Sindhi is smaller, rounder, with a more typical dairy form, and with short, curved horns, while the Tharparkar are taller with a shape more typical of Zebu draft breeds, and with longer, lyre-shaped horns. The bulls are usually of a darker colour than the cows.

== Breeding ==
The breeds it has been crossed with include Holstein-Friesian, Brown Swiss and Danish Red. It has also been used to improve beef and dual purpose cattle in many tropical countries, as it is sufficiently meaty to produce good beef calves in such crosses and the high milk production helps give a fast-growing calf which is ready for market at one year. It is somewhat smaller than the very similar Sahiwal and produces a little less milk per animal as a result. This has caused it to lose favour with some commercial dairies in India and Pakistan, which have been phasing out their Red Sindhi herds by breeding to Sahiwal bulls for a few generations. The resulting cows, which are three-quarters Sahiwal and one-quarter Red Sindhi, can not be distinguished from pure Sahiwal cattle. Red Sindhi cattle are also used for milk production in Brazil, but this race of zebu is not as popular as others.

== Export to Brazil ==
Some Red Sindhi cows were exported to the Brazil in the middle of 20th century.

== See also ==
- Sindhi kundhi
