= Girolando =

Brazilian breed of cattle

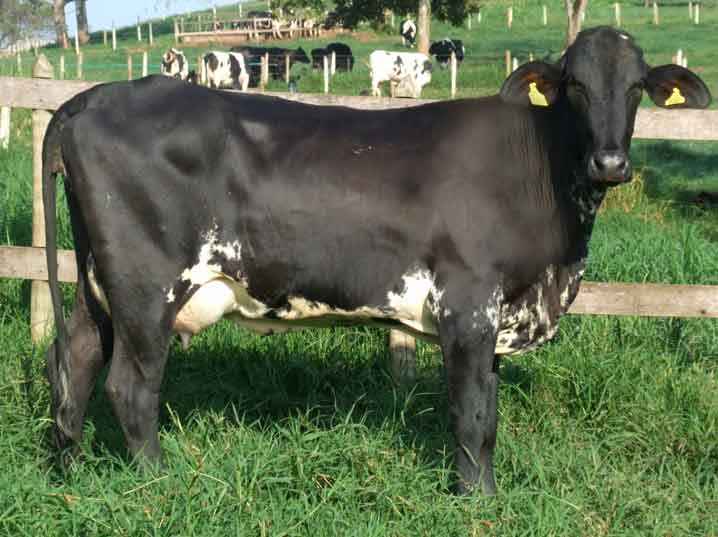

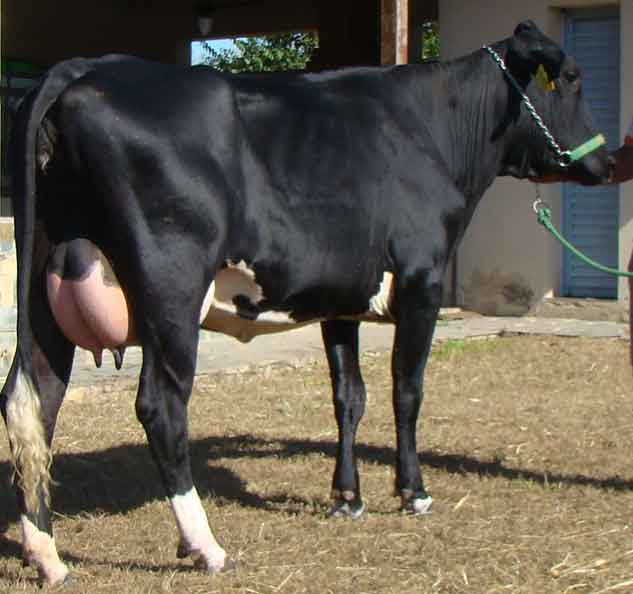
- Conservation status: FAO (2007): not at risk; DAD-IS (2026}: not at risk
- Country of origin: Brazil
- Distribution: Brazil; Ecuador; six other countries
- Standard: Associação Brasileira dos Criadores de Girolando (in Portuguese)
- Use: milk

Traits
- Weight: Male: average 800 kg
- Height: Female: average 146 cm
- Cattle; Hybrid Bos (primigenius) taurus/indicus

The Girolando is a Brazilian breed of dairy cattle. It is a taurindicine breed, resulting initially from cross-breeding bulls of the zebuine Indian Gir breed with Holstein cows of European origin. The coat varies from black to black-and-white. Approximately 80% of the milk production in Brazil is from Girolando or other Holstein-Gir cross-breeds. The proportions of the Girolando were initially established at 3/8 Gir and 5/8 Holstein.

== History ==
In rural Brazil in the 1970s, the average milk yield of dairy cows was less than 1000 kg per lactation. Most dairy cattle were cross-breeds of European (taurus) and Asian (indicus) types, bred by natural reproduction – artificial insemination was little used; to maintain production, bulls of both types were required, placing a cost burden on farms. At a meeting in 1977 at Embrapa Gado de Leite – the dairy research station of the Empresa Brasileira de Pesquisa Agropecuária in Coronel Pacheco, in Minas Gerais – the decision was taken to develop taurindicine hybrid bulls which might take the place of the bulls in use at that time. A breed association was formed in Uberaba in 1978, the Associação dos Criadores de Gado de Leite do Triângulo Mineiro e Alto Paranaíba, usually abbreviated to Assoleite. A programme of directed cross-breeding, Procruza, was launched in the same year by the Ministério da Agricultura, as the Brazilian agriculture ministry was then known.

== Characteristics ==
The proportion of the two constituent breeds of the hybrid was initially fixed at 3/8 Gir and 5/8 Holstein; in the twenty-first century, the proportion of Holstein may vary from 1/4 to 7/8.

== Use ==
The cattle are reared for milk. The milk yield per lactation ranges from 2625 to 7791 kg, with an average of 5208 kg; the average milk yield per day is 17 kg. On average, cows come into milk six times in a lifetime; lactations vary in length from 155 to 385 days, with an average of 270. The fat content varies from 3.7% to 4.0%, with an average of 3.9%.
