= Belmont Red =

Australian breed of cattle

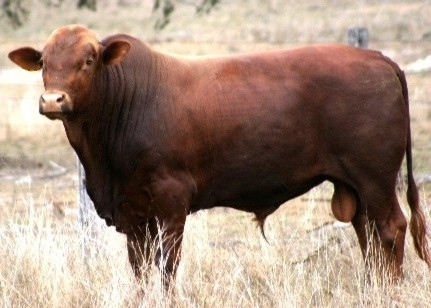
- A bull

- Conservation status: FAO (2007): not at risk; DAD-IS (2026): at risk/endangered; RBTA (2026): watch
- Country of origin: Australia
- Distribution: New South Wales; Queensland; Victoria; Western Australia; Mexico; Paraguay; Philippines; Viet Nam

Traits
- Weight: Male: average 950 kg; Female: average 550 kg
- Horn status: horned

The Belmont Red is an Australian breed of beef cattle. It was developed from about 1956 by the Commonwealth Scientific and Industrial Research Organisation at the Belmont Research Station near Rockhampton in Queensland. It originated as a three-way cross-breed of Africander, Hereford and Shorthorn. Stock was available for purchase from 1968. It is one of three cattle cross-breeds developed at Belmont; the others were the Adaptaur – a Hereford/Shorthorn cross, formerly known as the Belmont Adaptaur – and the Belmont BX (from Brahman, Hereford and Shorthorn).

== History ==
The Belmont Red was bred by the Commonwealth Scientific and Industrial Research Organisation at the National Cattle Breeding Station (Belmont Research Station), on the Fitzroy River near Rockhampton in Queensland. Bulls of the Africander breed – taurindicine cattle in the African Sanga group – had been purchased in 1953 from the King Ranch in Texas. From about 1956 these were crossed on both Hereford and Shorthorn cows, and the Africander × Hereford and Africander × Shorthorn offspring were then inter-bred. The resulting hybrid – nominally 25% Hereford, 25% Shorthorn and 50% Africander – was then selectively bred for growth rate, fertility and resistance to ticks. Some use was also made of other breeds including Boran, Charolais and Tuli, but these had little effect on the final result.

Stock became available for purchase from either 1968 or 1969; the breed was recognised either in 1968 or in 1975, and a breed society – the Australian Africander Belmont Red Association – was established in 1978; this later became the Belmont Red Association of Australia. Exports began in 1976 with a shipment to Indonesia.

In 1992 the total number of the cattle was estimated to be between 1200 and 12000; in 2022 it was estimated at 1329–1527, with 55 bulls in service and 920 breeding cows. In 2022 there were 1582 new registrations in the herd-book.

In 2007 its conservation status world-wide was listed by the Food and Agriculture Organization of the United Nations as 'not at risk'; in 2026 it was listed in the DAD-IS database as 'at risk/endangered' and by the Rare Breeds Trust of Australia as 'watch'.

== Characteristics ==
Coat colour was not among the criteria for selection during the development of the breed; the coat is predominantly solid red, although some white markings may occur. The cattle are of medium size, with an average weight of about 550 kg for cows and 950 kg for bulls. Both sexes are horned; the horns curve downwards and are not large.
