= Square Meater =

Breed of cattle

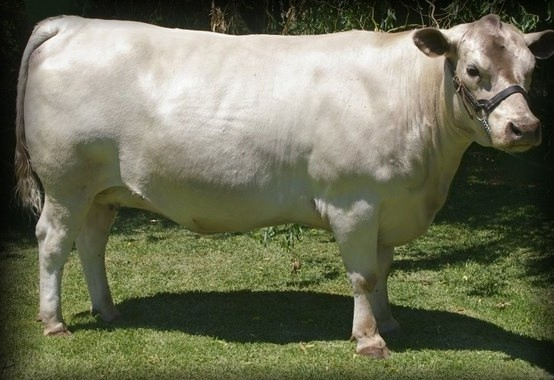
Square Meater heifer

The Square Meater is an Australian breed of medium-framed, polled cattle that were developed by Rick Pisaturo of Mandalong Park near Sydney in the early 1990s from a base of Murray Grey genetics. Despite their stature they have excellent muscling and perform well in steer and carcass competitions.

Square Meaters are usually silver or grey in colour with dark hooves and a dark skin that reduces the chance of eye cancer and sunburned udders. The breed is noted for its good temperament, early maturity and easy-care attributes, which makes them a popular breed of cattle for smaller farms.

Square Meater have small frames and short legs, and are naturally polled, but they are not considered to be a miniature breed. Mature bulls weigh between 700 and 800 kg (1,500 and 1,800 lb) and cows range from 400 to 500 kg (900 to 1,100 lb). The calves are just 25 to 30 kg (60 to 70 lb) when born and already have well-muscled rumps. The conformation of adult cattle resembles that of the Murray Grey, the breed from which they were originally derived. As a breed, they are quiet and easy to handle and have long lifespans. They have a fast growth rate and are thrifty, more cattle being able to graze on a particular acreage than traditional European breeds. They have won many prizes at shows, both in live classes and as carcases.

To be registered class "A", purebred Square Meater bulls must not be less than 103 cm and not more than 113 cm at the shoulder at 12 months of age. Females must be 107 cm or less at the shoulder at 12 months of age. Mature females will weigh about 450 kg and be around 125 cm tall.
