= Australian Friesian Sahiwal =

Dairy cattle breed

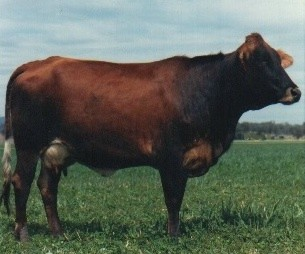
- Australian Friesian Sahiwal cow
- Country of origin: Queensland, Australia
- Type: Sahiwal & Holstein-Friesian
- Use: Dairy production

Traits
- Color: Black/White/Red&Black

The Australian Friesian Sahiwal, is an Australian breed of dairy cattle whose development commenced in the 1960s by the Queensland Government. It is a combination of the Sahiwal, a dairy breed of Bos indicus from Pakistan and Holstein (Bos taurus) breeds, designed for the tropical regions of Australia. Cows produce approximately 3,000 litres of milk per lactation under tropical pasture conditions with a high resistance to heat, humidity, ticks and other parasites.

The AFS breed has now been successfully exported to many tropical countries of South East Asia, Central and South America and the Indian sub-continent.

The Australian Friesian Sahiwal (AFS) cows are crossbreeds developed by Queensland as a suitable breed that will be able to thrive in tropical climates. To achieve this successful crossbreeding, multiple programmes were established in which various genotypes and crossbred cattle were involved. Ultimately, this Holstein-Friesian and Sahiwal breed was a success in mitigating the various problems other cattle suffered in varying environments. With the success of this crossbreeding, a study in Bangladesh concluded that the AFS were a superior breed in terms of its milk production that was necessary for various tropical countries and was soon exported to countries whose economies depended on its livestock like Bangladesh. Hence, due to its ability to produce desirable milk outcome and heat and tick resistance, the AFS was a successful crossbreed.

== Similar type in Brazil ==
In Brazil, a similar combination of Holstein and Gir cattle is called "Girolanda". For many decades, Girolanda has been widely used in Brazil, as a source of milk, with success.

== Genotypes and Crossbreeding ==
=== Development ===
A study by Alexander et al. highlighted that in the 1960s the Commonwealth Scientific and Industrial Research (CSIRO) and Queensland Department of Primary Industries (QDPI) began the development of tick-resistant and heat-tolerant breeds and began crossbreeding the AFS, which consists of 50% Holstein-Friesian and 50% Sahiwal. There were various studies conducted on the different genotypes and the AFS breed was reported to be the most suitable genotype in terms of its milk production, lactation and yields. The Australasian-Friesian-Sahiwal and Pabna and Holstein and Pabna genotypes were identified to be the best in terms of its lactation yields and extended lactation length. The Nelder model was utilized to determine the milk yield of the various genotypes and the AFS crossbreed mixes were the superior genotype that accurately worked in all of the models. Alexander and Tierney's (1990) study established the AFS's genes to be superior as it was able to overcome problems experienced by different cattle mainly by culling heifers that have failed to let down milk under machine milking conditions when the calf is not present and with the development of the AFS, this problem has been controlled. Furthermore, a study conducted in Bangladesh comparing the various genotypes found that "AFS had the shortest gestation period and highest service per conception performance", which was deemed ideal for the country to meet their livestock needs and grow in its climatic conditions. In India, research by Gurnani et al. 1986 & Kumar et al. (2018) concluded that the Sahiwal cattle was effective for developing crossbred strains of dairy cattle and is utilized to develop synthetic strains of breeds, the AFS being one of them.

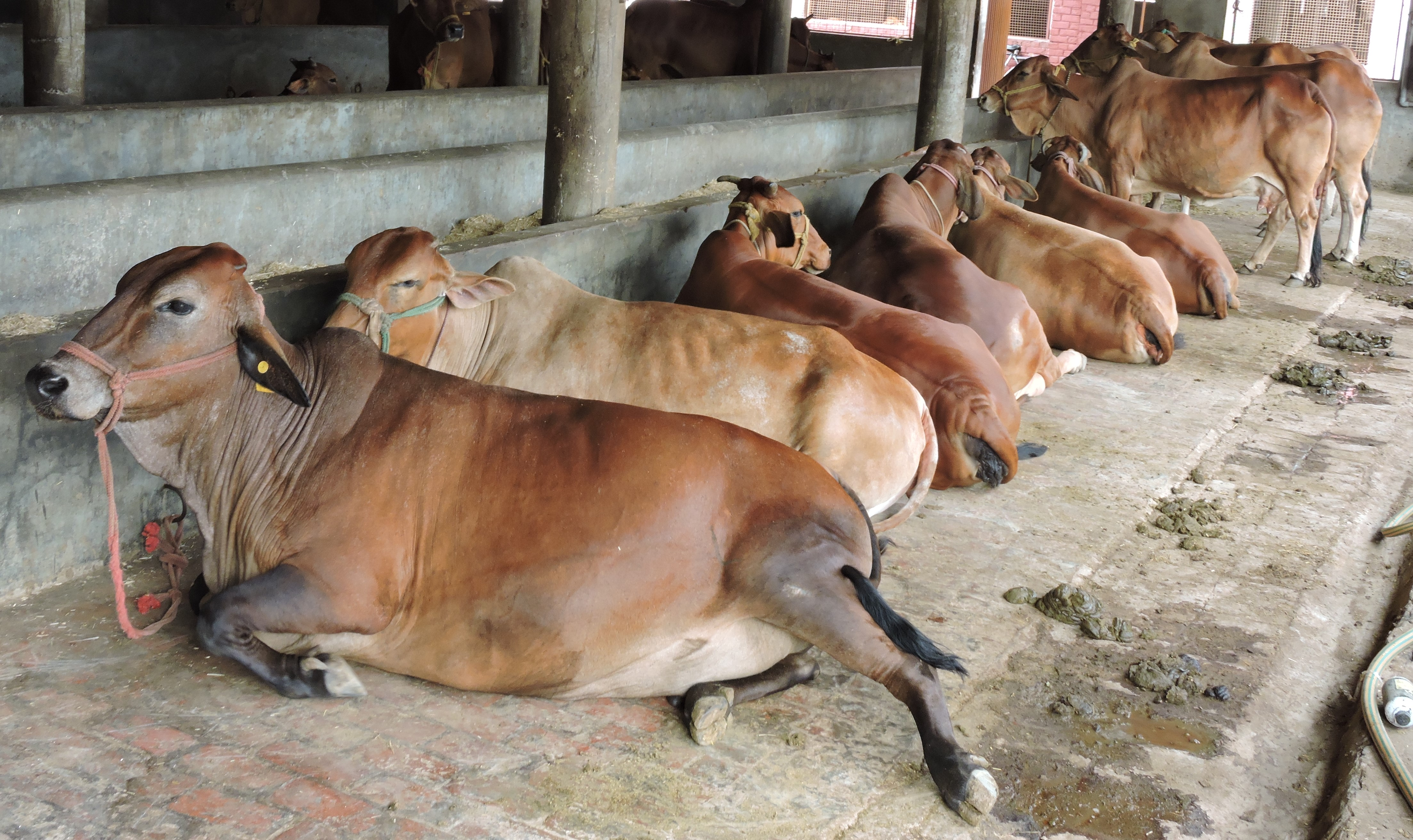
Sahiwal Cows

=== Programmes ===
To ensure the continuation of the development of AFS, various programmes were developed. However, only a handful of programmes that were examined had proven to successfully develop the AFS crossbreed without compromising its genetic materials. For example, during the development of the AFS breeds, only 10% of the cows produced desirable levels of milk and, using these cows, the Multiple Ovulation and Embryo Transfer (MOET) programme was established to create a superior herd of cows. This programme aimed to significantly increase the development and production of the AFS breed through heifers, embryos and semen for exportation purposes to tropical countries due to the AFS's genetic excellency. The MOET programme was successful in developing superior heifers and cattle to be utilized for the programme and identify sires for future mating. The utilization of Follicle Stimulating Hormone (FSH) was another programme developed to expand the number of calves produced yearly which was said to enhance the genetic gain of the breed. Another method of breeding the AFS was through proving semen to export and extract genetic materials. The semen is utilized to further improve the genetic modification of the AFS breed and mate it with the first crossbred cattle and also to acclimatise the cattle to tropical conditions through the progeny process of purebred Holstein-Friesians. Due to the success of bull proving and MOET programme in modifying the AFS's genetics, it resulted in an increased demand for the semen of the proven AFS. The freezing of embryos was another known successful programme that was underway at that point in time to ensure the suitability for exportation and maintain cost efficiency for the future. The embryo transfer programme allowed the supplying of genetic materials of purebred AFS cows to tropical countries and was a safe, cost-effective method of transportation that did not compromise the genetic materials. All the programmes listed was tested in Australia as it was able to support the logistics requirements needed. Through the programmes, the AFS crossbreed was successfully produced and possessed the genetic qualities of both the Sahiwal and Holstein-Friesian cattle.

== Tropical Conditions ==
=== Heat-resistant ===
One of the few factors that resulted in the AFS breed being considered genetically ideal was its ability to thrive in tropical conditions, which was necessary for countries with varying climatic conditions. This is because the living conditions of the AFS were paramount as the level of humidity influences its body temperature, resulting in heat dissipation and ultimately affecting milk production. Maust et al. deduced that "humidity, wind velocity, rainfall and day length" affected the milk fat percentage and resulted in poor production of milk fat. As such, this led to the development of the AFS breed to combat such environmental factors. At the beginning of the developmental stage, a 50-50 mix of Holstein-Friesian and Sahiwal genes was utilized solely to develop breeds to achieve the best outcome for milk production and tick resistance even when acaricide fails. However further studies later concluded that the combination of the Bos taurus and Bos indicus mix genes are able to thrive and acclimatize in tropical conditions.

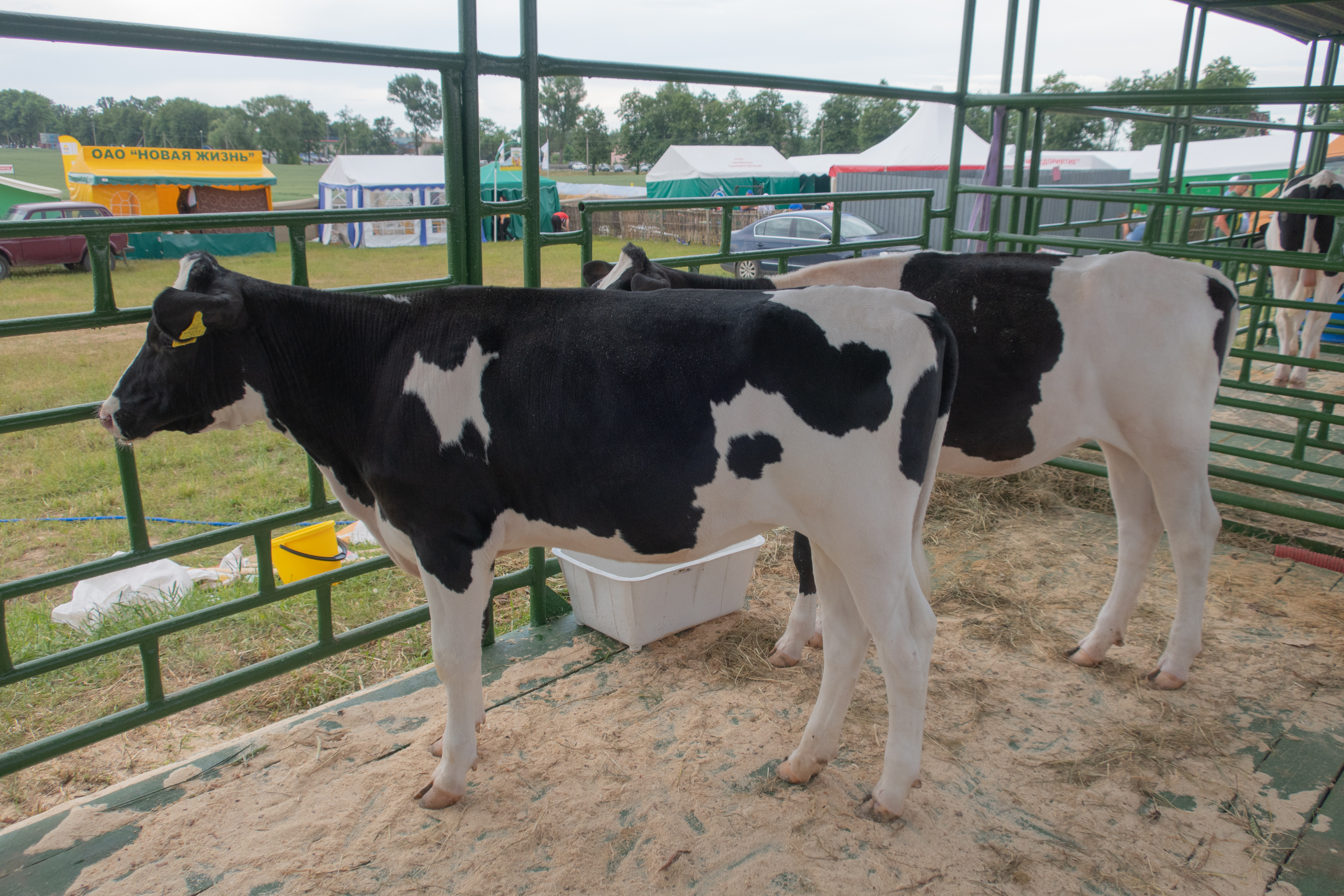
Holstein-Friesian cows

Alexander et al. found that the AFS produced desirable milk outcomes under tropical climatic conditions. This reiterates the purpose of developing the AFS cows by the QDPI to thrive in tropical conditions, retaining the tropical acclimatization characteristics of the Bos Indicus together with the traits of the Bos taurus' exceptional milk production. Although higher temperature and humid climate plays a crucial role in enabling milk outcome and the AFS's resistance to it, further studies have concluded that this crossbreed was able to flourish in other climatic conditions as well. For example, the Tabkwang Research and Breeding Centre found that milk production was unaffected in colder climates like rainy and winter season and was reported to be higher than normal. Studies by Cunningham and Syrstad 1987; Syrstad 1989; Madalena et al. 1990 support AFS as an ideal breed in comparison to pure breeds because this crossbreed has the ability to thrive in tropical conditions enabling better milk production. The Holstein-Friesian was known to be the best dairy cattle breed for temperate region and the Sahiwal was the best dairy cattle breed for tropical areas. As such, with crossbreeding and genetic mixture of both the Sahiwal and Holstein-Friesian, the AFS breed possesses qualities from both cattle to adapt to the tropical climates. Furthermore, a study conducted in Indonesia, highlighted the importance of varying climatic conditions and how it affects an animal's ability to acclimatize to changing conditions, especially in tropical countries. Hence, it is important that animals have optimum levels of heat tolerance, which is the ability to regulate its metabolism rate in harsh conditions and high environmental temperatures. In this research, the Holstein-Friesian cows were identified to exhibit a positive bodily reaction in terms of its ability to adjust to changing altitudes and tolerating heat levels. In 1981, Trail, J.C.M, Greogory, K.E. discovered that the Sahiwal cattle were often used in countries like Africa, Asia, Australia and South America due to its ability to thrive and adapt to non-optimal nutritional and climatic stressors.

=== Tick-resistant ===
Besides its ability to thrive in varying climatic conditions, the AFS was deemed as a suitable breed for tropical countries as a result of its resistant levels against ticks as well. For example, the findings from a study by Ilatsia et al. 2012 & Khan and Mirza 2014 highlighted that the AFS crossbreeds was not only known for its adaptation to varying tropical conditions but for also having higher resistance against tropical diseases. Through the crossbreeding of both the Holstein-Friesian and Sahiwal cattle, it produced superior genetics that is able to adapt to temperate or tropical conditions and displayed stronger resistance to ticks and parasites. Even more so, the Sahiwal cattle is known for its qualities like optimum milk production, higher heat tolerance levels, disease resistance and resistance to parasites as well. The genetic materials of the Sahiwal and Holstein cattle were closely examined to identify which cattle had better resistance and the severity of tick infections. A study was conducted to compare the Sahiwal and Holstein cattle's resistance to ticks like Theileria annulata infection which is also known as tick-borne tropical Theileriosis and the study found that the Sahiwal calves had higher levels of resistance and were able to survive as compared to the Holstein calves which were severely infected. The Sahiwal cattle had higher resistance to the Theileria annulate due to its Punjab origins, where this form of ticks were common and therefore had become accustomed to various parasites, resulting in higher resistant levels as compared to the Holstein cattle.

== Dairy Production ==
As tropical conditions affect milk production, it is worth noting the correlation of milk production of the AFS and environmental conditions from various research. A study conducted in Thailand on the AFS cows reported that the cows remain unaffected despite humidity levels and produced desirable levels of milk under Thailand's tropical climatic conditions. However, in the summer when the Temperature-Humidity Index (THI) increased the milk production and reproduction decreased. In a comparative study of AFS cows from Malaysia, Australia and New Zealand, the research farm owned by the Division of Veterinary Services in Air Hitam, Malaysia reported that over 39% of the AFS cows produced more milk and its milk yield was superior to the local breeds involved in the study. In the beginning of the developmental phase of the AFS, Queensland reported that the AFS cows had lower levels of milk production as compared to the Holstein-Friesians, but despite this difference the AFS was still considered to the most ideal breed due to its overall performance. One of the main aims of the Follicle Stimulating Hormone programme was to produce genetically superior cows that were able to meet the milking production needs and hence the embryos of the top 25% of the breed with impressive milk production was utilized further in the development of the crossbreed.

Although numerous studies have concluded that the AFS has optimum milk production levels, there are also studies that suggest otherwise. For example, Edwards (1985) identified that the Sahiwal Friesian cows have displayed lactation failure in the beginning of its lactation period. In this study, a group of Sahiwal Friesian cows were tested to record its milk production, and, it exhibited low lactation performance and decreasing levels of milk production and continued to fail for 8 weeks straight, resulting in the milk production process to be ceased. Additionally, Peaker and Wilde (1996) found Sahiwal Friesian cattle to have short lactation periods that led to lactation failure and this was due to the unsuccessful milking process and sometimes milking was affected by factors like milk synthesis and secretion. In comparison, Veerkamp & Brotherstone's (1997) and Buckley et al.'s (2000) study deduced that cows with genetic superiority in terms of milk production have lower body condition scores during lactation and the Holstein-Friesian genetics contained lower body conditions that were ideal for optimum milk production. The genetic materials of the Holstein-Friesian was studied and the researchers concluded that with fine modifications to the genes, it displayed desirable results for milk production with improvements to its reproductive performance as well. Therefore this highlights the positive correlation between reproductive performance and milk production that was essential to the Holstein-Friesian genes. Although the Holstein-Friesian cows had the highest genetic material for milk production, it however left them susceptible to diseases like foot and mouth disease, foot rot etc.
