= Murray Grey =

Breed of cattle

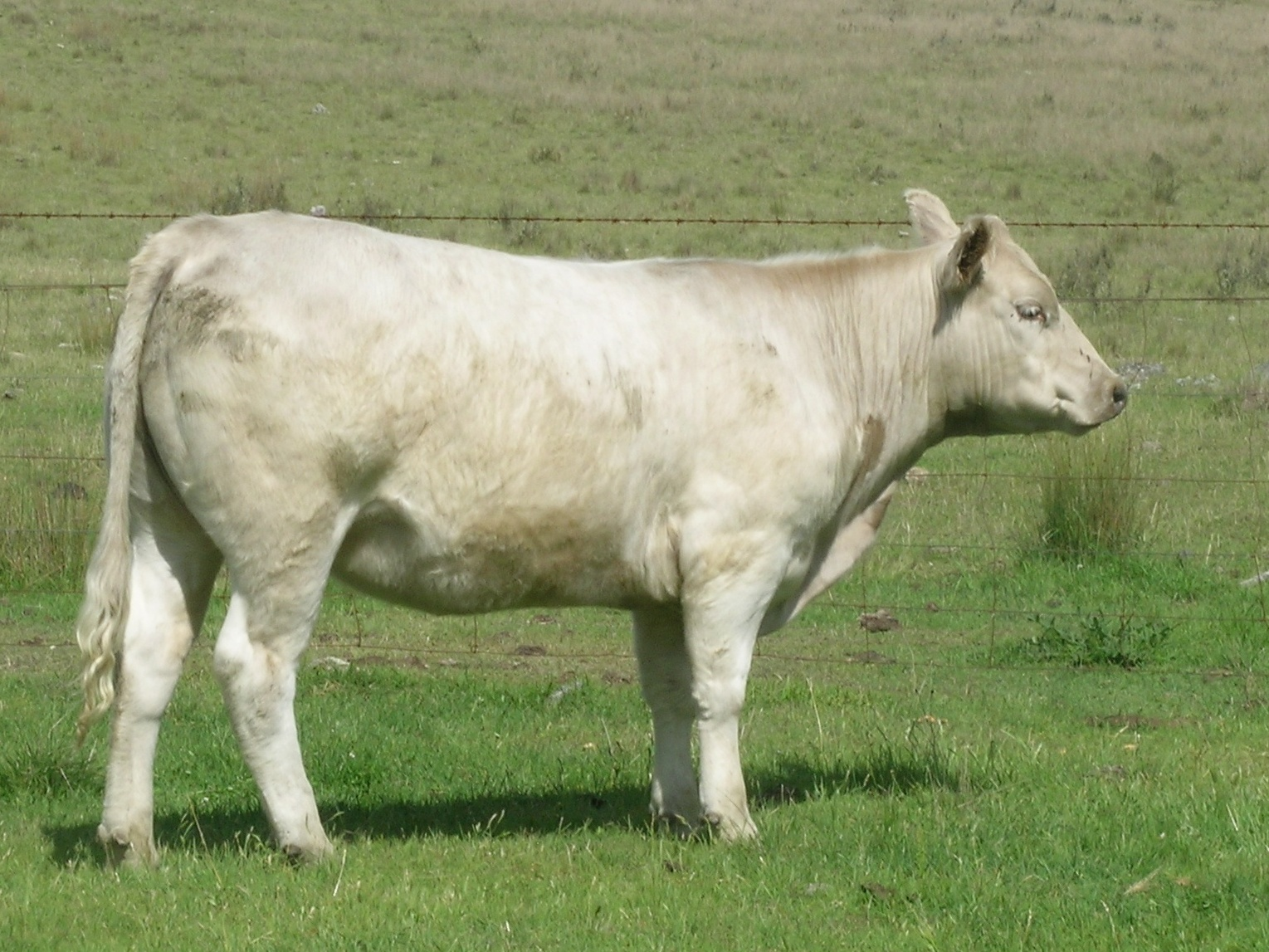
- A silver heifer
- Conservation status: FAO (2007): no data; DAD-IS (2022): at risk
- Country of origin: Australia
- Distribution: Americas; South Africa; United Kingdom
- Use: Beef

Traits
- Weight: Male: 780–860 kg; Female: 500–680 kg
- Coat: Dun, grey or silver
- Horn status: Polled

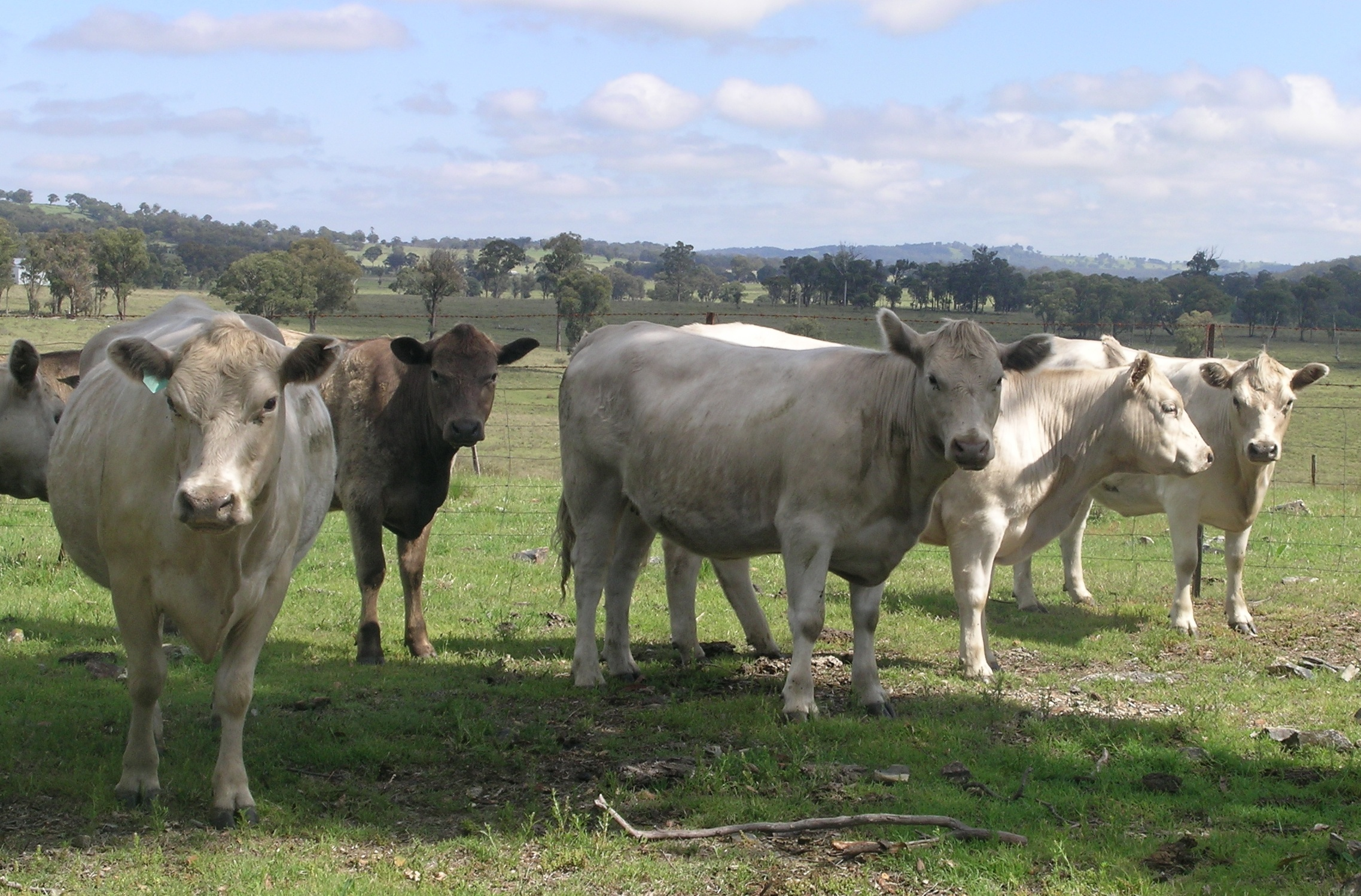
Yearling heifers at Walcha, New South Wales

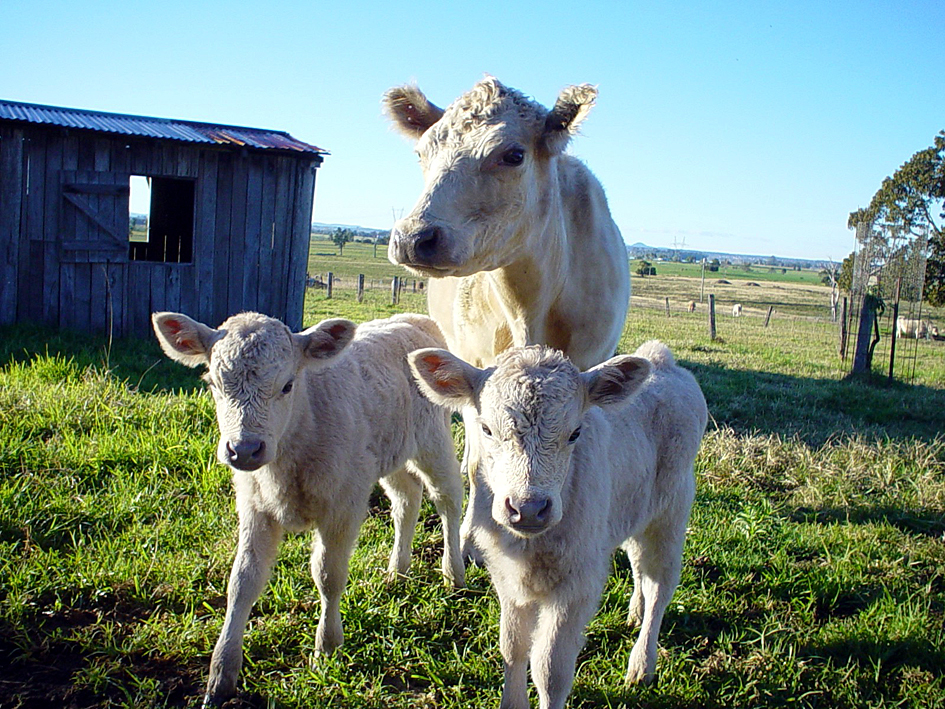
Cow and calves

The Murray Grey is an Australian breed of polled beef cattle. It originated between 1905 and 1917 in the upper Murray River valley, on the border between New South Wales and Victoria. It is similar in appearance to the Aberdeen Angus, from which it largely derives, but is grey, silver or dun in colour.

== History ==
The Murray Grey breed was developed from an initial chance mating of a black Aberdeen Angus bull and a roan Shorthorn cow in 1905 during the Federation drought. The resulting 13 dun-grey calves from these matings were kept as curiosities and then bred on the Thologolong property along the Murray River in New South Wales by Peter and Ena Sutherland.

They grew quickly, were good converters of feed and produced quality carcasses. Local cattlemen soon became interested in the greys and began breeding them. The first larger-scale commercial herds were established in the 1940s. In the 1960s, several Grey cattle breeders were selling them as a commercial enterprise and the Murray Grey Beef Cattle Society was formed to register the cattle and to administer the breed. Murray Grey registries are in Canada, New Zealand, the United Kingdom, and the United States. In New Zealand, Murray Greys have been favoured because of their resistance to facial eczema, which is a problem in other cattle breeds.

In 1963, negotiations were made to have the similar Tasmanian Grey beef cattle accepted into the Murray Grey, but the two organizations did not combine until 1981.

The Murray Grey Beef Cattle Society performance records the herd using the internationally recognised Breedplan for monitoring growth, milk, and carcass quality.

== Characteristics ==
The Murray Grey is of a moderate size, with sound structure and good walking ability. Bulls usually weigh some 780–860 kg, and cows some 500–680 kg.

Hair colour ranges from very light silver to chocolate or dark grey; a few animals are even black, but most are silver to a silvery-dun colour. This colouring is very dominant, so when crossed with another breed, the colour is grey or silver (light grey). Their skin has a dark pigmentation, which helps prevent eye cancer (ocular squamous cell carcinoma), photosensitivity reactions, and sunburned udders. They have performed well in snow country and in a trial undertaken at a commercial feedlot between December 2002 and June 2003 to determine the effect of high heat load on performance and carcase characteristics when fed a high-energy diet for 165–183 days. In this heat stress trial, they outperformed the other trialled breeds by producing the highest average daily weight gains over this period. Their superior performance in this trial was attributed to their lighter-coloured coats.

=== Carcase quality ===
In 1967, three carcases were sent to the United Kingdom to participate in the Commonwealth carcase competition at the Smithfield Show, where they took first, second and third place. In Australia, Murray Greys have dominated hoof and carcase competitions for many years.

The Murray Grey breed was the largest represented breed at the 2008 Calgary Stampede Carcase Competition. A Murray Grey steer was declared the Grand Champion Carcase there for the second consecutive year.

In 2008 or the first time in the history of the Midland Bull Test and sale in Columbus, Montana, a Murray Grey bull scored a perfect 10 on the genetic test for marbling and a near perfect 9 on the genetic test for tenderness. No bull of any breed has ever performed so well before.

=== Behaviour ===
The breed is known for being easy to handle, having a "docile and easy temperament".

== Distribution ==
Murray Grey cattle, embryos, and semen have been exported to Canada, New Zealand, South America, the United Kingdom, and the United States. Murray Grey cattle have also been accepted into the South African Registrar of Livestock Improvement's books. In Paraguay, Murray Grey cattle have been used in crossbreeding programs involving Zebu and Charolais cattle. The Zebu and Charolais cattle there lacked the dark skins and early-maturing traits of the Murray Greys. This crossbreeding program improved the fertility, calving ease, and weight gains of the progeny produced there.

== See also ==
- Greyman
- Square Meater
- Tasmanian Grey
