= Swift River (Jamaica) =

Coordinates: 18°12′N 76°34′W

Location
- Country: Jamaica

The Swift River (Jamaica) is a river of Jamaica. The river had massive floods during the 1930s {1932–1940}, which nearly brought the only major settlement, which shares the same name, to extinction.

== See also ==
- List of rivers of Jamaica
