= Coronel Pacheco =

Coordinates: 21°35′S 43°16′W

- Municipality
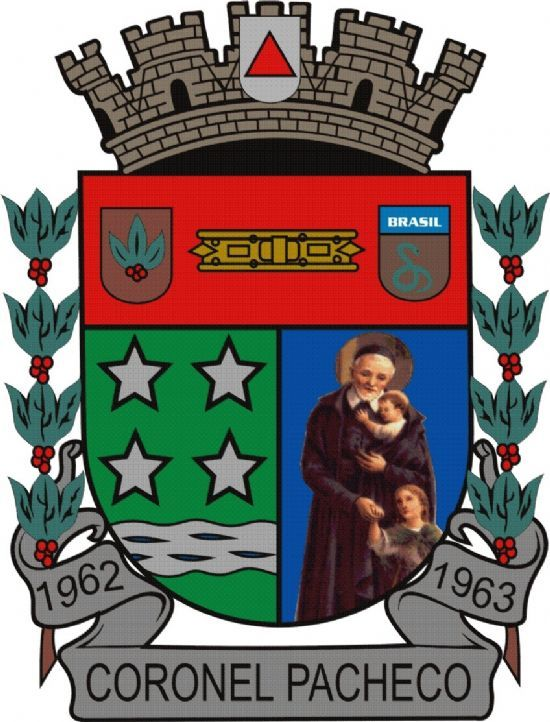
- Flag Coat of arms
- Interactive map of Coronel Pacheco
- Country: Brazil
- Region: Southeast
- State: Minas Gerais
- Mesoregion: Vale do Rio Doce

Population (2020)
  - Total: 3,090
- Time zone: UTC−3 (BRT)

Coronel Pacheco is a municipality in the state of Minas Gerais in the Southeast region of Brazil. The maximum temperature of 43.1 °C (109.6 °F) was recorded on November 18, 2023 in Coronel Pacheco.

== Geography ==
=== Climate ===
Climate data for Coronel Pacheco (1981–2010)
Month	Jan	Feb	Mar	Apr	May	Jun	Jul	Aug	Sep	Oct	Nov	Dec	Year
Mean daily maximum °C (°F)	30.2 (86.4)	31.0 (87.8)	30.2 (86.4)	28.8 (83.8)	26.7 (80.1)	26.1 (79.0)	25.8 (78.4)	27.0 (80.6)	27.2 (81.0)	28.8 (83.8)	28.9 (84.0)	29.5 (85.1)	28.4 (83.1)
Daily mean °C (°F)	24.2 (75.6)	24.4 (75.9)	23.9 (75.0)	22.3 (72.1)	19.7 (67.5)	17.8 (64.0)	17.4 (63.3)	18.4 (65.1)	20.0 (68.0)	22.2 (72.0)	23.0 (73.4)	23.8 (74.8)	21.4 (70.5)
Mean daily minimum °C (°F)	20.0 (68.0)	19.9 (67.8)	19.4 (66.9)	17.6 (63.7)	14.3 (57.7)	12.0 (53.6)	11.4 (52.5)	12.2 (54.0)	14.5 (58.1)	17.2 (63.0)	18.6 (65.5)	19.7 (67.5)	16.4 (61.5)
Average precipitation mm (inches)	355.1 (13.98)	195.1 (7.68)	220.6 (8.69)	79.4 (3.13)	42.2 (1.66)	19.5 (0.77)	12.6 (0.50)	17.6 (0.69)	72.3 (2.85)	103.7 (4.08)	206.1 (8.11)	296.4 (11.67)	1,620.6 (63.80)
Average precipitation days (≥ 1.0 mm)	17	12	13	7	4	2	2	2	7	8	13	17	104
Average relative humidity (%)	81.2	80.2	80.8	81.5	81.3	81.7	79.8	76.8	76.1	76.1	78.7	81.2	79.6
Mean monthly sunshine hours	157.9	186.0	190.6	192.5	182.3	187.6	191.8	204.8	150.5	163.7	138.3	134.7	2,080.7
Source: Instituto Nacional de Meteorologia

== See also ==
- List of municipalities in Minas Gerais
