= Military Farms Service =

- Military Farms Service Insignia
- Active: 1889 – 2017

Military Farms in India were set up to ensure a clean and continuous supply of cows milk to troops located in various garrisons across British India. After Indian independence, the Indian Army continued and expanded the service. The farms spread over 20,000 acres of prime defence land and had over 25,000 cattle. The 39 military farms are spread across India in cities such as Ambala, Kolkata, Srinagar, Agra, Pathankot, Lucknow, Meerut, Allahabad and Guwahati. But recently, after recommendations by the Shekatkar Committee, all military farms were shut in 2017, to cut costs and better utilise thousands of acres of prime defence land.

== History ==
The first Military Farm was set up on 1 February 1889 with the establishment of Military Farm Allahabad. Thereafter a large number of Military Farms were set up which at the time of partition numbered over 100 units mostly in the present Central, Southern and Western Command. With the formation of Eastern Command and Northern Command additional Military Farm Units were established initially on adhoc basis and then regularised by the Indian government in 1993 as permanent Military Farm units.

== Achievements ==
- The Military Farms Service were pioneers in the introduction of Artificial Insemination (AI) in cattle in India.
- The dairy development in the organized sector in India is attributed to Military Farms.
- 'Project Frieswal', a project to develop a cross-bred cattle has become the world's largest cross-bred cattle breeding programme.

== Decision to shut Military Farms ==
The Army decided to close down its military farms which house around 23,600 cattle with an annual production of over 33 million kg of milk, in two phases with the last farm shutting down by 2017. One of the reasons the decision was taken because it was seen that military farms were no longer needed due to the growing availability of quality milk and milk products in the civilian market. The personnel of the military farms will be progressively transferred to other wings and departments. All the farms are on defence land and these will be used for other defence purposes. 25,000 heads of cattle, which includes thousands of high-yielding Frieswal cows were given to Indian Council of Agricultural Research and different state governments for rearing.

== See also ==
- Indian Army
- Para (Special Forces)
- Indian Army Pioneer Corps
