= Tasmanian Grey =

Breed of cattle

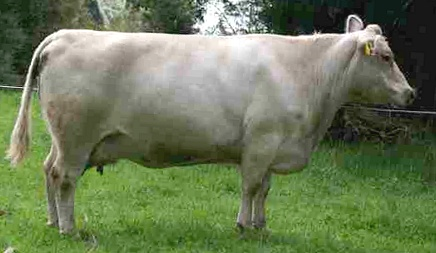
A Tasmanian Grey cow

The Tasmanian Grey is a polled beef breed of silver grey, grey or dun cattle developed in Tasmania, Australia, in the 1930s.

Bill Reed of Parknook crossed an Angus bull with a white Shorthorn milking cow that produced grey offspring. Having observed the superior milking qualities, docility, hardiness, and the ability of the grey colour to dominate after 20 years of breeding to Angus bulls it was decided to retain a bull calf in 1960. The bull, Parknook Thomas was mated to Angus heifers to form the nucleus of the breed. More cattlemen began breeding the Greys before the Tasmanian Grey cattle breed Society was formed.

In 1963 negotiations were made to have the Tasmanian Grey cattle accepted into the Murray Grey Beef Cattle Society, but it was not until 1981 the two organizations combined.
