= Slaughter-free milk =

ESG dairy product

Slaughter-free milk is a consumable milk produced from any mammal, normally cows, wherein the farmer does not cull the animal's offspring or, later on, the animal itself when it loses the ability to produce milk. Unlike conventional milk or even organic milk, slaughter-free milk never involves the killing of an animal, unlike most of the milk industry, which involves the culling of unproductive animals whose carcasses are either left to rot or used for the production of hamburger meat, veal or pet food.

By default, in the milk industry, if a calf is born male, it is culled, thus preventing the farmer from having to spend money on feeding an animal that will never be able to produce milk. After the cow is no longer suitable for milk production, it is culled as well. Slaughter-free milk is extremely rare. By not culling any animals, the slaughter-free milk becomes more expensive than the regular milk, since not only the farmer does not get capital gain by selling the carcasses, they also must keep up the infrastructure and conditions for the animals' retirement.
