= Greyman cattle =

Breed of cattle

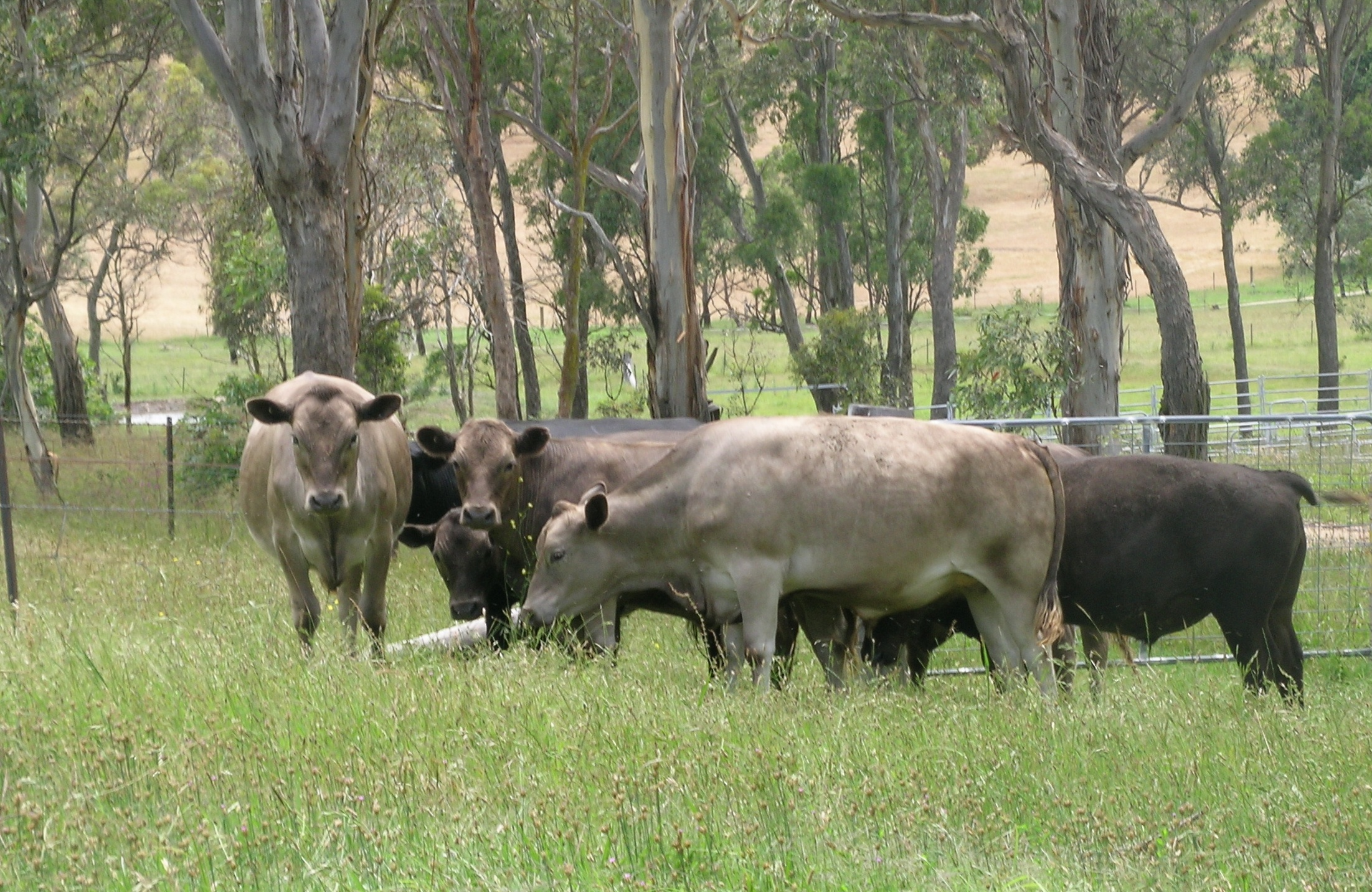
Greyman steers on the left and in the foreground.

Greyman are an Australian breed of beef cattle developed in Queensland in the 1970s, specifically to suit the Queensland environment, by combining the outstanding genetic characteristics of both the Murray Grey and Brahman breeds.

These cattle carry between 25% and 75% of Murray Grey blood, with the remainder made up of Brahman. This allows breeders the option of being able to select for optimal performance specific to the region and environmental conditions. Thus, Greymans can be bred with a greater emphasis on Brahman content in the tropical country, or with a higher percentage of Murray Grey blood to suit the southern states. Their sleek coats varying in colour from dark grey to a silver, the Greyman are natural polls and have a dark skin pigmentation that is not susceptible to skin or eye problems in severe climates.

Greyman cattle offer breeders natural tick resistance, good mothering ability, drought and heat tolerance and efficient feed conversion. They are among the breeds that have been GeneSTAR tested positive for carrying copies of marbling and tenderness genes.

Greymans were originally recorded within their own society, but the Greyman Society and its Herdbook were absorbed into the Murray Grey Beef Cattle Society in the mid 1990s, as part of the Murray Grey Composite Register. More recently a separate Greyman Register has been added to provide a more effective recording system.

The Greyman breed has attracted interest from overseas cattle producers as they are one of the few Australian breeds adapted to maximum performance and productivity under all conditions.
