= Australian Milking Zebu =

Breed of cattle

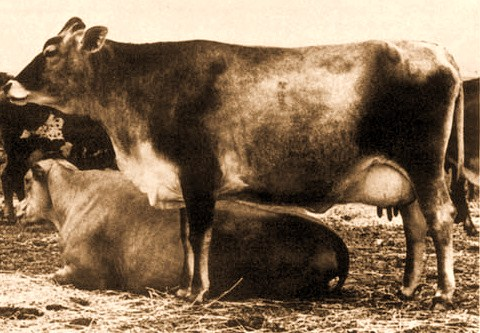
Australian Milking Zebu dairy cows

The Australian Milking Zebu (AMZ) is a composite breed of dairy cattle, developed by the Commonwealth Scientific and Industrial Research Organisation (CSIRO) in Australia during the mid-1950s. To develop the breed, the CSIRO bred Sahiwal and Red Sindhi cattle from Pakistan with Jersey cattle. Some Illawarra, Guernsey and Friesian genetics were also included. The development of the breed was governed by strict selection for heat tolerance, milk production and cattle tick (Boophilus microplus) resistance to result in the modern AMZ breed.

AMZ cattle have the color, markings and general shape of Jersey cattle, but also show their Sahiwal and Red Sindhi ancestry with their loose skin.

Cows produce approximately 2,700 kg of milk per lactation.
