= Sahiwal cattle =

Pakistani/Indian breed of cattle

Sahiwal
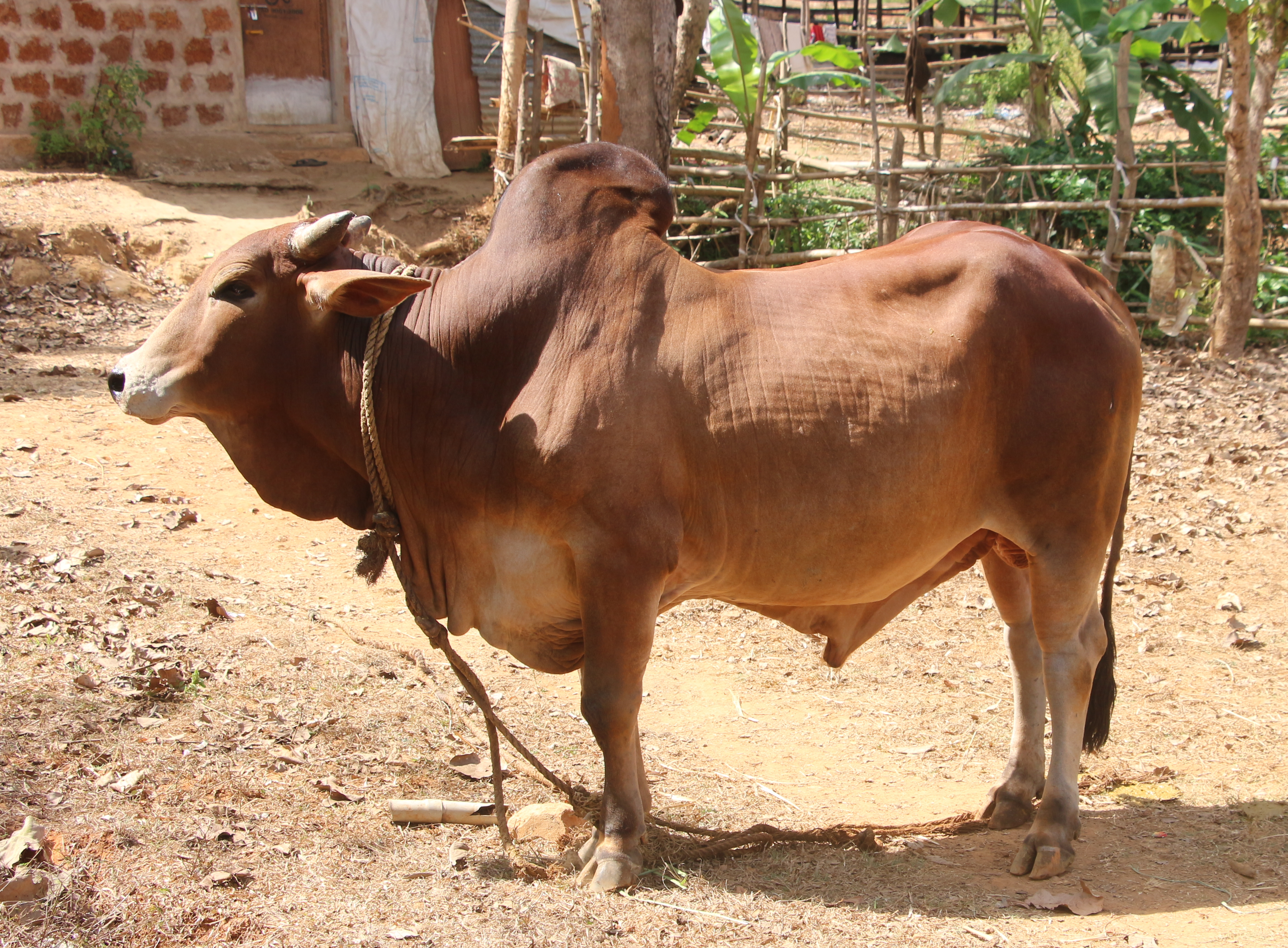
- A cow

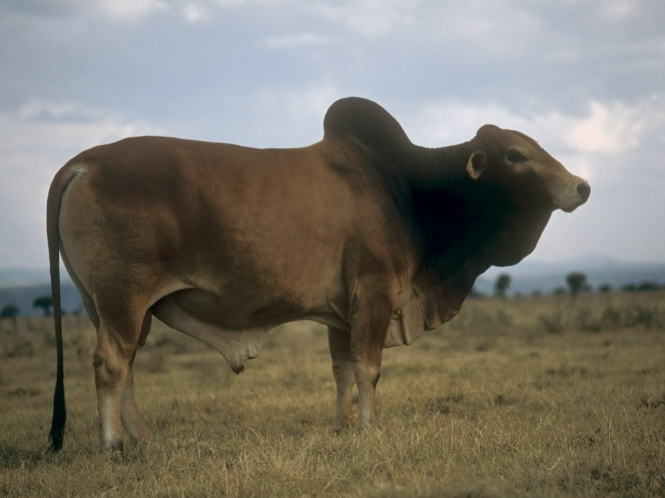
- A bull
- Conservation status: FAO (2007): not at risk; DAD-IS (2025): not at risk
- Other names: Lambi Bar; Lola; Montgomery; Ravi; Teli
- Country of origin: India; Pakistan
- Distribution: 27 countries in 4 continents
- Use: dairy; meat; draught

Traits
- Weight: Male: average 544 kg; Female: average 408 kg
- Height: Male: 170 cm; Female: 130 cm
- Coat: reddish dun
- Horn status: horned
- Cattle; Bos (primigenius) indicus

The Sahiwal is a breed of zebuine cattle indigenous to the Indian subcontinent. It is named after Sahiwal District of the Punjab province of present-day Pakistan, and is distributed mainly in that province of Pakistan and in the Indian states of Punjab, Haryana, and Rajasthan.

== History ==
The Sahiwal has been exported to many countries. These include: Burundi, the Comoros, the Democratic Republic of the Congo, Kenya, Mali, Rwanda, Senegal, Sierra Leone, the Seychelles, Tanzania, Uganda and Zambia in Africa; Bangladesh, Malaysia, Myanmar, Nepal, the Philippines, Sri Lanka and Vietnam in Asia: Australia and New Zealand in Oceania; and Cuba, Ecuador, Honduras, Jamaica and Trinidad and Tobago in the Americas. Seven countries have reported population data in recent years, and from this the world population is estimated to be about 4.25 million; Pakistan has not reported population numbers since 2006, when the total herd numbered over 2.75 million head. The large numbers reported may include cross-bred as well as pure-bred stock.

== Characteristics ==
The Sahiwal is of small to medium size: in Pakistan, average body weights are 544 kg for bulls and 408 kg for cows, while heights at the withers are 170 cm and 130 cm respectively; in India cows are reported to be considerably smaller, with an average weight of 327 kg and withers height of 124 cm. The coat is a reddish dun, sometimes with white markings. In bulls, the hump is large and may lean to the side; the crown of the head is domed, particularly in bulls; and the horns are small. It is a heat-tolerant cattle breed.

== Use ==
It is a triple-purpose breed, reared for its milk, for its meat and for draught work. It has been much used for cross-breeding, often with European dairy breeds such as the Friesian and Jersey. It has contributed to the development of a number of other breeds, among them the Australian Friesian Sahiwal or Australian Frieswal, the Australian Milking Zebu, the Australian Sahiwal, the Frieswal, the Jamaica Hope, the Karan Swiss, the Kenya Sahiwal, the Mpwapwa and the Quasah.
