= Dairy cattle =

Cattle bred to produce milk

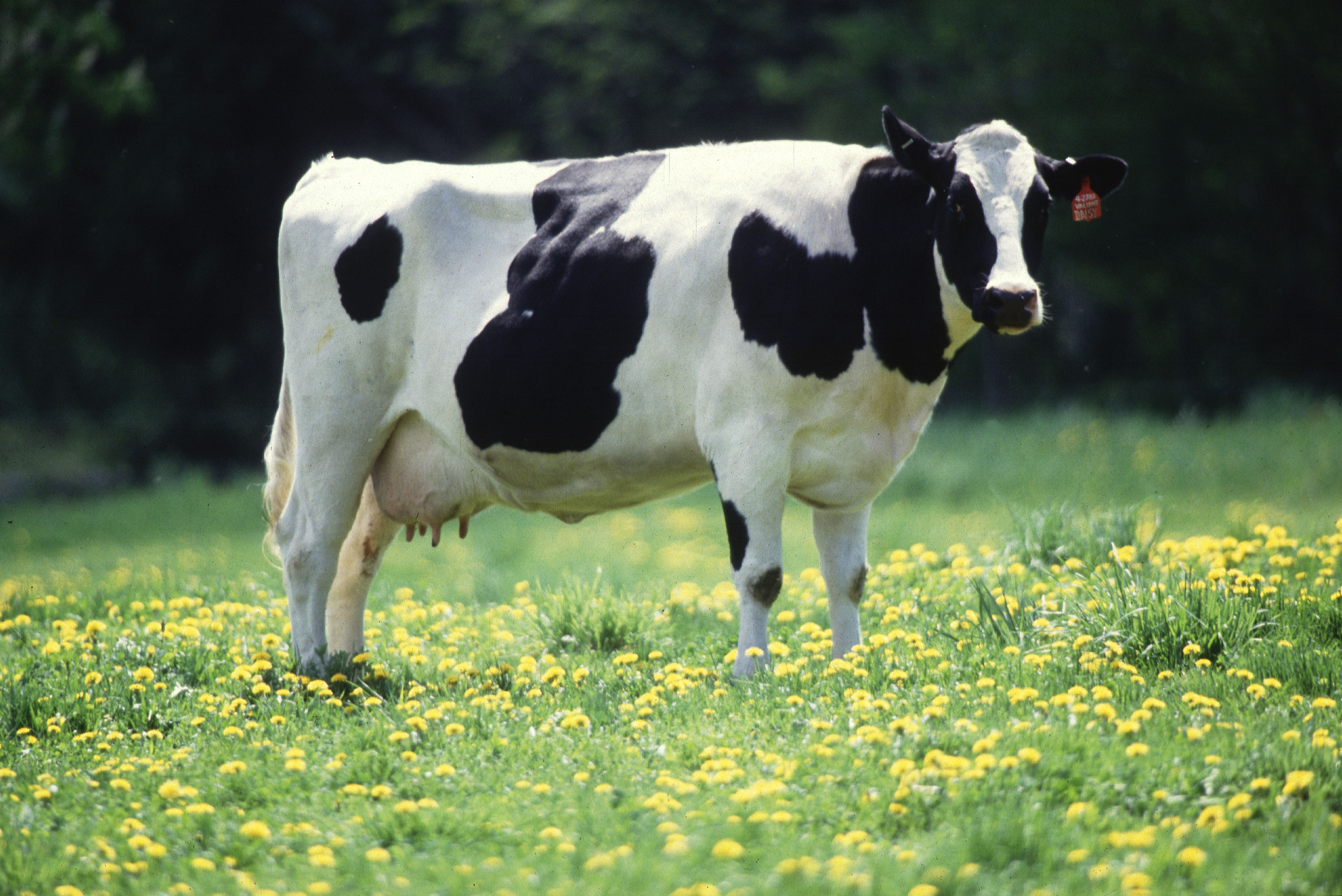
A Holstein cow with prominent udder and less muscle than is typical of beef breeds

Dairy cattle (also called dairy cows) are cattle bred for the purpose of producing large quantities of milk, from which dairy products are made. Dairy cattle are of the genus Bos and usually the species Bos taurus.

Prior to the 1930s, cattle were generally raised for multiple uses, including dairy, beef, and sometimes work as well. The same stock was often used for both meat and milk production. In the 20th century, the industry began to specialize its herds, with dairy operators favoring cattle breeds specifically bred for high milk production, most notably the Holstein Friesian. The other main contemporary dairy-focused breeds are the Jersey, Brown Swiss, Guernsey, and Ayrshire.

== Overview ==
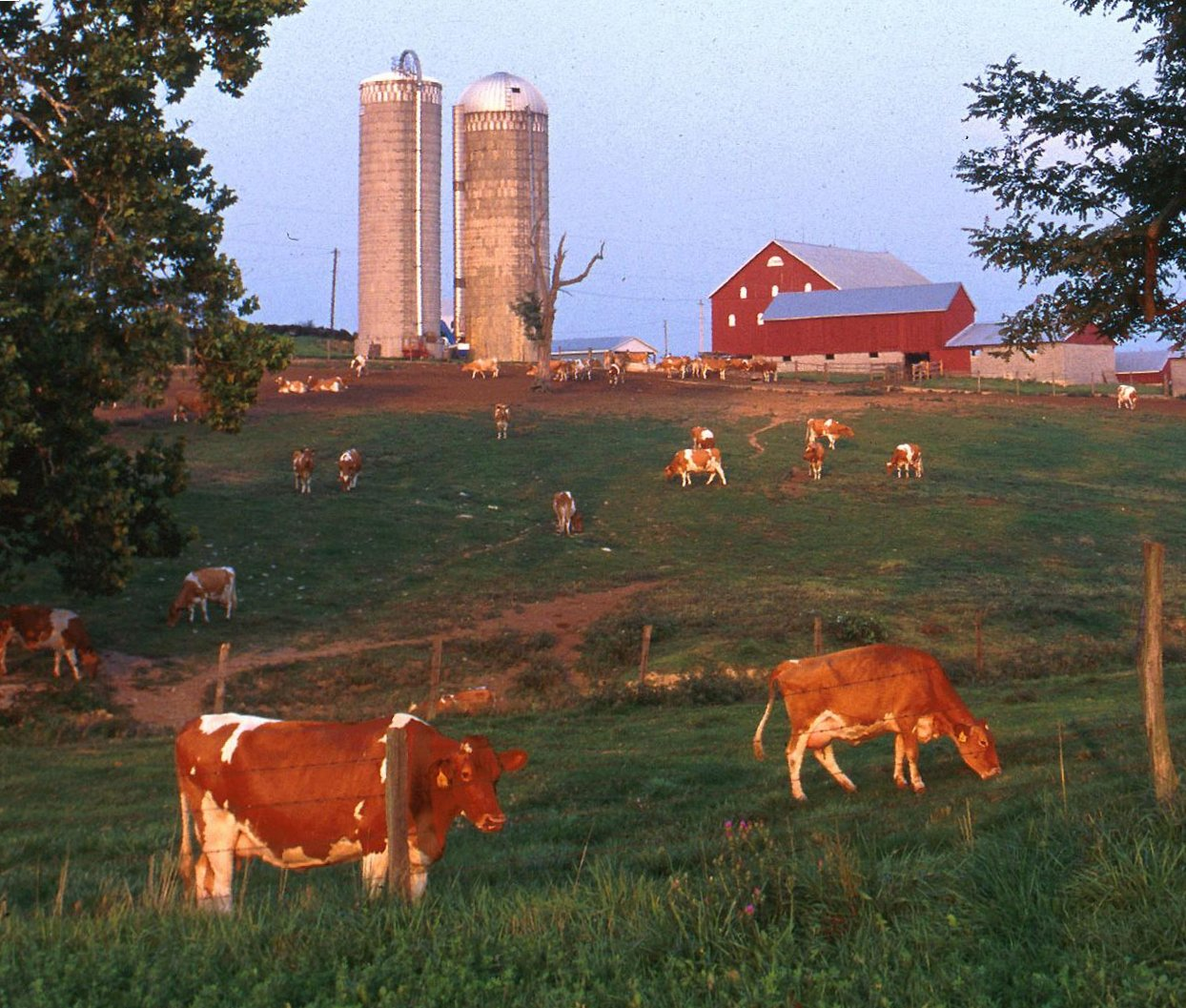
Cows on a dairy farm in Maryland, U.S.

Dairy cattle are the most common kind of livestock used in dairy farming, the creation of milk for commercial sale. In temperate locations, Bos taurus is the most common, while zebu (Bos indicus) are seen in some tropical regions. Dairy farming, like other livestock-rearing methods, can loosely be split into intensive and extensive management systems. Intensive systems keep cows indoors more often in pens and stalls, and manage their food intake closely with purchased feed, supplements, total mixed rations (TMR), and so on. Extensive systems allow cows to roam more freely outside on pasture, and are then herded to be milked. There are numerous gradations between regions and individual farmers, depending on access to cheap land for pasture, feed, and so on.

The lifecycle of a female calf to heifer to dairy cow follows this pattern, in general:

1. Calf: In the dairy industry, the calf is usually separated from her dam within three days after receiving their colostrum. They are raised on milk replacer, feed, or pasture instead.
2. The core cycle of breeding into milk production begins around 13–14 months old, and repeats until no longer economical:
  1. Breeding: The heifer (or cow on later cycles) is impregnated. In older, traditional systems, this is from direct "service" from a bull; in contemporary systems, it is largely from artificial insemination (AI). If more dairy cows are desired, she is bred with a dairy sire; if not, she may be bred with a sire from a beef breed.
  2. Calving: After a gestation period of around nine months, a calf is born. Female calves go to the first step to maintain the herd.
  3. Lactation: The cow produces milk for around 10 months. In nature, this would be for their calf, but in dairy farming, it is collected instead.
  4. Dry period: If cows are planned for another lactation cycle, they will be bred again during their lactation. Farmers will attempt to time the pregnancy such that the cows are given around 2 months off before their next calf is due, to allow some time to recover. The cycle resumes.
3. Culling: Once it is no longer economical to feed a cow compared to replacing her with a new heifer, a cow is sold and slaughtered. This is largely for their meat (beef), albeit at a lower price than specialized meat breeds, as they are generally turned into ground beef. Their carcass may also be used for rendering.

The lifecycle of a dairy bull calf is generally much shorter, as bulls cannot produce milk. Excess dairy female calves that cannot be supported by the facilities or pasture available also go to the alternate lifecycle. This cycle also applies to progeny of any sex from cows bred with beef breed sires to create beef-dairy hybrids.

1. Calf: Excess calves from pure dairy breed lines are generally sold as quickly as possible, for low value. Beef-dairy hybrid calves may be kept a little longer to ensure their healthiness, but most dairy farms do not specialize in keeping them for longer than a few weeks.
2. Feedlot (potentially preceded by backgrounding): The calf is fattened up, then slaughtered for their meat. Dairy bull calves are often sold as veal and slaughtered at a younger age than beef breeds. Hybrids are raised similarly to beef breeds and may be kept longer.

The milk collected from dairy cows are used for a variety of dairy products including the milk itself, cheese, yogurt, ice cream, and many more.

== Calves ==
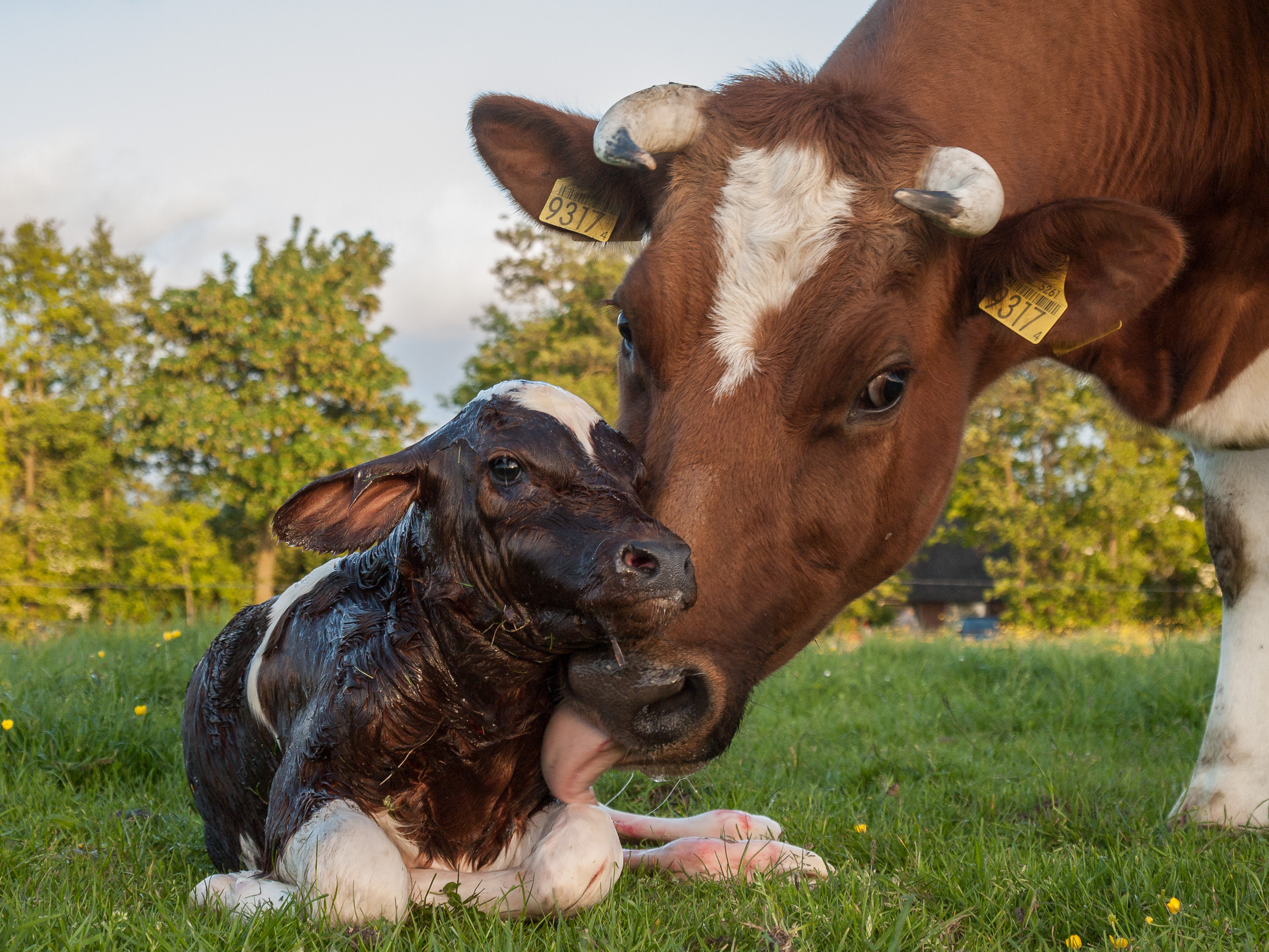
A cow with her newborn calf

Calves are young cattle before maturity. Most heifers (female calves) are kept on farm to be raised as replacement heifers, bred to enter the production cycle. Nearly all male calves and any excess female calves are sold on the market, usually by two weeks of age; males fetch a slightly higher price than excess females. Dairy calves sold for meat can be turned into veal, or for one of several types of beef production, depending on available local crops and markets. Bull calves may be castrated if turnout onto pastures is envisaged, to make them less aggressive, although holders might not bother for ones slaughtered very young. A tiny minority of bull calves, generally descended from elite cows with a proven track record of high volume lactations, may be put into progeny testing schemes to be considered for a life as a breeding sire.

Most dairy farms separate calves from their mothers within a day of birth to reduce transmission of disease and simplify management of milking cows. Studies have been done allowing calves to remain with their mothers for 1, 4, 7 or 14 days after birth. Cows whose calves were removed longer than one day after birth showed increased searching, sniffing and vocalizations. However, calves allowed to remain with their mothers for longer periods showed weight gains at three times the rate of early removals as well as more searching behavior and better social relationships with other calves.

After separation, some young dairy calves subsist on commercial milk replacer, a feed based on dried milk powder. Milk replacer is an economical alternative to feeding whole milk because it is cheaper, can be bought at varying fat and protein percentages, and is typically less contaminated than whole milk when handled properly. Some farms pasteurize and feed calves milk from the cows in the herd instead of using replacer. A day-old calf consumes around 5 liters of milk per day.

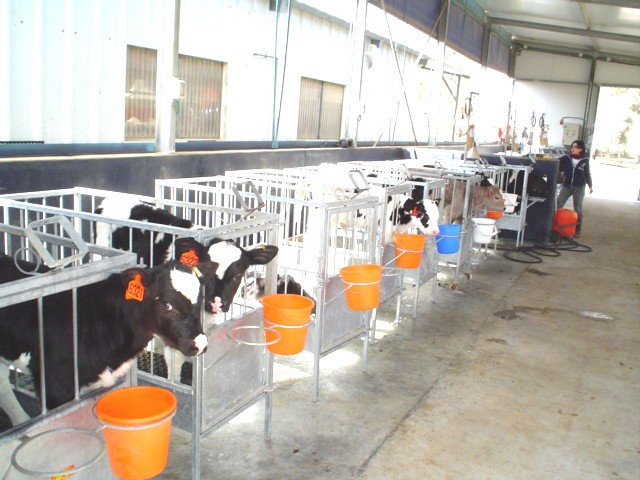
A 2005 example of calves housed in individual indoor pens

Calves are housed in different ways. Cattle are social animals; their ancestors tended to live in groups of mothers and offspring. The formation of "friendships" between two cows can be long lasting. Some 20th-century agriculture favored individual housing systems in calf rearing, to reduce the risk of disease spread and provide specific care. However, others have argued that grouping of offspring may be better for the calves' overall welfare. Social interaction between calves can have a positive effect on their growth. It has been seen that calves housed in grouped penning were found to eat more feed than those in single pens, suggesting social facilitation of feeding behavior. Play behavior in pre-weaned dairy calves has also been suggested to help build social skills for later in life. A study said that those reared in grouped housing are more likely to become the dominant cattle in a new combination of animals. These dominant animals have a priority choice of feed or lying areas and are generally stronger animals. For these reasons, it has become common practice to group or pair calves in their housing, whether they be outdoor hutches or indoor pack penning.

== Reproduction ==
=== Bulls ===
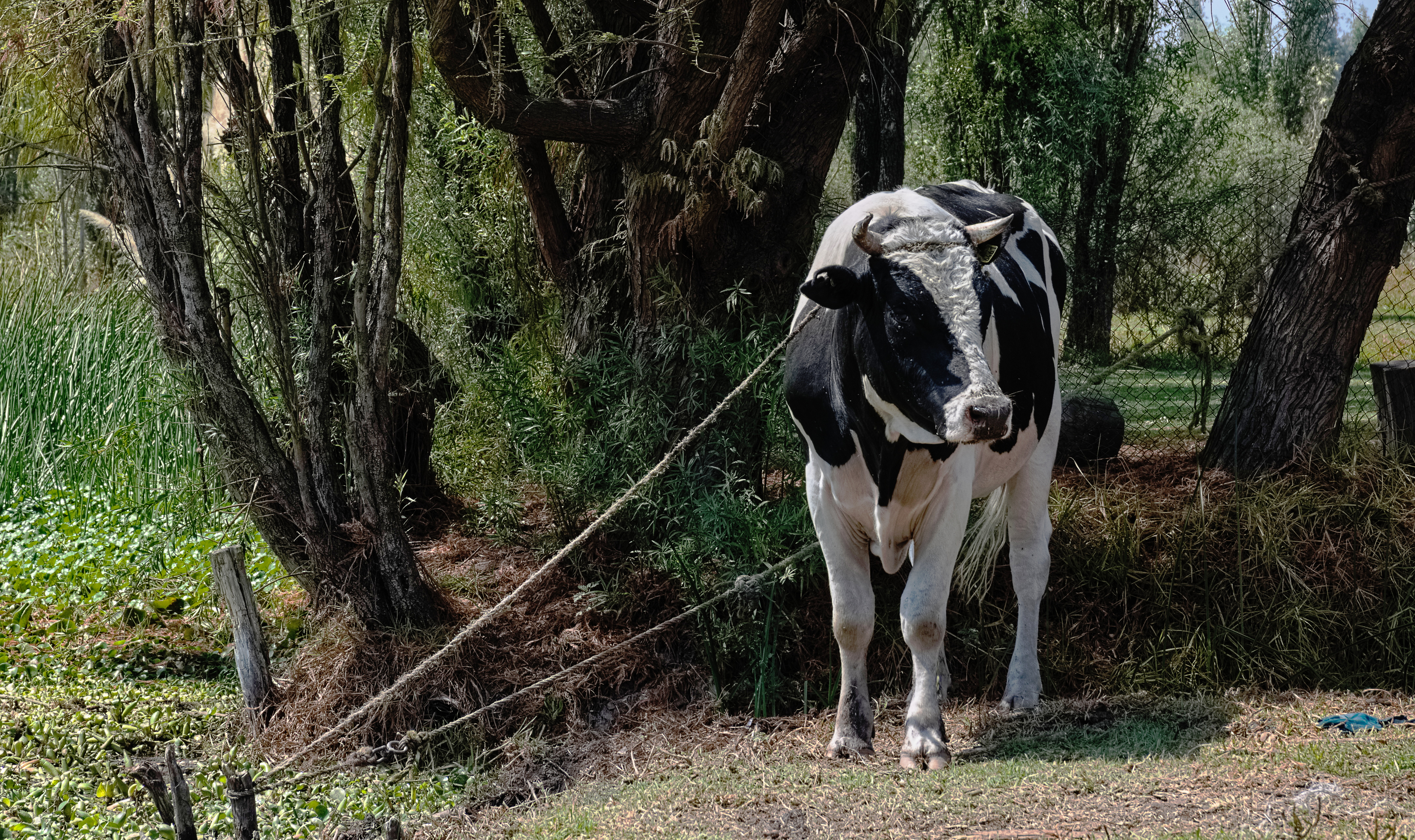
A Holstein bull in 2020

In traditional agriculture for most of human history, herds needed a bull to keep the cows in lactation and to produce calves. Small-time farmers with just a few cows would sometimes arrange bulls to be rented, transferred, or otherwise shared, as it might not make sense to keep and feed a bull for just a few cows. Still, fewer bulls were needed than cows, so excess bulls in the traditional system were still turned into meat, or castrated to become draft animals as oxen.

When bulls are kept for natural herd breeding ("service"), a ratio of one bull for every 15 to 25 cows is considered optimal; with more than about 50 cows per bull, fertility suffers and more cows "return to service" (need to be bred again). It is also considered good practice to rotate such herd bulls when possible, with agents arranging swaps to prevent inbreeding. When bulls are used directly, young bulls are preferred, as older bulls can have their temperament shift unpredictably.

During the 20th century, the popularity of keeping a bull directly on dairy farms rapidly declined in favor of the use of artificial insemination (AI). Bulls are dangerous and a source of injury to farmers and cows. They can damage fences. Farmers risk disaster if their bull becomes infertile or otherwise unfit for service. Additionally, direct use of bulls makes it easier for diseases to spread through a herd, such as the venereal disease Tritrichomonas foetus. The shift was sudden and dramatic. AI was first used successfully on dairy herds in the early 1930s, and the first AI cooperatives were founded in Denmark in 1936 and the United States in 1938; it became widespread after frozen semen was introduced in the 1950s. By the late 2000s, about 73% of pregnancies in American dairy herds came from AI and around a quarter from bulls ("natural service"), sometimes as a follow-up after AI had failed. In seasonally calving herds, as in New Zealand, cows are usually inseminated for the first four to six weeks of the breeding season, after which bulls run with the herd for a further six to eight weeks. Natural mating with beef bulls is also common when dairy cows are crossbred for beef.

Specialized dairy breeding farms, rather than production farms, are where breeding sire bulls are generally kept in the new system. These facilities possess the specialized setups for safely raising and monitoring bulls. These bulls provide the semen collected for artificial insemination of dairy cows. A single bull can serve far more cows this way than via traditional breeding, providing economies of scale. Semen from a single bull used for AI can supply some 30,000 inseminations a year, far more than he could manage by natural service. Bulls at AI centers are under continual veterinary surveillance.

=== Artificial insemination ===
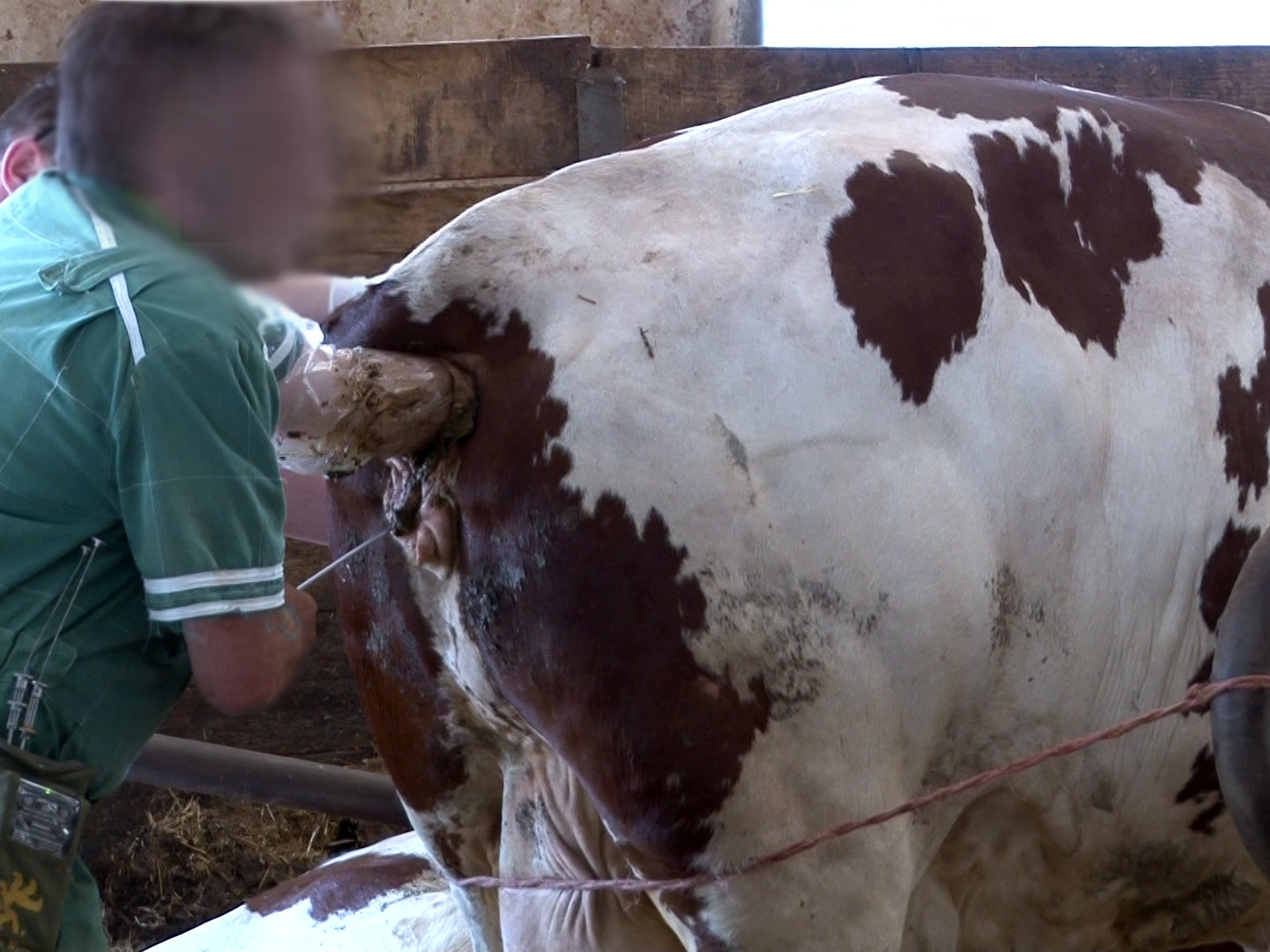
A cow being impregnated by artificial insemination

In artificial insemination, semen collected from a bull is stored frozen in liquid nitrogen and later injected into the cow's reproductive tract. To conceive, the cow must be inseminated near the time of ovulation, when she is in estrus and receptive to fertilization; farmers either watch for the signs of estrus or control its timing with hormones (synchronization). Advantages of using AI include its lower cost compared to maintaining a bull, avoiding the dangers of keeping one, faster genetic progress through the ability to select from a large number of bulls and access to the best genetic lines, and reducing the spread of disease. AI is much more widely used for dairy cattle than for beef cattle. It is harder to organize in some developing countries, where poor roads and the cost of transporting and storing semen are obstacles.

Dairy cattle are polyestrous; they are on a 21-day estrous cycle continuously throughout the year. For management purposes, some operations use synthetic hormones to synchronize their cows or heifers to have them breed and calve at the ideal times. A widely used protocol, Ovsynch, was developed in 1995 and allows cows to be inseminated at a fixed time without the need to detect estrus.

Estrus is often called standing heat in cattle and refers to the time in their cycle where the female is receptive towards the male. Estrus behaviors can include standing to be mounted, mounting other cows, restlessness, decreased milk production, and decreased feed intake. Detection aids include tail paint, which is rubbed off when a cow stands to be mounted, and activity sensors such as pedometers and collars.

As a result of long-term cooperation between the USDA and dairy farmers, the United States has since 1992 been the world's largest supplier of dairy bull semen.

A drawback of AI is that a few popular bulls can sire a large share of the herd, which can increase inbreeding. This can see harmful genes spread rapidly if incidentally attached to a star bull. For example, a mutation in the gene CWC15 that causes embryo death apparently arose in Observer Chocolate Soldier, a Jersey bull born in 1962 and a popular sire. He had more than 200,000 great-granddaughters, and by the time screening and mitigation efforts began, 20–25% of American Jerseys carried the mutation.

=== Embryo transfer ===
Embryo transfer (ET) is used to multiply the progeny of elite cows. In the traditional method, multiple ovulation and embryo transfer (MOET), the donor cow is given hormone treatments so that she releases many eggs at once, and is inseminated. About seven days later, the embryos are "flushed" from her uterus and transferred into other cows who serve as surrogate mothers. A treated donor yields about five transferable embryos on average, though the number varies widely. An alternate technique is to produce embryos by in vitro fertilization from eggs collected from the donor's ovaries. The gain is much smaller than with AI: a bull can have tens of thousands of daughters, but an intensive ET program is unlikely to produce more than about 50 daughters a year from one cow. With genomic testing making it easier to identify elite females, ET has become more important since the 2010s. Most bulls at AI centers are now themselves produced by ET.

=== Sex-selected semen ===
A major industry change starting in the 2010s has been the rise of the use of sex-selected semen. A 2025 estimate suggested that based on current trends, the vast majority (>90%) of dairy cows will be inseminated with sex-selected semen in the future. In it, semen collected from elite bulls at artificial insemination facilities is filtered for X-chromosome-bearing spermatozoa (generally via flow cytometry). Current techniques result in approximately 90% female calves from cows inseminated with sex-selected semen.

Conventional dairy semen produces roughly equal numbers of male and female dairy calves. Female calves are retained as replacements, while the surplus purebred dairy bull calves have low market value as beef. Crossbreeding with beef breed sires risked a shortage of replacement dairy heifers in the older system. With sex-selected semen, a farm can generate its required replacements from only the highest-producing portion of the herd (around 30–40% usually), and breed the remaining cows with beef sires to produce terminal beef-on-dairy crossbred calves. These hybrid calves command substantially higher prices at the slaughterhouse than purebred dairy bull calves.

== Milk production ==
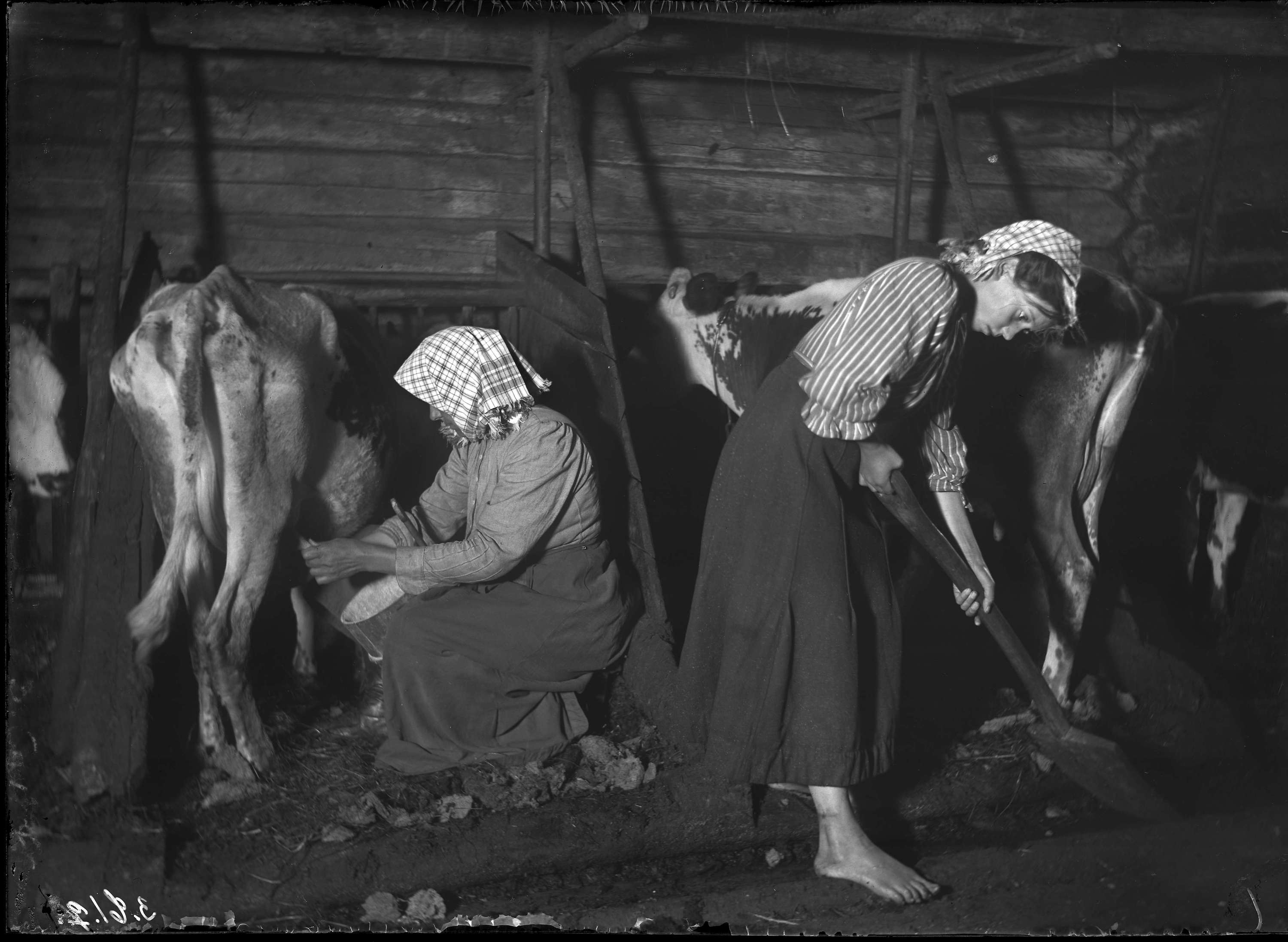
Dairy cattle in Mangskog, Sweden, 1911

A result of a cow having given birth to a calf is entering lactation, where the cow will produce milk for its offspring. This period is where the dairy cow provides the majority of her economic value.

Selective breeding has greatly changed the milk production rates of modern herds. Most dairy cows now produce much more milk than their young could possibly need in a situation in the wild. While a cow in lactation in the 1800s might be able to "dry" if abandoned by humans, a 21st-century dairy cow would suffer a more severe and potentially fatal health crisis if milking is neglected for too long.

Dairy cow production levels peak at around 40 to 60 days after calving. Production declines steadily afterwards until milking is stopped at about 10 months. The cow is "dried off" for about sixty days before calving again. Within a 12 to 14-month inter-calving cycle, the milking period is about 305 days or 10 months long. Among many variables, certain breeds produce more milk than others within a range of around 6,800 to 17,000 kg (15,000 to 37,500 lb) of milk per year.

The Holstein Friesian is the main breed of dairy cattle in Australia, and said to have the "world's highest" productivity, at 10,000 litres (2,200 imp gal; 2,600 US gal) of milk per year. The average for a single dairy cow in the US in 2007 was 9,164 kg (20,204 lb) per year, excluding milk consumed by her calves, whereas the same average value for a single cow in Israel was reported in the Philippine press to be 12,240 kg (26,980 lb) in 2009.

Dairy cows may continue to be economically productive for many lactation cycles. In theory a longevity of 10 lactations is possible. However, cows are usually culled earlier than this; the average herd life of a Holstein in the United States is fewer than 3 lactations. Cow longevity is strongly correlated with production levels. Lower production cows live longer than high production cows, but may be less profitable, due to consuming similar resources in pasture, medical care, and space.

=== Dry periods ===
The cycle of insemination, pregnancy, parturition, and lactation is generally followed by a "dry" period of about two months before calving, which allows udder tissue to regenerate, and the cow to regain certain depleted nutrients. A dry period that is too short can result in decreased milk production in subsequent lactations.

=== rBST hormone use ===
Farmers in some countries sometimes administer hormone treatments to dairy cows to increase milk production and reproduction.

About 17% of dairy cows in the United States are injected with Bovine somatotropin, also called recombinant bovine somatotropin (rBST), recombinant bovine growth hormone (rBGH), or artificial growth hormone. The use of this hormone increases milk production by 11%–25%. The U.S. Food and Drug Administration (FDA) has ruled that recombinant bovine somatotropin (rBST), recombinant bovine growth hormone (rBGH) is harmless to people, while the American Cancer Society finds that the use of rBGH can cause adverse health effects in cows. The evidence for potential harm to humans is inconclusive and requires more research. The use of rBST is banned in Canada, parts of the European Union, as well as Australia and New Zealand due to possible opposing views and of lack of findings.

== Health ==
=== Cow comfort and its effects on milk production ===
Jersey cattle lying down and resting, a positive sign of comfort

A comfortable cow yields better performance in milk yields and reproduction. Reducing an individual's welfare can also affect her efficiency and production, creating more cost and time on the operation. Farmers who strive to create a healthy, hygienic, well-fed atmosphere for their cattle thus benefit.

Certain behaviors such as eating, ruminating, and lying down can be related to the health of the cow and cow comfort. These behaviors can also be related to the productivity of the cows. Stress, disease, and discomfort negatively affect milk productivity. It is thus in the best interest of the farmer to increase eating, rumination, and lying down; and decrease stress, disease, and discomfort. Estrous behaviors such as mounting can be a sign of cow comfort, because if a cow is lame, nutritionally deficient, or housed in an overcrowded barn, its estrous behaviors are altered.

Feeding behaviors are important for the dairy cow, as feeding is how the cow ingests dry matter. However, the cow must ruminate to fully digest the feed and utilize the nutrients in the feed. Dairy cows with good rumen health are likely to be more profitable than cows with poor rumen health, as a healthy rumen aids in digestion of nutrients. An increase in the time a cow spends ruminating is associated with the increase in health and an increase in milk production. The productivity of dairy cattle is most efficient when the cattle have a full rumen. Also, the standing action while feeding after milking has been suggested to enhance udder health. The delivery of fresh feed while the cattle are away for milking stimulates the cattle to feed upon return, potentially reducing the prevalence of mastitis as the sphincters have time to close while standing. This makes the pattern of feeding directly after being milked an ideal method of increasing the efficiency of the herd.

Cows have a high motivation to lie down. They should lie down for at least five to six hours after every meal to ruminate well. When the lactating dairy cow lies down, blood flow is increased to the mammary gland which in return results in a higher milk yield. When they stand too long, cows become stressed, lose weight, get sore hooves, and produce less milk.

To ensure that the dairy cows lie down as much as needed, the stalls must be comfortable. A stall should have a rubber mat and bedding, and be large enough for the cow to lie down and get up comfortably. Signs that the stalls may not be comfortable enough for the cows are the cows are standing, either ruminating or not, instead of lying down, or perching, which is when the cow has its front end in the stall and their back end out of the stall. Dried manure, almond shells, straw, sand, or waterbeds are used for cow bedding.

Two types of housing systems are common in contemporary dairy production, free stall housing and tie stall. Free stall housing is where the cow is free to walk around and interact with its environment and other members of the herd. Tie stall housing is when the cow is chained to a stanchion stall with the milking units and feed coming to them.

Artificial light and daylight inlets have an impact on milk production and cow behavior. For cows in lactation a light program of 16 hours light and 8 hours of darkness is recommended, while for non-lactating pregnant cows 8 hours of light and 16 hours of darkness seem to be a better fit.

=== Nutrition ===
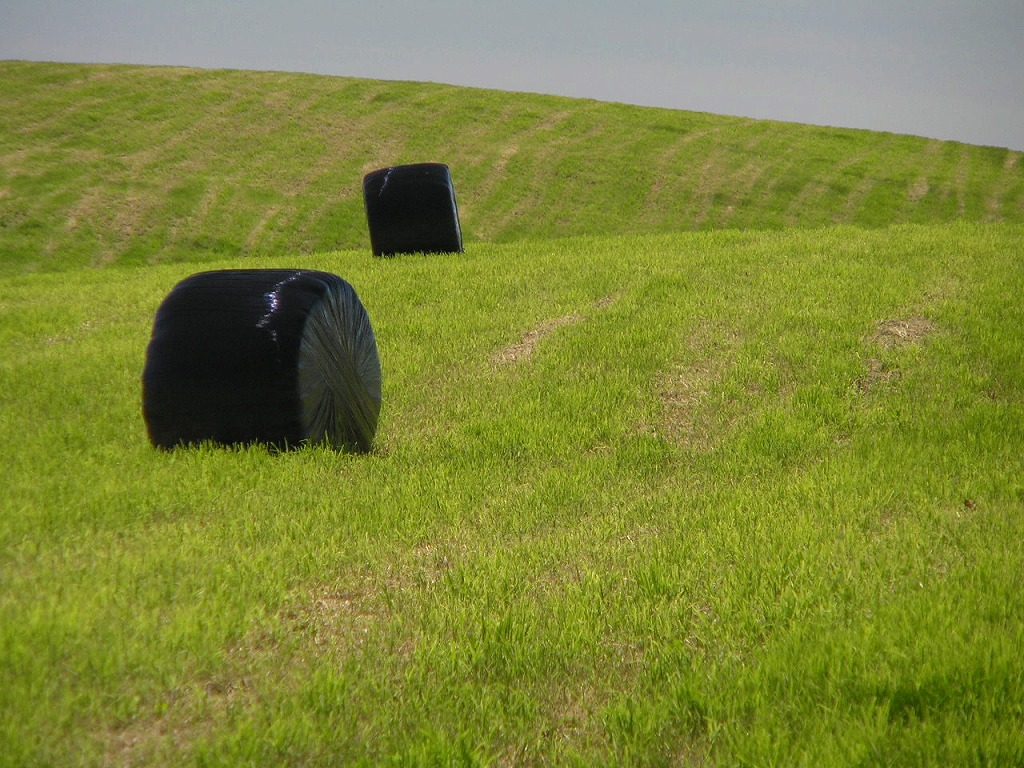
Silage bales in Japan

Nutrition plays an important role in keeping cattle healthy and strong. Implementing an adequate nutrition program can also improve milk production and reproductive performance. Nutrient requirements may not be the same depending on the animal's age and stage of production. Diets are formulated to meet the dairy cow's energy and amino acid requirements for lactation, growth, and/or reproduction.

Forages, which refer especially to anything grown in the field such as hay, straw, corn silage, or grass silage, are the most common type of feed used. The base of most lactating dairy cattle diets is high quality forage. Cereal grains, as the main contributors of starch to diets, are important in helping to meet the energy needs of dairy cattle. Barley is an excellent source of balanced amounts of protein, energy, and fiber.

Ensuring adequate body fat reserves is essential for cattle to produce milk and also to keep reproductive efficiency. However, if cattle get excessively fat or too thin, they run the risk of developing metabolic problems and may have problems with calving. Scientists have found that a variety of fat supplements can benefit conception rates of lactating dairy cows. Some of these different fats include oleic acids, found in canola oil, animal tallow, and yellow grease; palmitic acid found in granular fats and dry fats; and linolenic acids which are found in cottonseed, safflower, sunflower, and soybean.

Diets may additionally be formulated to strategically reduce methane emissions. Ruminants such as the cow have microbes in their rumen called methanogens which are capable of digesting down plant material so it can be utilized for energy, but also generates methane as a byproduct which is then released into the atmosphere by belching.

=== Antibiotics ===
Ill cows can be treated with antibiotics, in particular as a treatment for bovine respiratory disease ("shipping fever") and mastitis. However, cows undergoing antibiotic treatment generally are not allowed to sell their milk while the antibiotics are in their system. In the United States, the Pasteurized Milk Ordinance requires a milk sample is taken from every farm and from every load of milk delivered to a processing plant. These samples are then tested for antibiotics. Any milk testing positive is discarded, and the farm identified. Traceback to the dairy is undertaken by the FDA with further consequences including the possibility revocation of ability to sell milk.

== Lifespan and culling ==
Domestic cows can live beyond 20 years. However, those raised for dairy rarely live that long, as the average cow is culled once they are no longer an economic asset to the dairy farm compared to raising a younger replacement. Cows are removed from the dairy herd around age six on average, and sent to a slaughterhouse for their beef. In 2014, roughly 9.5% of the cattle slaughtered in the U.S. were culled dairy cows.

Cows are culled for the slaughter for a variety of reasons:

- Infertility: failure to conceive and enter a new lactation cycle. Cows are at their most fertile between 60 and 80 days after calving. Cows remaining "open" (not with calf) after this period may be a sign of poor health. Common causes of infertility include failure to expel the afterbirth from a previous pregnancy, luteal cysts, and metritis, an infection of the uterus.
- Mastitis: a persistent and potentially fatal mammary gland infection, leading to high somatic cell counts and loss of production. Mastitis is recognized by a reddening and swelling of the infected quarter of the udder and the presence of whitish clots or pus in the milk. Treatment is possible with long-acting antibiotics, but milk from such cows is not marketable until drug residues have left the cow's system, also called the withdrawal period. A farmer may decide it is simpler to cull an aging cow rather than cure her mastitis.
- Lameness: a foot infection or leg problems, which can lead to infertility and loss of milk production. High feed levels of highly digestible carbohydrates cause acidic conditions in the cow's rumen. This leads to laminitis and subsequent lameness, leaving the cow vulnerable to other foot infections. These problems may be exacerbated by standing in feces- or water-soaked areas.
- Production: Aging cows generally produce less milk per lactation cycle, while consuming similar amounts of feed and maintenance as younger cows. Once production drops beyond a certain level, it is cheaper to cull the old cow and replace her with younger heifers.

Cows are sometimes slaughtered while pregnant.

== Population ==
Cattle density (all breeds, not just dairy breeds) across the world, 2010

Herd sizes vary around the world depending on landholding culture and social structure. In 2007, the United States has an estimated 9 million cows in around 75,000 dairy herds, with an average herd size of 120 cows. The number of small herds has fallen rapidly, with 51% of U.S. milk in 2007 produced by the 3,100 herds with over 500 cows. Historically, the United States had even more cows in the past, with 22 million dairy cows in 1950, although the resulting output was smaller due to less efficient styles of dairy farming. The United Kingdom dairy herd overall has nearly 1.5 million cows, with about 100 head reported on an average farm. In New Zealand, the average herd has more than 375 cows, while in Australia, there are approximately 220 cows in the average herd.

The United States dairy herd produced 84.2 billion kilograms (185.7 billion pounds) of milk in 2007, up from 52.9 billion kilograms (116.6 billion pounds) in 1950.

== Breeds ==
Jersey cattle in rural Hokkaido, Japan

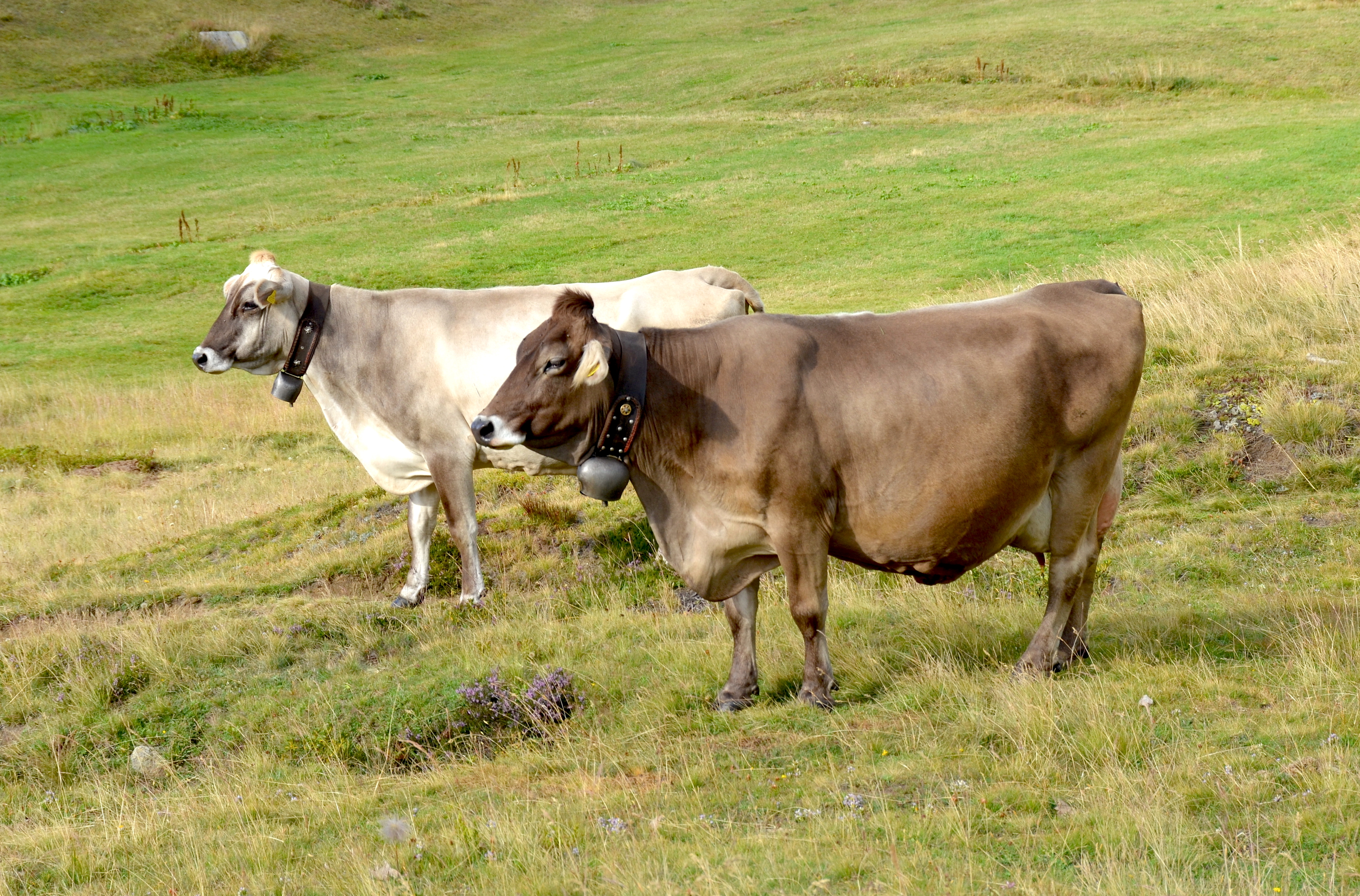
Swiss Braunvieh in the Alps

According to the Purebred Dairy Cattle Association, PDCA, there are 7 major dairy breeds in the United States. These are: Holstein Black/White and Red/White, Brown Swiss, Guernsey, Ayrshire, Jersey, and Milking Shorthorn.

Holstein cows originate from the Netherlands and have distinct black and white or more rarely red and white markings. Holstein cows are the biggest of all dairy breeds. A full mature Holstein cow usually weighs around 700 kilograms (1,500 lb) and is 147 centimetres (58 in) tall at the shoulder. They are known for their outstanding milk production among the main breeds of dairy cattle. An average Holstein cow produces around 10,000 kilograms (23,000 lb) of milk each lactation. Of the 9 million dairy cows in the U.S., approximately 90% of them are of the Holstein descent. Holsteins are around 93% of Canadian dairy cows. Canadian Holsteins have an annual production rate of 10,257 kilograms (22,613 pounds) of milk per cow, that contains 3.9% butter fat and 3.2% protein.

Braunvieh (the Swiss breed) and Brown Swiss (the American breed) cows are widely accepted as the oldest dairy cattle breed, originally coming from a part of northeastern Switzerland. Some experts think that the modern Brown Swiss skeleton is similar to one found that looks to be from around the year 4000 BC. There is evidence that monks started breeding these cows about 1000 years ago.

The Ayrshire breed first originated in the County of Ayr in Scotland. It became an established breed in 1812. The precise different breeds that were crossed to form the Ayrshire are not exactly known. Several breeds were crossed with the native cattle to create the breed.

Guernsey cows originated just off the coast of France on the isle of Guernsey. The breed was first known as a separate breed around 1700. Guernseys are known for their ability to produce high quality milk from grass. The term "Golden Guernsey" is very common as Guernsey cattle produce rich, yellow milk rather than the standard white milk other cow breeds produce.

The Jersey originates on the island of Jersey in the Channel Islands. Cows usually weigh some 350–400 kg (800–900 lb). The milk is rich and has a yellowish tinge; the fat content may exceed 6%. American Jerseys have been selectively bred for higher milk yield, and are often larger and coarser than the island stock.

== Animal welfare ==
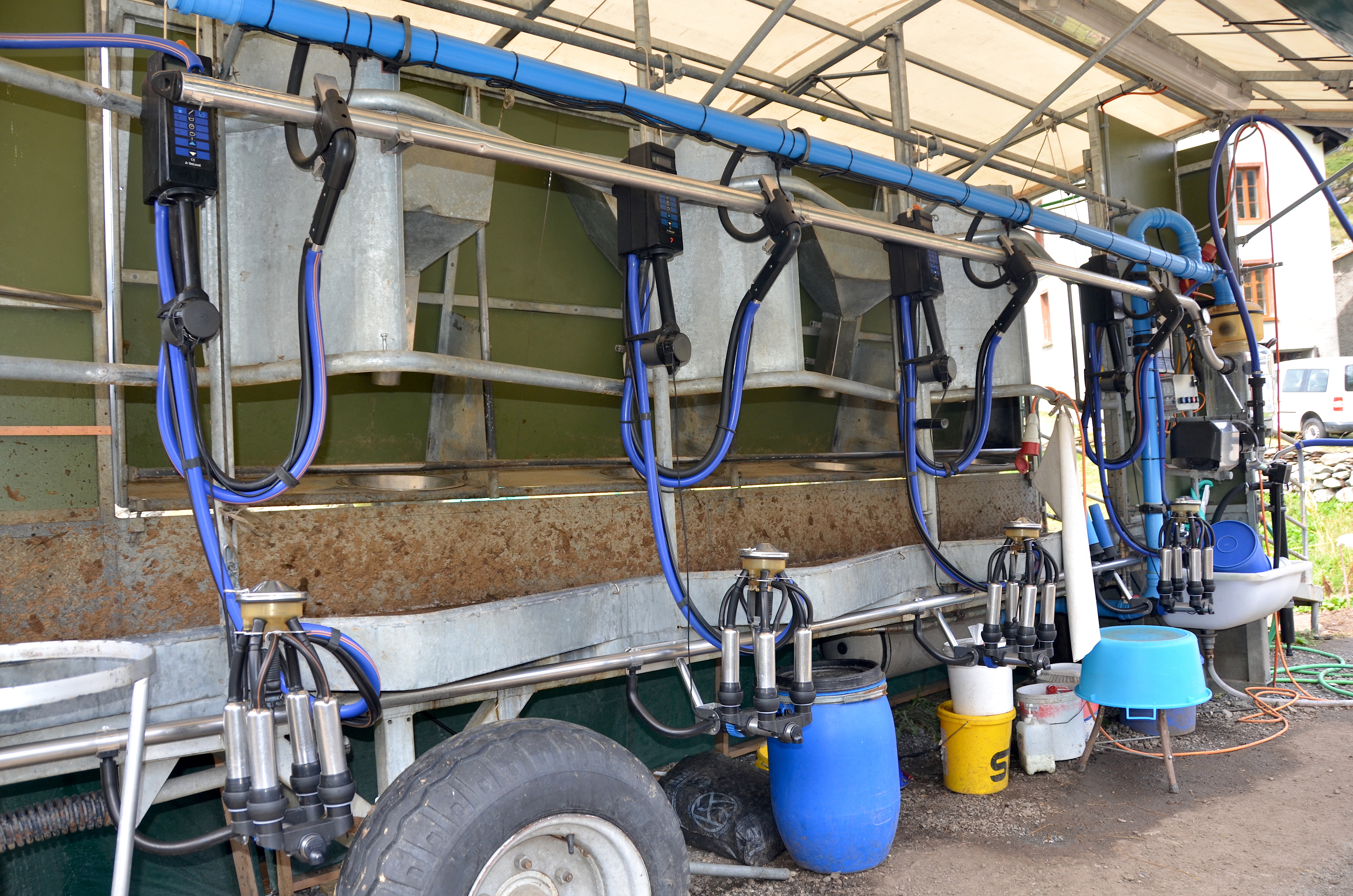
Mobile milking parlor for grazing cattle

Animal welfare refers to both the physical and mental state of an animal, and how it is coping with its situation. An animal is considered in a good state of welfare if it is able to express its innate behavior, comfortable, healthy, safe, well nourished, and is not suffering from harmful states such as distress, fear and pain. Good animal welfare requires disease prevention and veterinary treatment, appropriate shelter, management, nutrition, and humane handling.

Proper animal handling, or stockmanship, is crucial to dairy animals' welfare as well as the safety of their handlers. Improper handling techniques can stress cattle leading to impaired production and health, such as increased slipping injuries. Additionally, the majority of nonfatal worker injuries on a dairy farm are from interactions with cattle. Dairy animals are handled on a daily basis for a wide variety of purposes including health-related management practices and movement from freestalls to the milking parlor. Due to the prevalence of human-animal interactions on dairy farms, researchers, veterinarians, and farmers alike have focused on furthering our understanding of stockmanship and educating agriculture workers. Stockmanship is a complex concept that involves the timing, positioning, speed, direction of movement, and sounds and touch of the handler.

A survey of Minnesota dairy farms revealed that 42.6% of workers learned stockmanship techniques from family members, and 29.9% had participated in stockmanship training. However, as the growing U.S. dairy industry increasingly relies on an immigrant workforce, stockmanship training and education resources become more pertinent. Clearly communicating and managing a large culturally diverse workforce brings new challenges such as language barriers and time limitations.

The rapid separation of newborn calves from their dams has also raised concerns. Farmers sometimes argue the mother/calf bond intensifies over time and delayed separation can cause even more stress on both cow and calf. Conversely, a 2019 review found the effects on behavior were worsened with earlier cow-calf separation.

The practice of dairy production has been criticized by animal rights proponents. Some of the ethical reasons regarding dairy production cited include how often the dairy cattle are impregnated needed to produce milk, the separation of calves from their mothers to obtain the milk meant for their calves and the fact that dairy cows are considered "spent" and culled at a relatively young age, another reason is that most male calves are of no use to the dairy industry and are sold for beef or veal, as well as environmental concerns regarding any cattle production.

A small market exists for slaughter-free milk, which increases costs but gives spent cows a retirement rather than the slaughterhouse. This method of production has been criticized for higher methane emissions and dedicating land to pasturage that could be left fallow or to nature.

== Bibliography ==
- Beede, David K., ed. (2017). Large Dairy Herd Management (3rd ed.). American Dairy Science Association. ISBN 978-0-9634491-3-9.
- Phillips, Clive J. C. (2018). Principles of Cattle Production (3rd ed.). CABI. ISBN 978-1-78639-270-1.
