= List of North American cattle breeds =

This is a list of some of the cattle breeds considered in Canada and the United States to originate wholly or partly in those countries. Some may have complex or obscure histories, so inclusion here does not necessarily imply that a breed is predominantly or exclusively North American.

Name	Other names, if any	Notes	Image
American Angus			
American Brahman			
American Breed			
American Milking Devon			
American White Park			
Ankole-Watusi			
Barzona			
Beefalo			
Beefmaster			
Braford			
Brangus			
Brown Swiss			
Canadienne			
Chirikof Island			
Corriente			
Dutch Belted			
Florida Cracker			
Hays Converter			
Holstein			
Lynch Lineback			
Pineywoods			
Randall Lineback			
Red Angus			
Red Brangus			
Santa Gertrudis			
Senepol			
Simbrah			
Speckle Park			
Texas Longhorn			
