= Beef cattle =

Type of cattle

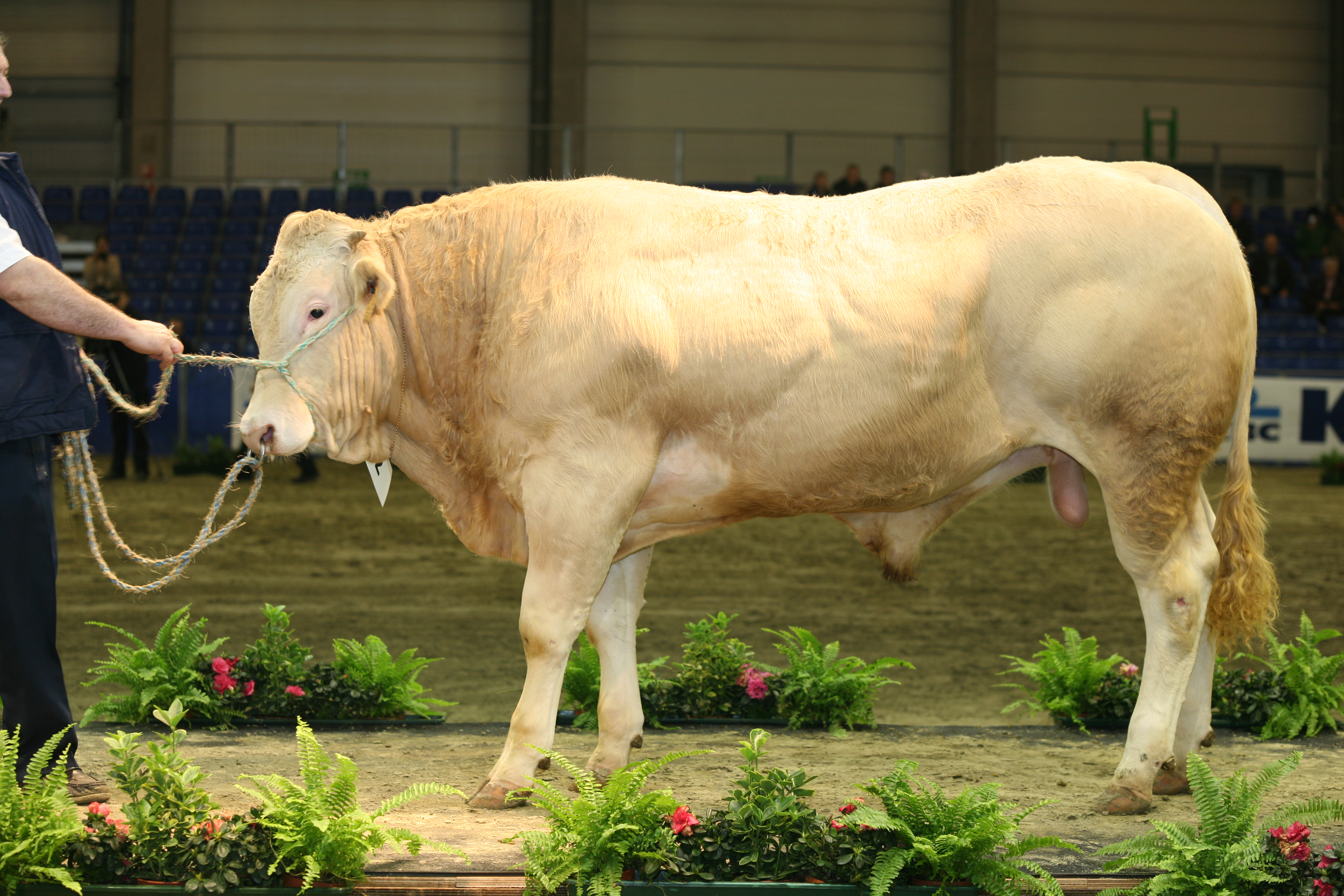
A young bull of the Blonde d'Aquitaine breed.

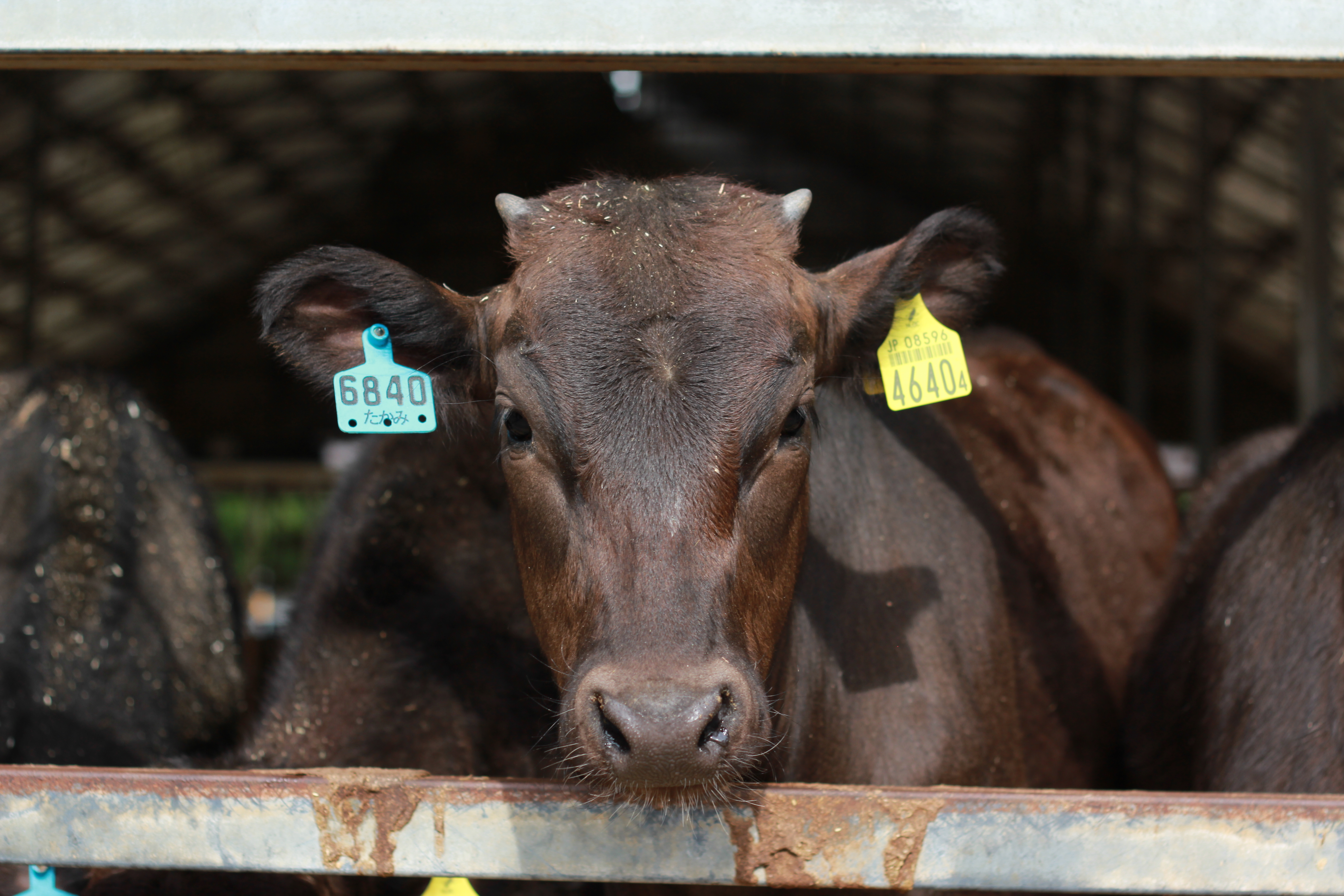
Japanese wagyu bull on a farm north of Kobe

Beef cattle are cattle raised for meat production (as distinguished from dairy cattle, used for milk production). The meat of mature or almost mature cattle is usually known as beef. In beef production there are three main stages: cow-calf operations, backgrounding, and feedlot operations. The production cycle of the animals starts at cow-calf operations; this operation is designed specifically to breed cows for their offspring. From here the calves are backgrounded for a feedlot. Animals grown specifically for the feedlot are known as feeder cattle, the goal of these animals is fattening. Animals not grown for a feedlot are typically female and are commonly known as replacement heifers. While the principal use of beef cattle is meat production, other uses include leather, and beef by-products used in candy, shampoo, cosmetics, and insulin.

== Calving and breeding ==
Besides breeding to meet the demand for beef production, owners also use selective breeding to attain specific traits in their beef cattle. An example of a desired trait could be leaner meat or resistance to illness. Breeds known as dual-purpose are also used for beef production. These breeds have been selected for two purposes at once, such as both beef and dairy production, or both beef and draught. Dual-purpose breeds include many of the Zebu breeds of India such as Tharparkar and Ongole Cattle. There are multiple continental breeds that were bred for this purpose as well. The original Simmental/Fleckvieh from Switzerland is a prime example. Not only are they a dual-purpose breed for beef and dairy, but in the past they were also used for draught. However, throughout the generations, the breed has diverged into two groups through selective breeding.

Most beef cattle are mated naturally, whereby a bull is released into a herd of cows approximately 55 days after the calving period, depending on the cows' body condition score (BCS). If it was a cow's first time calving, she will take longer to re-breed by at least 10 days. However, beef cattle can also be bred through artificial insemination, depending on the cow and the size of the herd. Cattle are normally bred during the summer so that calving may occur the following spring. However, cattle breeding can occur at other times of year. Depending on the operation, calving may occur all year round. Owners can select the breeding time based on a number of factors, including reproductive performance, seasonal cattle pricing and handling facilities.

== Cattle maintenance ==
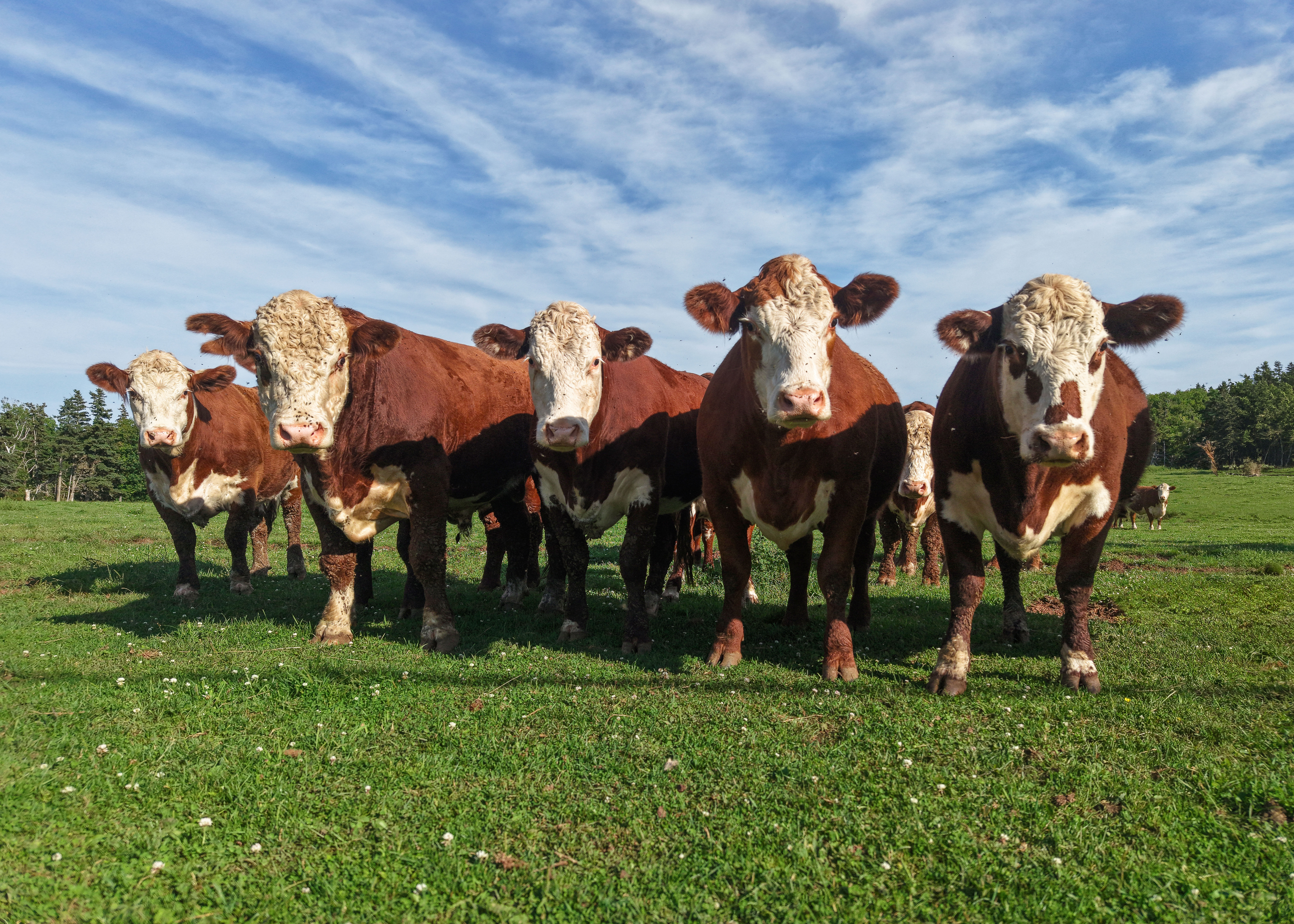
A herd of Hereford cattle in a pasture

Cattle handlers are expected to maintain a low-stress environment for their herds, involving constant safety, health, comfort, nourishment and humane handling. According to the Canadian National Farm Animal Care Council, beef cattle must have access to shelter from extreme weather, safe handling and equipment, veterinary care and humane slaughter. If an animal is infected or suspected to have an illness, it is the responsibility of the owners to report it immediately to a practicing veterinarian for either treatment or euthanasia. Depending on a multitude of factors (season, type of production system, stocking density, etc.), illness and disease can spread quickly through the herd from animal to animal. Owners are expected to monitor their cattle's condition regularly for early detection and treatment, as some cattle illnesses can threaten both cattle and human health (known as zoonotic) as witnessed with Mad cow disease and Tuberculosis.

On average, cattle will consume 1.4 to 4% of their body weight daily. There is a range of types of feed available for these animals. The standard text in the United States, Nutrient Requirements of Beef Cattle, has been through eight editions over at least 70 years ago. The 1996 seventh edition substituted the concept of metabolizable protein for the sixth edition's crude protein. In the 20th century, Canadian practice followed the American guidance. Already in 1970, the Food and Drug Administration was regulating pharmaceutical supplements in beef cattle feed such as hormones and prophylactic antibiotics.

Some animals live on pasture their entire lives and therefore only experience fresh grass; these are typically cow-calf operations in more tropical climates. Backgrounded calves and feedlot animals tend to have different diets that contain more grain than the pasture type. Grain is more expensive than pasture, but the animals grow faster with the higher protein levels. Since cattle are herbivores and need roughage in their diet, silage, hay and/or haylage are all viable feed options. Despite this, 3/4 of the 32 pounds (14.52 kg) of feed cattle consume each day will be corn. Cattle weighing 1,000 lbs. will drink an average of 41 L a day, and approximately 82 L in hot weather. They need a constant supply of good quality feed and potable water according to the 5 Freedoms of Animal Welfare.

Most beef cattle are finished in feedlots. The first feedlots were constructed in the early 1950s. Some of these feedlots grew so large that they warranted a new designation, "Concentrated Animal Feeding Operation" (CAFO). Most American beef cattle spend the last half of their lives in a CAFO.

== Cattle processing ==
A steer that weighs 1,000 lb (450 kg) when alive makes a carcass weighing approximately 615 lb (280 kg) once the blood, head, hooves, skin, offal and guts are removed. The carcass is then hung in a cold room for between one and four weeks, during which time it loses some weight as water dries from the meat. It is then deboned and cut by a butcher or packing house, with the finished carcass resulting in approximately 430 lb (200 kg) of beef. Depending on what cuts of meat are desired, there is a scale of marbled meat used to determine the quality. Marbling is the fat that is within the muscle, not around it. The more marbled a cut is, the higher it will grade and be worth.

Slaughtering of livestock has three distinct stages: preslaughter handling, stunning, and slaughtering. The biggest concern is preslaughter handling: how the animal is treated before it is stunned and slaughtered. Stress at this time can cause adverse effects on the meat, but water access and lower stocking densities have been allowed to minimize this. However, access to feed is restricted for 12–24 hours prior to slaughtering for ease of evisceration. Stunning is done when the animal is restrained in a chute so movement is limited. Once restrained the animal can be stunned in one of three methods: penetrating captive bolt, non-penetrating captive bolt, and gunshot. Most abattoirs use captive bolts instead of guns. Stunning ensures the animal feels no pain during slaughtering and reduces the animal's stress, therefore increasing the quality of meat. The final step is slaughtering. Typically the animal will be hung by its back leg and its throat will be slit to allow exsanguination. The hide will be removed for further processing at this point and the animal will be broken down with evisceration and decapitation. The carcass will be placed in a cooler for 24–48 hours prior to the meat being cut.

== Environmental impact ==
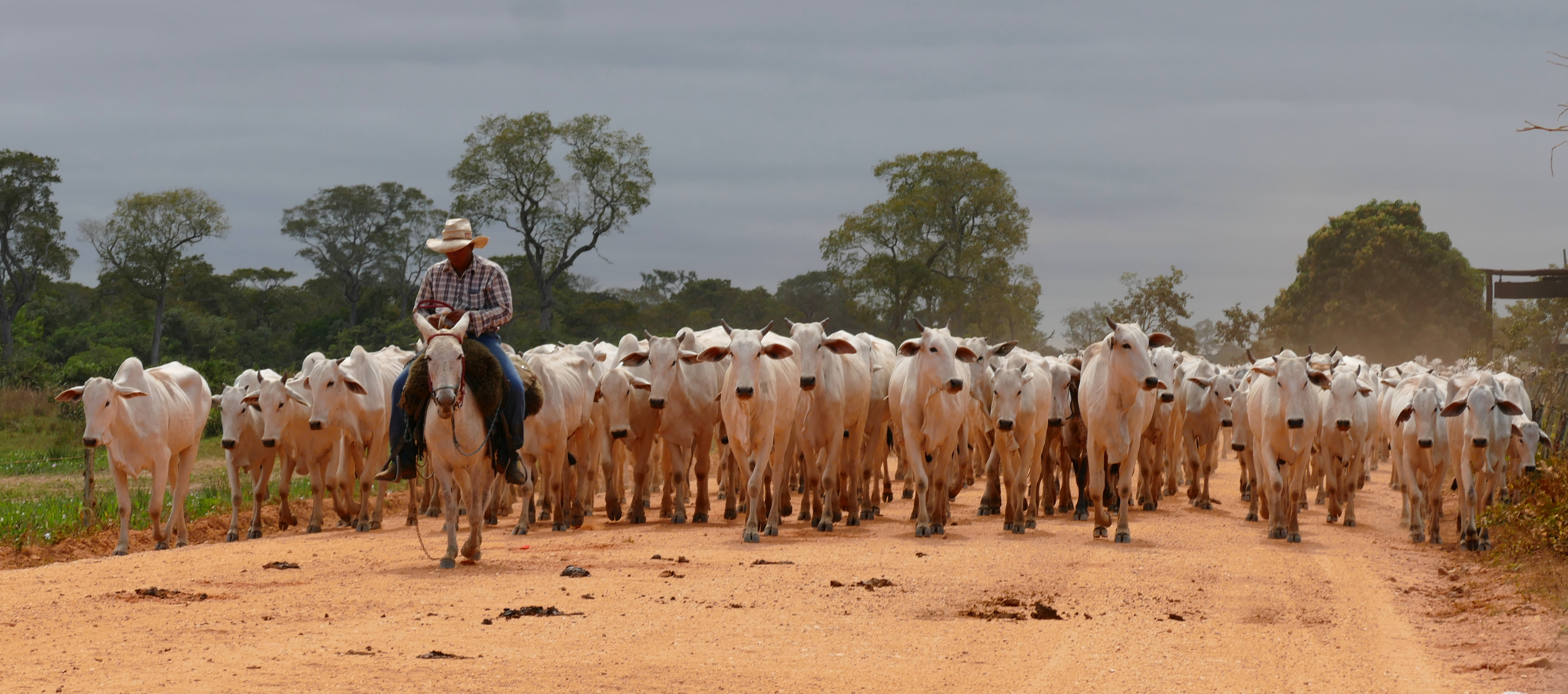
Cattle in the Brazilian state of Mato Grosso

Cattle farming is one of the most emissive forms of food generation, and least effective uses of land and water as resources. Cattle emit large amounts of methane resulting from their digestive process, and the process of preparing and transporting beef results in a high output of carbon dioxide. Multiple global agencies and governments, including the United Nations, have cited beef production as a primary driver of climate change, and advise that a global reduction in meat consumption should be pursued.

Cattle farming is one of the primary reasons for deforestation of the Amazon rainforest and in Indonesia, since habitat is lost when forest is converted to pasture or to arable land for fodder crops.

== Breeds ==
Major breeds of beef cattle include:

| Breed | Origin | Description |
|---|---|---|
| Adaptaur | Australia | A tropically adapted Bos taurus breed, developed from crosses between Herefords and Shorthorns. |
| Afrikaner cattle | South Africa | Afrikaners are usually deep red or black with long spreading horns. They have the small cervico-thoracic hump typical of Sanga cattle. |
| Aberdeen Angus | Scotland | Pure black, sometimes with white at udder. Polled. Hardy and thrifty. |
| Alentejana | Portugal | |
| Ankole | Uganda | |
| Australian Braford | Australia | Developed for resistance to ticks and for heat tolerance by crossing Brahmans and Herefords. |
| Australian Brangus | Australia | Polled breed developed by crossing Angus and Brahman |
| Australian Charbray | Australia | Developed by crossing Charolais and Brahman and selected for resistance to heat, humidity, parasites and diseases. |
| Bali | Indonesia | |
| Barzona | United States (Arizona) | Developed in the high desert, inter-mountain region of Arizona. |
| Beefalo | United States | Hybrid between a cow and an American bison. |
| Beef Shorthorn | England and Scotland | Suitable for both dairy and beef. |
| Beefmaster | United States (Texas) | Developed by breeding the Brahman, Shorthorn, and Hereford. |
| Belgian Blue | Belgium | Grey roan, or white with grey on head. Extremely muscular (double muscled). Fast-growing if well-fed. |
| Belmont Red | Australia | A composite breed using Africander (African Sanga) and Hereford-Shorthorn |
| Belted Galloway | Scotland | Black with white band around middle, stocky, fairly long hair, polled. Very hardy and thrifty. |
| Black Hereford | Great Britain | A crossbreed produced by crossing a Hereford bull with Holstein or Friesian cows; used to obtain beef offspring from dairy cows. Not maintained as a separate breed, although females may be used for further breeding with other beef bulls. |
| Blonde d'Aquitaine | France | Pale brown, paler round eyes and nose. Muscular. Fast-growing if well-fed. |
| Bonsmara | South Africa | Developed from 10/16 Afrikaner, 3/16 Hereford and 3/16 Shorthorn cattle. |
| Boran | East Africa (Ethiopia-Kenya) | Usually white, with the bulls being darker (sometimes almost black). |
| Brahman | India, Pakistan and United States | Large, pendulous ears and dewlaps, hump over the shoulders. |
| Brangus | United States | Developed by crossing Angus and Brahman. |
| British White | Great Britain | White body, with black (or sometimes red) ears, nose and feet; polled (hornless). Hardy and thrifty. |
| Caracu | Brazil | |
| Charolais | France | Wholly white or cream, lyre-shaped pale horns, or polled. Fast-growing if well-fed. |
| Chianina | Italy | Dual-purpose, originally large draft breed, later selected for beef. |
| Corriente | Mexico | Hardy, small, athletic, criollo-type, descended from Iberian cattle. Used in rodeo sports, noted for lean meat. Short horns, various colors, often spotted. Also called Criollo or Chinampo. |
| Crioulo Lageano | Iberian Peninsula | 400-year-old longhorn breed with around 700 individuals that live close to the plateau of Lages, Santa Catarina, Brazil. |
| Dairy Shorthorn | United Kingdom | Suitable for both dairy and beef. |
| Dexter | Ireland | Very small, black or dun, dark horns. Sometimes has a dwarfing gene, leading to very short legs. Hardy and thrifty. |
| Droughtmaster | Australia | Developed by crossing Brahman cattle with taurine breeds, especially the Beef Shorthorn. Tolerant of heat and ticks. |
| English Longhorn | England | Red or brindle, with white back and belly. Very long cylindrical horns usually spreading sideways or downwards, often curving and even eventually making a circle. Medium size, hardy. |
| Fleckvieh | Switzerland | Red pied or solid red, polled or horned. Sturdy dual-purpose for beef and dairy. Formerly triple-purpose (beef, dairy and draught). Fast-growing if well-fed. |
| Florida Cracker cattle | United States | Small, criollo-type descended from cattle brought to the Southern U.S. by the Spanish conquistadors. Adapted to subtropical climate, parasite-resistant. An endangered breed. |
| Galloway | Scotland | Black, stocky, fairly long hair, polled. Very hardy and thrifty. |
| Gascon cattle | France | Grey, hardy, maternal breed. Good growth and conformation of calves. Suitable for all farming systems, bred pure or crossed with a terminal sire. |
| Gelbvieh | Germany | Red, strong skin pigmentation, polled. Superior fertility, calving ease, mothering ability, and growth rate of calves. |
| Hanwoo | Korea | |
| Hérens | Switzerland | |
| Hereford | England | Red, white head, white finching on neck, and white switch. |
| Highland | Scotland | Small, stocky; black, red, dun or white. Very long coat and very long pale horns, upswept in cows and steers. Very hardy and thrifty. |
| Hungarian Grey | Hungary | Robust, easy-calving and long-lived. Horns long, curved and directed upward. Slender and tall. Well-adapted to extensive pasture systems. |
| Irish Moiled | Ireland | Red with white back and belly, or white with red ears, nose and feet. Polled. Hardy and thrifty. |
| Jabres | Central Java, Indonesia | Colors varied from light brown to dark brown with a black stripe spans from back to tail. |
| Japanese Shorthorn | Japan | A breed of small beef cattle. |
| Limousin | Limousin and Marche regions of France | Mid-brown, paler round eyes and nose. Fast-growing if well-fed. |
| Lincoln Red | England | |
| Lowline | Australia | Developed by selectively breeding small Angus cattle. |
| Luing | Luing and surrounding Inner Hebrides, Scotland | Rough coat, red-brown, polled. Bred by crossing Beef Shorthorn with Highland. Very hardy and thrifty. |
| Madura | East Java, Indonesia | Small body, short legs, reddish yellow hair. |
| Maine-Anjou | Anjou region in France | Red-and-white pied, polled, fast-growing if well-fed. |
| Mirandesa | Portugal | |
| Mocho Nacional | Brazil | Polled |
| Murray Grey | South Eastern Australia | Grey or silver polled cattle developed from a roan Shorthorn cow and an Angus bull. Easy-care versatile cattle that have been exported to many countries. |
| N'dama | West Africa | |
| Nelore | India | Exported to Brazil, where it has become a dominant breed. |
| Nguni | South Africa | Extremely hardy breed developed by the Nguni tribes for harsh African conditions. Originally derived from the African Sanga cattle, although quite distinct. Three subgroups are recognized: Makhatini, Swazi and Pedi. |
| North Devon | Devon, Cornwall and Somerset, England | Ruby-red, white tail switch, white horns. |
| Piedmontese | Piedmont, Italy | Bred both for beef and dairy production; double-muscled. White-coloured and possessing myostatin genes. |
| Pineywoods | Gulf Coast, US | Landrace heritage endangered breed, lean, small, adapted to climate of the Deep South, disease-resistant. Short horns, various colors, often spotted. |
| Pinzgauer | Austria | Indigenous to the Pinz Valley. Dairy cattle in Europe, but well-adapted to drier landscapes of the US, Australia and South Africa, where they are kept for beef production. Solid red with very distinctive white blaze from wither, down to tail tip and underside. |
| Red Angus | Australia, United States | Colour variety of Angus in some countries: solid red. Polled. |
| Red Poll | East Anglia in England | Red with white switch, polled (hornless), dual-purpose. |
| Red Sindhi | Sindh in Pakistan | Red Sindhi cattle are the most popular of all zebu dairy breeds. In Pakistan, they are kept for beef production or dairy farming. |
| Romagnola | Italy | Bred primarily for beef production; often used as draught beasts in the past. White or grey with black pigmented skin and upward curving horns. |
| Romosinuano | Colombia | |
| Rubia Gallega | Spain | A breed of cattle native to the autonomous community of Galicia in north-western Spain. It is raised mainly for meat. It is distributed throughout Galicia, with about 75% of the population concentrated in the province of Lugo. The coat may be red-blond, wheaten, or cinnamon-coloured. |
| Salers | France | Red. Hardy, easy calving. |
| Santa Gertrudis | Southern Texas, US | Developed by crossing red Shorthorn and Brahman. |
| Sibi bhagnari | Sibi Baluchistan | The breed typically has a white or grey coloured body and is black around the neck and has a black tail switch. The head is medium-sized with a short strong neck, small ears, short horns, small dewlap, straight back, wide chest and a moderate sized hump. Dual-purpose (beef & draught). |
| Simmental | Western Switzerland | Yellowish-brown, white head. Fast-growing if well-fed. Triple-purpose (beef, dairy and draught). |
| Shorthorn/Beef Shorthorn | Northern England | Red, red with white back and belly, or white. |
| Square Meater | New South Wales, Australia | Small, grey or silver, polled; similar to Murray Grey. |
| Stabiliser | America | Bred for efficiency, moderate-sized cow, red or black, polled, composite of native and continental breeds - originally Angus, Hereford, Simmental and Gelbvieh. |
| Sussex | South-east England | Rich chestnut red with white tail switch and white horns. Also used for draught until the early 20th century. Hardy and thrifty. |
| Tabapuan | Brazil | |
| Tajima | Japan | Black Wagyu bred for internationally renowned beef such as Kobe and Matsuzaka. |
| Texas Longhorn | United States | Various colours, with very long, tapering, upswept horns – extending as much as 80 inches (2.0 m) tip to tip. Very hardy in dry climates. Light-muscled, so bulls often used for first-calf heifers. |
| Wagyū | Japan | Black, horned, and noted for heavy marbling (intramuscular fat deposition). |
| Welsh Black | Wales | Black, white upswept horns with black tips. Hardy. |
| White Park | Great Britain, Ireland | White, with black (or sometimes red) ears, nose and feet; white horns with dark tips. Hardy and thrifty. |
| Żubroń | Poland | Hybrid between a cow and a European bison. |

== See also ==
- Conjugated linoleic acid
- List of cattle breeds
