= List of Brazilian cattle breeds =

This is a list of cattle breeds considered in Brazil to be wholly or partly of Brazilian origin. Some may have complex or obscure histories, so inclusion here does not necessarily imply that a breed is predominantly or exclusively Brazilian.

Name	Other names, if any	Notes	Image
Angola			
Brazilian Gir			
Brazilian Milking Crossbred	Mestiço Leitiero Brasileiro		
Canchim			
Cangaian			
Caracu			
Caracu Caldeano			
China			
Crioulo Lageano			
Crioulo do Sul	Brazilian Crioulo		
Curraleiro-Pé Duro			
Dairy Gir			
Franqueiro			
Girolando			
Guademar			
Guzerá			
Guzerá mocho			
Ibage			
Igarap			
Indu-Brasil			
Irece			
Javanês			
Junqueiro			
Lavinia			
Malabar			
Mantiqueira			
Mocho Nacional			
Nelore			
Nilo			
Pantaneiro	Cuiabano; Tucura		
Patuá			
Pedreiro			
Pitangueiras			
Quinhentão			
Santa Gabriela			
Tabapuan			
Tatu			
