= Criollo =

Criollo or criolla (Spanish for creole) may refer to:

== People ==
- Criollo people, a social class in the Spanish colonial system.

== Animals ==
- Criollo duck, a species of duck native to Central and South America.
- Criollo cattle, a group of cattle breeds descended from Spanish stock imported to the Americas
  - Argentine Criollo cattle, one of these breeds
  - Raramuri Criollo cattle, another such breed
- Criollo horse, a South American horse breed
- Criollo sheep, a breed of domestic sheep originating in the highlands of South and Central America
- Cuban Criollo horse, a horse breed from Cuba

== Food and plants ==
- Avocado criollo, the native undomesticated variety of avocado (Persea americana) as found in Mexico
- Criollo cheese, a Mexican grating cheese
- Criollo (cocoa bean), a cocoa bean cultivar from Chuao, Venezuela
- Criolla (grape), a group of grape varieties
- List of mango cultivars, or Mango criollo, a mango cultivar originating from Ecuador
- Pabellón criollo, a traditional Venezuelan dish
- Pique criollo, a hot condiment used in Puerto Rican cooking
- Criollo (chocolate), a rare and expensive variety of chocolate

== Music ==
- Criolla, a genre of Cuban music
- Música criolla, a genre of Peruvian music combining mainly African, Spanish and Andean influences
- Criollo (band), Canadian band
- Criolo (born 1975), Brazilian singer and rapper
- Los Troveros Criollos, música criolla band from Peru

== Other ==
- Criollo tobacco, a type of tobacco originated in Cuba and used for cigar wrappers
- Criollos de Caguas (disambiguation)
- El Fausto criollo, a 1979 Argentine film directed by Luis Saslavsky
- Monte Criollo, a 1935 Argentine musical film directed and written by Arturo S. Mom
- Criollismo, Latin American literary movement
- Fútbol criollo, a style of playing football associated with Argentina
- Viveza criolla, an aspect of Argentine mentality

== See also ==
- Creole (disambiguation)
