= Venezuelan Criollo =

Venezuelan breed of cattle

Venezuelan Criollo or Criollo Limonero, are a landrace breed of Bos taurus that have adapted over the past 400 years to the tropical dry forests of Zulia, Venezuela (and which gain their name from the Limón River, there, and also likely due to their limón color). Criollo Limonero, like other Criollo cattle bio-types, have descended from Andalusian breeds of cattle brought to the Americas by early explorers to the New World. Criollo Limonero are prized for having good milk yields, high fertility, and a docile temperament. Criollo Limonero are considered national patrimony to Venezuela; some studies show a high genetic diversity among the breed which researchers view as a resource for conserving the sustainable, locally adapted dairy breed.

Venezuelan Criollo Limonero have been selected since the late 1950s by private farmers seeking increased milk production, hence, they are larger than their desert counterparts (e.g. Raramuri or Corriente) and smaller than their sub-tropical counterparts (e.g. Romosinuano), and resemble modern dual purpose breeds (e.g. milking Devon) in their conformation suchlike possessing a sound udder, strong legs, wide hips, a feminine head (dolichocephalic), and more color uniformity (than other Criollo types). Colors can range, however, from bay to yellow or redish, often with black smudge spots complementing their eyes. Mature cows average 404 kg (890 lbs). Efforts are being made to maintain pure Criollo Limonero genetics from becoming adulterated by mainstream dairy breeds; genetic tests have shown the breed possesses the CSN3 gene, suggesting that these cattle may be well equipped for high milk and cheese production given a genetic breeding improvement plan. Another reason Criollo Limonero seem well-adapted to the harsh tropical forests of Venezuela is due to their hair and blood flow morpho-physiology; the slick-hair gene has been favored in this breed, likely due to natural selection, and these animals possess a "high blood flow" leading to skin irrigation (e.g. fast heat dissipation) despite having few sebaceous glands like in the bos indicus subspecies. Like the zebu sub-species, Criollo Limonero have a black hide, and loose skin, which may also play a role in thermo-tolerance.
