= List of Mexican cattle breeds =

This is a list of the cattle breeds usually considered to have originated in Mexico. Some may have complex or obscure histories, so inclusion here does not necessarily imply that a breed is predominantly or exclusively Mexican.

Local name	English name, if any	Notes	Image
Chinampo^{[1]}^{[2]}^{[3]}			
Criollo Lechero Tropical^{[1]}	Tropical Dairy Criollo; Milking Criollo^{[2]}		
Criollo de la Sierra Madre Occidental^{[1]}^{[2]}^{[3]}			
Criollo de las Montañas del Norte^{[1]}^{[2]}^{[3]}			
Criollo del Golfo^{[1]}^{[2]}^{[3]}			
Criollo del Desierto de Baja California^{[1]}^{[2]}^{[3]}			
Criollo Mexicano^{[1]}^{[2]}^{[3]}			
Cuernos Largos^{[1]}^{[3]}			
Frijolillo^{[1]}^{[2]}^{[3]}			
Troleche^{[1]}^{[2]}^{[3]}			
Tropicarne^{[1]}^{[2]}^{[3]}			
