= Waguli =

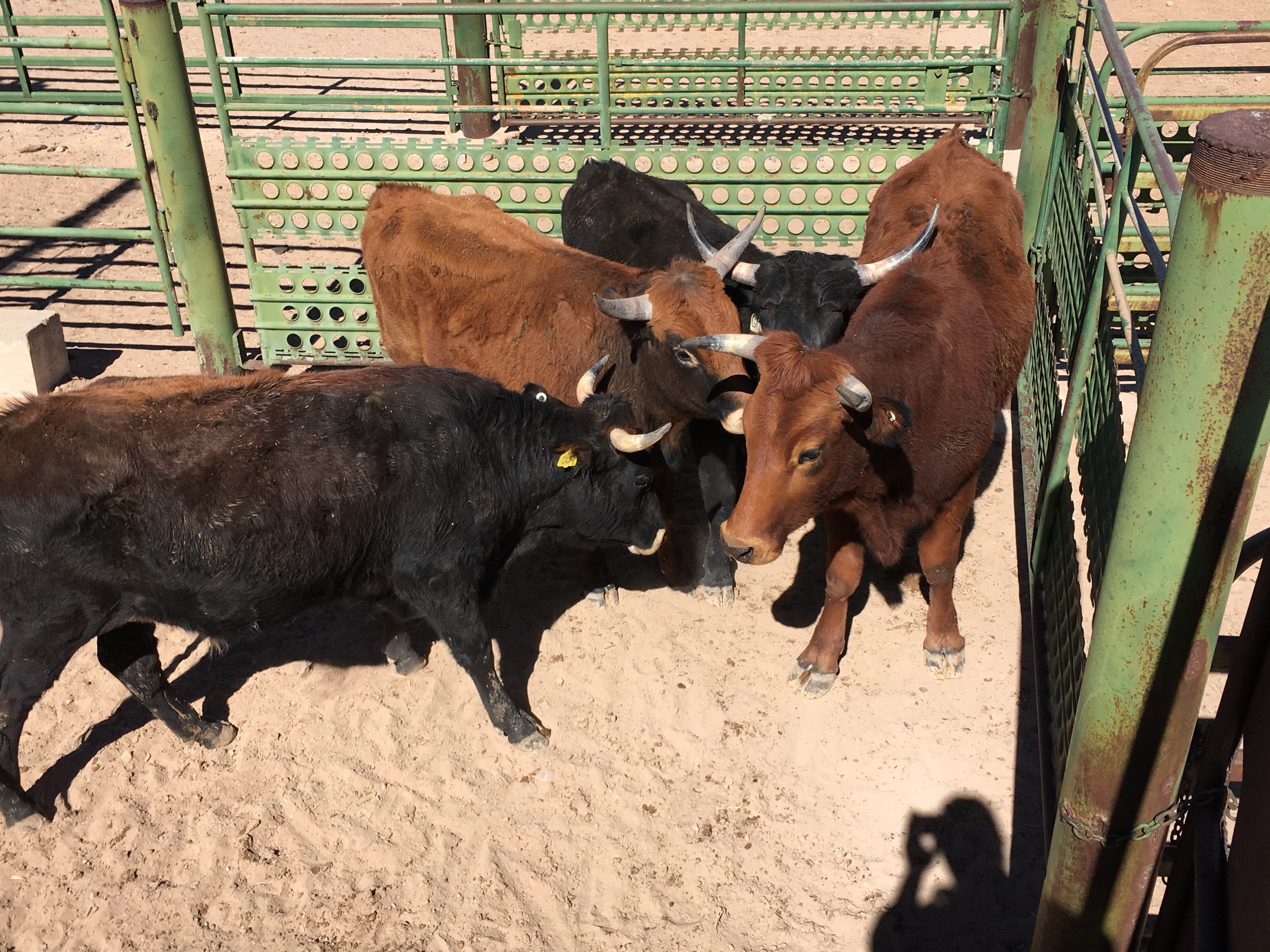
Red steers are Waguli X Raramuri Criollo crossbreds at the Jornada Experimental Range, NM.

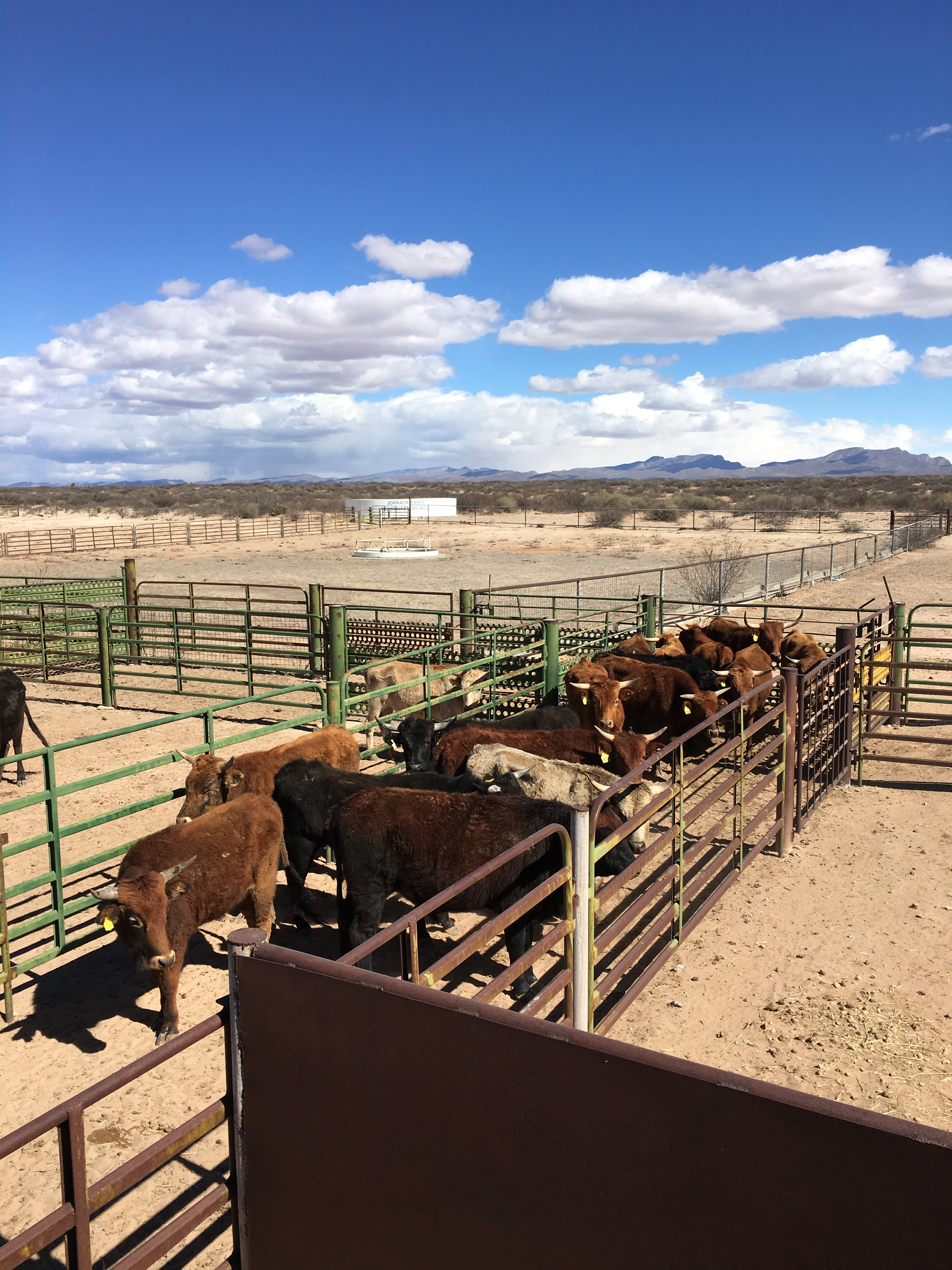
Red Steers are Waguli X Raramuri Criollo crossbreds at the Jornada Experimental Range, NM.

Waguli cattle are a breed of cattle used in beef production. The Waguli were developed at the University of Arizona at the V-V Ranch outside Campe Verde, AZ. The breed is a resulting cross of the Tuli (a Zimbabwean Sanga breed) and the Wagyu (a Japanese taurus breed).

Like the development of the Santa Gertrudis and the Brangus, the Waguli was developed in an attempt to obtain a heat-tolerant and high quality meat breed. Because the Brahman breed typically yields low quality carcass characteristics, but shows extreme heat tolerance, beef producers have created hybrid crosses such as the Santa Gertrudis (Brahman X Shorthorn) and the Brangus (Brahman X Angus), which are British-Brahman crossed cattle with the hopes of attaining a high quality meat animal with extreme heat tolerance. The Waguli have shown superior meat tenderness in studies conducted at the University of Arizona when compared to purebred Brahman steers. Because the Sanga cattle breeds have been developed over thousands of years from Bos indicus and Bos taurus in the Sub-Saharan regions of Africa, the Tuli are known to be well suited to arid environments. Wagyu cattle are known for their superior marbling traits as they are genetically predisposed to intense marbling. Other hopes for this composite breed are that it will mature at a more rapid rate than its Brangus counterparts, which are known to be slower maturing when compared to traditional European cattle breeds as well as having very poor marbling characteristics in comparison.
