= Cagua (disambiguation) =

Cagua is a city of Venezuela, capital of the Sucre Municipality of Aragua State. Cagua is part of the metropolitan area of Maracay

It may also refer to:

- Cagua language, one of the Spurious languages See list
- Cagua Volcano, a stratovolcano located in the Philippine province of Cagayan
- Jhon Cagua, Ecuadorean footballer

== See also ==
- Caguas (disambiguation)
