= Pantaneiro =

Brazilian breed of cattle

- Conservation status: FAO (2007): endangered
- Other names: Crioulo pantaneiro; Cuiabano; Tucara; Tucura
- Country of origin: Brazil
- Distribution: Pantanal region

Traits
- Weight: Male: 375 kg; Female: 290 kg
- Height: Male: 126 cm; Female: 119 cm
- Cattle; Hybrid Bos (primigenius) taurus/indicus

The Pantaneiro is a Brazilian breed of Criollo cattle from the Pantanal wetland region of Brazil, where it has been raised for more than four hundred years. In the twenty-first century it is considered to be at risk of extinction.

== History ==
The Pantaneiro derives from Spanish cattle brought to the Americas by the conquistadores at the time of the colonisation of the Río de la Plata basin. Cattle were first brought to the Mato Grosso in the 1540s; in 1568 a herd of more than seven hundred head was carried off by local indigenous people and taken to the extensive wetlands of the Pantanal, where they raised them for some two hundred years. From the eighteenth century, when agreement was reached with the colonists, the stock was influenced by breeds of Portuguese origin such as the Curraleiro and Franqueiro. DNA studies have shown that there has been contamination of the breed through the use of bulls of zebuine breeds such as the Nelore, introduced to the Pantanal region during the twentieth century; approximately one quarter of the genome is of Nelore origin, while the mitochondrial DNA was found to be entirely taurine.

The Pantaneiro was the principal breed of the Pantanal for several centuries. It is now considered to be at risk of extinction. In 2003 a population of less than 1000 was reported.

== Characteristics ==
The Pantaneiro is a small breed; the coat is short, and brown or reddish-brown in colour, with a tendency to lighten on the back. It is well adapted to the extreme climatic conditions of the Pantanal region, which is characterised by high temperatures and periods both of flooding and high humidity, and of drought. The cattle are rustic and hardy, capable of surviving periods of food scarcity, and resistant to some diseases.
