= Santa Gertrudis cattle =

American breed of cattle

Santa Gertrudis
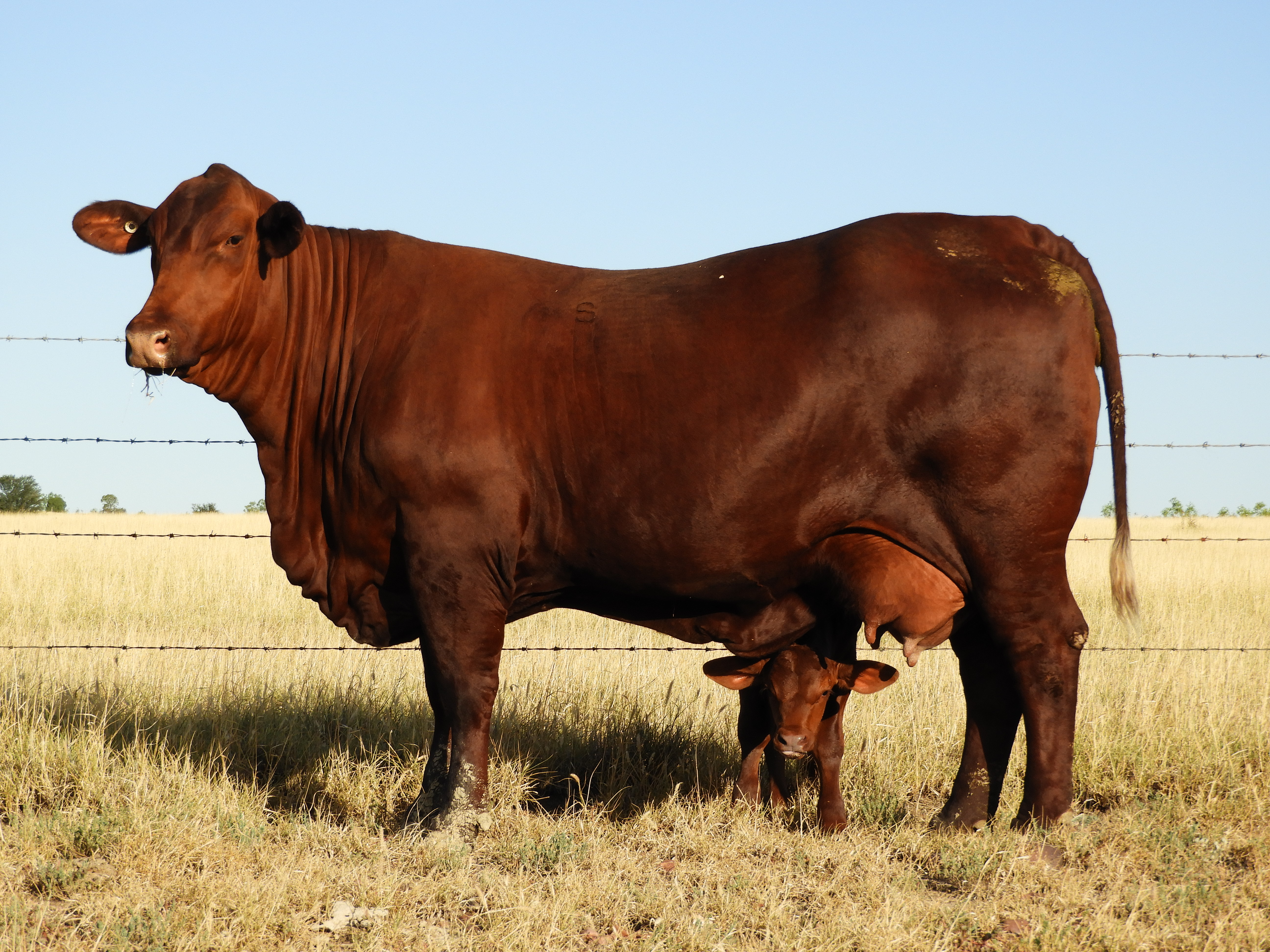
- Conservation status: worldwide: not at risk; United States: at risk/vulnerable
- Country of origin: United States
- Distribution: international
- Use: beef

Traits
- Weight: Male: 750–1000 kg; Female: 600–850 kg
- Coat: cherry-red
- Horn status: horned or polled
- Cattle; Hybrid Bos (primigenius) taurus/indicus

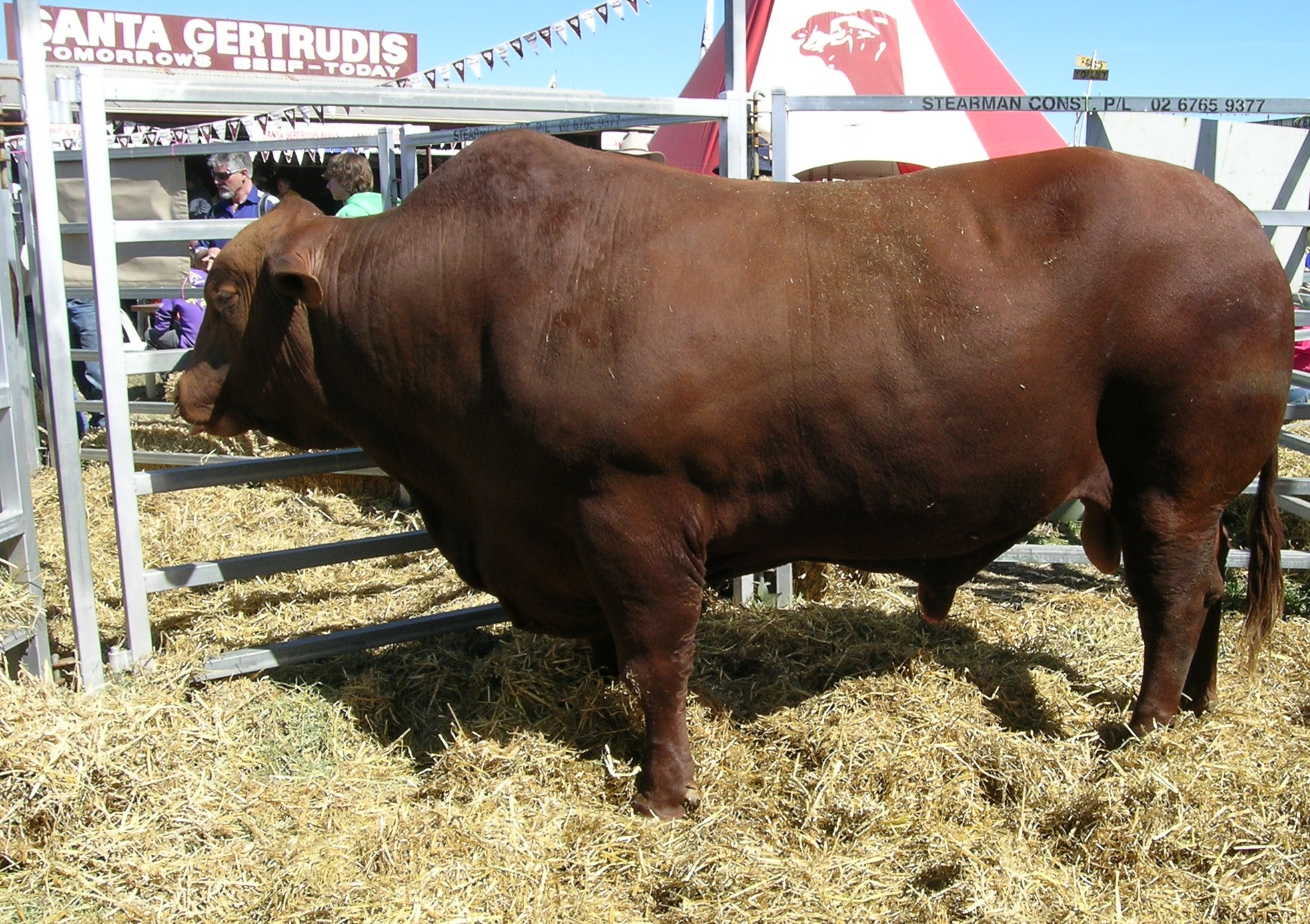
Bull at Gunnedah, New South Wales, Australia

The Santa Gertrudis is an American breed of beef cattle. It is a taurine-indicine hybrid breed, descended from both zebu and European cattle. It was bred in the early twentieth century in Texas, and received official recognition in 1940. It has been exported to many countries including Australia, Brazil and South Africa, and has contributed to the development of a number of modern breeds, among them the Barzona and the Droughtmaster.

== History ==
The Santa Gertrudis was developed on the King Ranch in southern Texas. The name derives from that of the Spanish-owned estate of Los Cerros de Santa Gertrudis, where in 1851 the King Ranch was established.

The ranch was initially stocked with Texas Longhorn cattle. From about 1880 bulls of the British Hereford and Beef Shorthorn breeds were used to improve them; substantial separate Shorthorn and Hereford herds were kept to supply the bulls. In 1910 a part-zebuine bull, descended from an Ongole bull imported in 1906 directly from India, was acquired and was cross-bred with cows of the Shorthorn stock. The results were promising, and in 1918 the ranch bought fifty-two taurindicine bulls with no less than 75% zebuine parentage, in the hope of creating a composite breed of about 37% zebuine and 62% taurine ancestry. Between 1923 and 1935 a bull named Monkey was extensively used to fix the characteristics of the breed, which was officially recognized by the United States Department of Agriculture in 1940. All Santa Gertrudis stock descends from this bull.

In 1931 the ranch imported from South Africa eleven cows and sixteen bulls of Afrikander stock, with the idea of using them to help fix the deep red coat color of the new breed. In the event, this was not found to be necessary, and the cattle were sold off; some were used to create the Africangus cross-breed, and others contributed to the development of the Barzona.

A breed association was formed in 1951, and the first bulls were sold in the same year.

The Santa Gertrudis has been exported to many countries, and is reported to DAD-IS by about forty, in all five inhabited continents. In 2021 the total number worldwide was estimated at approximately 72 000. The largest population was reported from South Africa, at approximately 25 000; significant numbers were reported from Australia, Brazil, Morocco, Namibia, Paraguay and South Africa.

In the United States there were 28 000 head in 1975; by 1990 this had fallen to about 15 200, and to just under 8500 in 2000–2001. In 2013 the population was reported at 5000, and in 2021 the local conservation status was "at risk".

== Characteristics ==
The cattle are a solid deep cherry-red in color, with only minimal traces of white on the underline; they may be either polled or horned. They are hardy, with good resistance to ticks and bloat, and good tolerance of heat. Signs of their indicine heritage include a small hump in bulls, medium-large ears, and loose skin with heavy folds below the neck. The coat is smooth and short.

== Use ==
The Santa Gertrudis is reared for beef. It was bred to be better adapted than imported British beef breeds to the environmental conditions of Texas – the semi-arid landscape, the sub-tropical climate and the abundance of ticks – and has been exported to a number of other countries where conditions are similar, including Australia, Brazil and South Africa.

It has contributed to the development of a number of modern composite breeds, among them the Barzona (with Aberdeen Angus, Afrikander and Hereford in roughly equal proportions); the Brazos (with Hereford and Gelbvieh); the Droughtmaster (with Beef Shorthorn, Devon, Hereford, Red Brahman, Red Poll, and possibly Afrikander); and the Santa Cruz (with Gelbvieh and Red Angus).
