= Criollos de Caguas =

Criollos de Caguas, Spanish for "Caguas Creoles", may refer to several professional sport teams of Caguas, Puerto Rico:

- Criollos de Caguas (baseball), men's
- Criollos de Caguas (basketball), men's
- Criollos de Caguas FC, men's football

== See also ==
- Criollas de Caguas, women's volleyball
- Caguas (disambiguation)
- Criollos (disambiguation)
