= Caguas (disambiguation) =

Caguas, Puerto Rico, a city and municipality of Puerto Rico located in the Central Mountain Range of Puerto Rico

It may also refer to:

- Caguas barrio-pueblo, barrio and the administrative center (seat) of Caguas, a municipality of Puerto Rico

== See also ==
- Cagua (disambiguation)
- Criollos de Caguas (disambiguation), several sports teams
