= Criollo cattle =

Type of cattle

Criollo, Crioulo or Créole cattle are those cattle in the Americas which descend from Iberian stock brought to the region by the conquistadores in the fifteenth and sixteenth centuries.

== List of breeds ==
Breeds include:

- In the Caribbean:
  - Creole Guadeloupe
  - Créole Martinique
  - Cuban Criollo
  - Puerto Rican Criollo
- In South America:
  - Argentine Criollo
  - Bolivian Criollo
  - Colombian Criollo
  - Crioulo (Chimarrão) types:
    - Brazilian Polled
    - Caracu
    - Curraleio
    - Crioulo Lageano or Crioulo de Santa Catarina or Franqueiro
    - Pantaneiro
    - Polled Crioulo Pereira Camargo
  - Ecuador Criollo
  - Romosinuano
  - Uruguayan Criollo
  - Venezuelan Criollo
- In Central America:
  - Barroso
  - Criollo de Baja California or Chinampo
  - Criollo de Chiapas
  - Criollo de Chihuahua
  - Criollo de Nayarit
  - Criollo Poblano
  - Tropical Dairy Criollo or Criollo Lechero Tropical
- In North America:
  - Corriente
  - Florida Cracker
  - Frijolillo
  - Pineywoods
  - Raramuri Criollo
  - Texas Longhorn
