= Beefmaster =

Breed of beef cattle

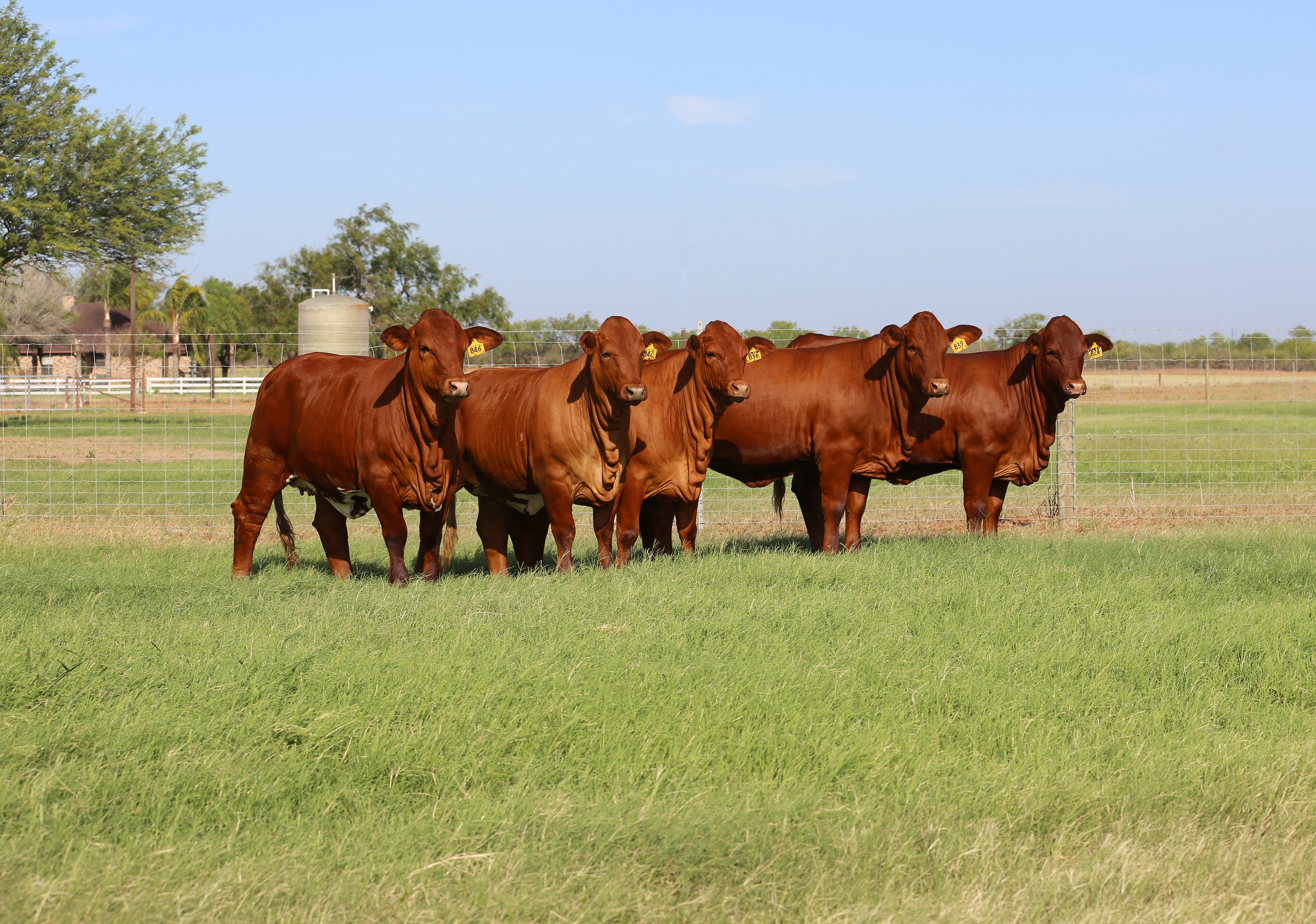
Beefmaster heifers

Beefmaster is a breed of beef cattle that was developed in the early 1930s by Tom Lasater (the breed founder), from a systematic crossing of Hereford cows and Shorthorn cows with Brahman bulls. The exact mixture of the foundation cattle is unknown, but is thought to be about 25% Hereford, 25% Milking Shorthorn and 50% Brahman. It was first recognized by the USDA as a new breed in 1954. The original intention was to produce cattle that could produce economically in the difficult environment of South Texas. The cattle were selected by using the Six Essentials – weight, conformation, milking ability, fertility, hardiness and disposition. While brownish-red is the most common color, the breed has no color standards. Over the past decade, the Beefmaster breed has become very popular among herd managers using the breed in their heterosis programs for hybrid vigor. These cattle are a versatile breed and adapt to many climates.
