= Barzona =

Cattle breed

The Barzona are a breed of beef cattle, developed in the United States, in the high desert, inter-mountain region of Arizona in the 1940s and 1950s. They are, in approximately equal proportions, a combination of Africander, Hereford, Beef Shorthorn and Angus. They have been bred to be especially hardy, having good heat, insect and disease tolerance.
