= Criollo Mexicano =

Mexican breed of cattle

- Conservation status: FAO (2007): no data; DAD-IS (2022): unknown
- Country of origin: Mexico

The Criollo Mexicano is a Mexican breed or group of breeds of Criollo cattle — that is, cattle that derive principally from the Iberian cattle brought to the Americas by the Conquistadores, starting with the Second Voyage of Christopher Columbus in 1493.

== History ==
Iberian cattle were introduced to the Americas by the Conquistadores, and arrived in various parts of what is now Mexico during the sixteenth and seventeenth centuries. Cattle were first brought into Mexico from the Caribbean islands in 1521 and gradually spread throughout the territory of the country. They were in the area of Mexico City by about 1535, and by 1565 had spread as far as the Pacific coast of Nayarit. Within about a century, they had reached the deserts of Chihuahua and Sonora, including Baja California.

A breed society, the Asociación de Criadores de Ganado Criollo Mexicano, was established in 1995.
