= Adaptaur =

Breed of cattle

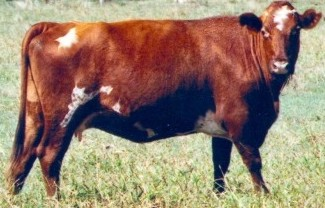
An Adaptaur cow

The Adaptaur is a tropically-adapted Bos taurus beef cattle breed which was developed in Australia in the 1950s from crosses between Herefords and Shorthorns.

== History ==
The breed was established on the Belmont Research Station near Rockhampton, Queensland and cattle were selected primarily for increased resistance and/or tolerance to tropical heat and cattle ticks (Boophilus microplus).

== Characteristics ==
Adaptaur cattle are early maturing and of a medium size with a short dark red pigmented coat and good resistance to internal parasites. Some Adaptaurs carry a gene that produces extremely high resistance to cattle ticks and the Australian Hereford Society is assisting to increase frequency of the gene by embryo transfer.

It is capable of producing substantial hybrid vigor when used for crossbreeding. The F1 progeny grow faster and are more fertile than Brahmans. Adaptaurs have similar resistance to ticks and worms as Brahmans. They are at least 10% more efficient than Brahmans and have the favorable carcass qualities of the Bos taurus cattle.

Adaptaur cattle are mainly found in the tropical areas of northern Australia.
