= Pedreiro =

Pedreiro can refer to:

- Portuguese and Galician for two different careers:

- Stone mason, a worker who lays stone
- Bricklayer, a worker who lays brick

- Luva de Pedreiro, Brazilian YouTuber
- Shaughnessy v. Pedreiro, 1955 US Supreme Court decision
