= Jhon Cagua =

Ecuadorian footballer (born 1975)

Personal information
- Full name: Jhon Patricio Cagua
- Date of birth: September 25, 1975 (age 51)
- Place of birth: Esmeraldas, Ecuador
- Height: 1.77 m (5 ft 9 1/2 in)
- Position: Defender

Team information
- Current team: FC Haka
- Number: 26

Senior career*
Years	Team	Apps	(Gls)
1997	ESPOLI	17	(1)
1998	Emelec	3	(0)
1999	Deportivo Quito	28	(2)
2000	Barcelona	18	(0)
2001	Emelec	32	(1)
2002	ESPOLI	2	(0)
2003–2004	Deportivo Cuenca	41	(1)
2005	Emelec	16	(1)
2005	Santa Rita Vinces	14	(0)
2006–2007	Deportivo Quito	65	(2)
2008	El Nacional	14	(0)
2009–	FC Haka	5	(0)

International career
1999–2000	Ecuador	10	(0)
- * Club domestic league appearances and goals as of 8 October 2009

Jhon Cagua is an Ecuadorean defender who currently plays for FC Haka. Nicknamed "El Comunitario John" or "El Viejo John", Cagua had one of the most powerful strikes in the history of football. His typical played nicknamed "El Ollaso" consisted of kicking the ball from his own field to the rivals area, regardless of his position in the field.

== Clubs ==
Club	País	Año
Club Deportivo ESPOLI	Ecuador	1997_eats-pens
Emelec	Ecuador	1998
Sociedad Deportivo Quito	Ecuador	1999
Barcelona Sporting Club	Ecuador	2000
Emelec	Ecuador	2001
Club Deportivo ESPOLI	Ecuador	2002
Club Deportivo Cuenca	Ecuador	2003–2004
Emelec	Ecuador	2005
Santa Rita de Vinces	Ecuador	2005
Club Deportivo El Nacional	Ecuador	2006–2007-20033
Sociedad Deportivo Quito	cat-car	2008
Club Deportivo El Nacional	Ecuador	2009
FC Haka	Finland	2009
