= Crioulo Lageano =

Breed of cattle

Crioulo Lageano longhorn beef cattle (or "raça Crioula Lageana") originated from cattle originally brought to Brazil from Portugal by the Jesuits (Jesuit Reductions) 400 years ago. The breed was probably domesticated 4000 BC in Egypt, it came to the south of Spain from the North of Africa. The center of the rest population (just 700 individuals) is the plateau of Lages, Santa Catarina, Brazil.

It is similar to the Franqueira breed (just 500 individuals, eight to ten farmers in Rio Grande do Sul), with the same origin, which coming from Franca, São Paulo, spread through the Brazilian territory.

== Naturalized Brazilian cattle breeds ==
Most of the naturalized Brazilian cattle breeds came from three centers; São Vicente, Salvador and Recife and they were originally Portuguese breeds: the Alentejana or Transtagana, the Barrosã, the Mirandesa, the Minhota and the Arouquesa.

Naturalized Brazilian cattle breeds	Est. population size	Original location
Crioulo Lageano	100–1,000	Santa Catarina
Franqueiro	500	Rio Grande do Sul
Curraleiro	500–1,000	Piauí
Mocho Nacional (National Polled)	400	São Paulo and Goiás
Pantaneiro	8,300	Mato Grosso do Sul
Caracu	30,000	São Paulo
Junqueira (a Caracu longhorn breed)	-	Minas Gerais

== See also ==
- Bos aegyptiacus
