= Argentine Criollo cattle =

Breed of cattle

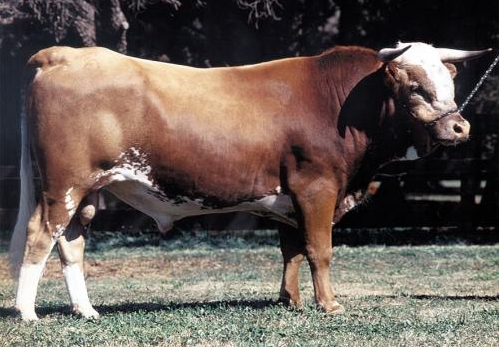
Argentine Criollo Bull from the "Asociación Argentina de Criadores de Ganado Bovino Criollo" webpage: www.viarural.com.ar/viarural.com.ar/ganaderia/asociaciones/bovinoscriollos/default.htm

The Argentine Criollo is one of the Criollo type cattle found in the Americas. Criollo cattle are descended from the first bovines brought by Christopher Columbus in his travels to America. These cattle are known for their docility and workability in addition to tremendous genetic variability. Like their Criollo relatives, the Argentine Criollo exhibits the full range of Bos taurus color patterns. These animals are highly adapted to their environment due to feral - naturally selective breeding regimes over the past 500 years, therefore they are extremely desirable for crossbreeding with traditional European breeds to assure incredible hybrid vigor. The Asociación Argentina de Criadores de Ganado Bovino Criollo was established in 1990 as the official breed society. Owners who wish to register their livestock with the Criollo Association must have their cattle tested and examined for pureness of origin, before they can be considered purebred Argentine Criollo cattle.
