= Cuban Criollo horse =

Group of horse breeds from Cuba

Cuban Criollo
- Country of origin: Cuba

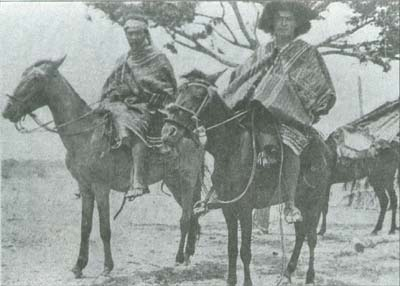
Wayuu riding on horses, 1928

The Criollo Cubano originates from Spanish horses brought to Cuba by Diego Velázquez in 1511. There are four different breeds known as criollo: the Cubano de Paso, the Pinto Cubano, the Criollo de Trote and the Patibarcino. It is a small stout breed used by the Guajiro people.

== Patibarcino ==
The Patibarcino was first bred by the families Reyes and Iznaga on their finca. The breed originated from a stallion called Lobo, which had a dark line on the back and zebra stripes on the legs and transmitted those characteristics to his descendants. This animals are dun or brown colored with a black dorsal stripe and stripes on their legs. They are between 1.48 and 1.52 m high. The Patibarcino’s head has a straight or slightly convex profile and big ears. Its thorax is wide and its croup oblique. It is a quite nervous and resistant horse used to corral cattle. Known specimens are Lobo, Lobito, Olivito and Fogoso.

== Cubano de Paso ==
The Cubano de Paso horse originated from Spanish horses. Its most known characteristic is the elegant and comfortable pace. It is a strong but elegant horse used for transportation in Cuba. The head is proporcional to its body with a straight profile which at times can be slightly convex or concave. The forehead is wide, the ears medium-sized and mobile. This breed has a strong neck and high, oblique muscular croup and a straight and strong back. The tendons and joints are well defined. The legs are strong and structured. Its average height lies between 1.45 and 1.50 m. The most frequent color is brown although every color is allowed. The Cubano de Paso’s temperament is docile and active. This breed is mostly used for transportation since they can cover large distances in a short time with its really easygoing pace. Most Cubano de Paso are bred in the ranch La Loma in the Cuban province, Granma. This breed is in need of new blood and is therefore refined with Spanish horses or Continental Criollos and other Pasos, brought from America, since they present similar characteristics. The American author Samuel Hazard was fascinated by this breed; as he wrote in 1870, during a visit in Cuba in his book Cuba a pluma y lapiz.

The Cuban horse is a magnificent animal, with a short, solid and well-formed body, strong legs and beautiful and intelligent eyes. For long days there is no better horse. These horses have corpulent necks, strong mains and thick tails and seeing them in the savannas where they are bred, before they get trained, shows a beautiful picture of wild horses. Their pace is a bit peculiar, exclusive to them and on a well-trained Cuban horse even someone who never has ridden can do it without worries.

== Pinto Cubano ==
The Pinto Cubano originated from Spanish horses. After the triumph of the revolution in 1959 a herd of pinto mares was gathered in the area of Manicaragua, in the Cuban province of Santa Clara, for their genetic improvement. Afterwards on the ranch La Guabina, located in the province Pinar del Rio, their muscular development was improved interbreeding them with quarter horses and a British pinto called Bony. This breed is found in two colors: tobiano and overo. Their average height lies between 1.44 and 1.52 m, the head is proportional to the body with a straight or slightly convex profile and medium-sized or small ears. The neck is quite long and well attached with an abundant mane. The croup is oblique and should be as high as the withers. Overall it is a compact, medium-sized, squared horse with well-defined musculature and a healthy and strong constitution. Its skeleton is strong with well-developed tendons and joints.

== Cubano de Trote ==
The Cubano de Trote originated from Spanish horses like the Andalusian horse and the Cartujano horse. It is a really strong and resistant breed used for work. Its average height lies between 1.48 and 1.50 m. The Cubano de Trotes’s head has a straight or slightly convex profile. The neck is thick and strong and the thorax wide, the withers are quite high and the croup tends to be oblique. Its color varies but the predominant one is gold. The most known stallions are 16 Doradito, 5 Tuerto, 49, 51, Proyectil and Erizo.
