= Caracu =

Brazilian breed of cattle

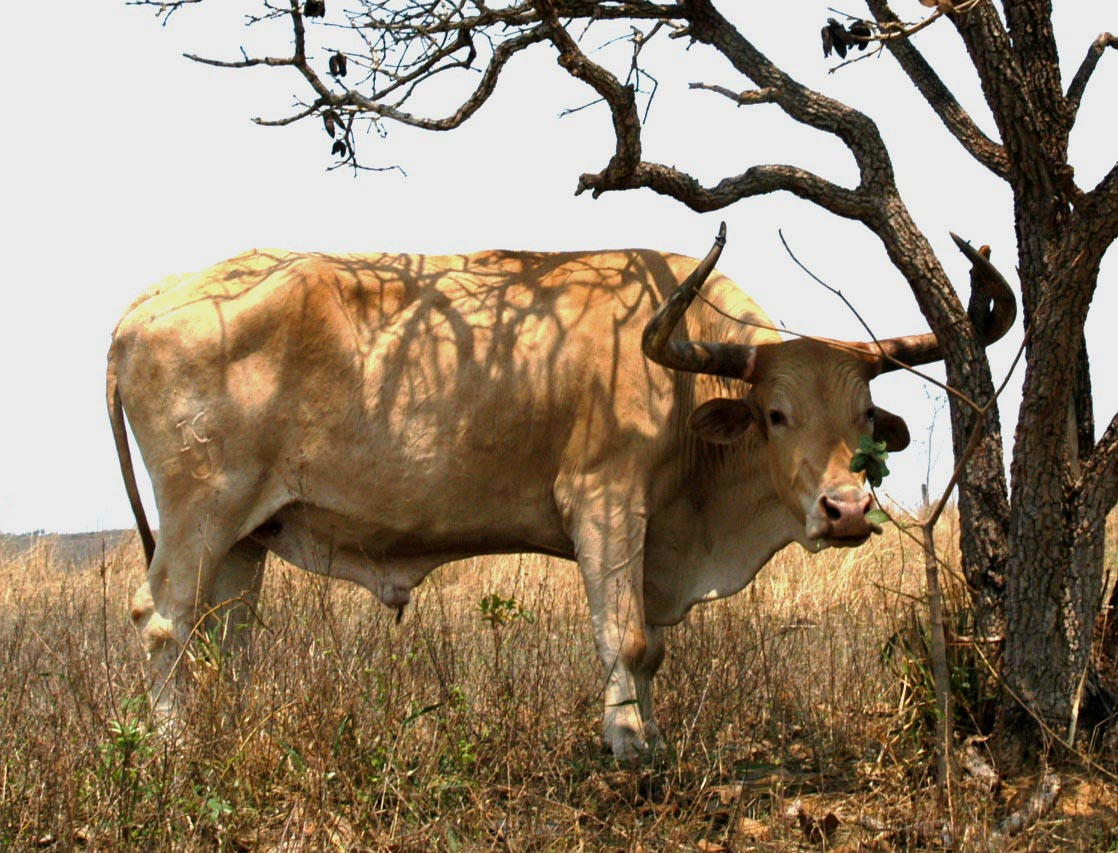

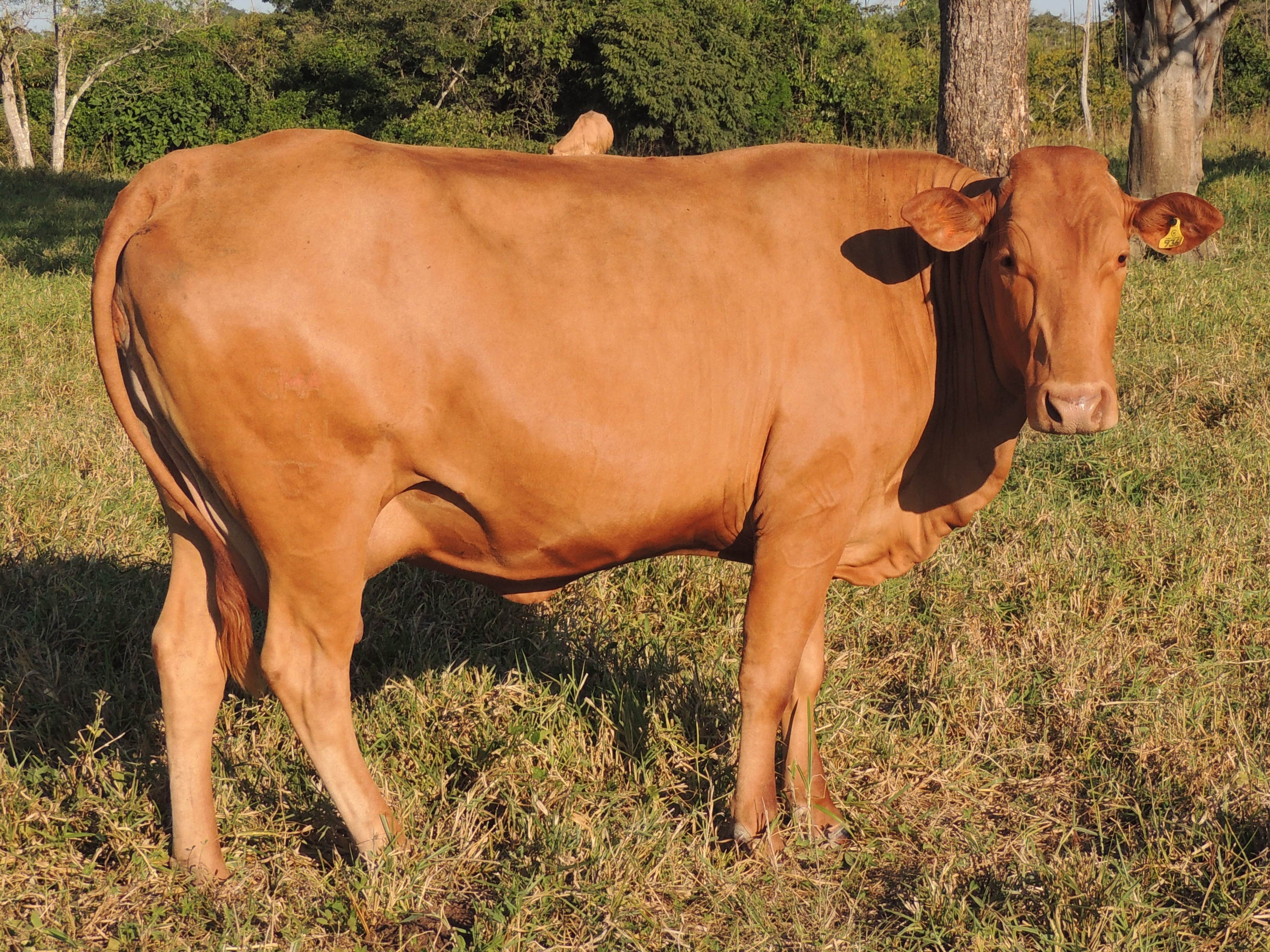
- Conservation status: FAO (2007): not at risk; DAD-IS (2022): not at risk
- Other names: Caracú
- Country of origin: Brazil
- Use: formerly beef

Traits
- Weight: Male: 950–1200 kg; Female: 550–650 kg
- Height: Male: average 143 cm; Female: average 135 cm
- Coat: uniform red in any shade
- Horn status: horned, sometimes polled
- Cattle; Bos (primigenius) taurus

The Caracu is a Brazilian breed of beef cattle. It is a Criollo breed, derived from European cattle brought to Brazil by the conquistadors; it has little or no zebuine influence. It was originally a triple-purpose breed, used for draught work and transport, for meat and for milk; in the twenty-first century it is reared principally for beef, but there are also dairy lines. Population numbers fell sharply during much of the twentieth century but recovered rapidly from about 1980 onwards.

== History ==
The Caracu derives from cattle brought from Portugal to Brazil by the conquistadors from 1532 onwards. It is not known of what type these were, but they may have been similar to the modern Alentejana, Arouquesa, Barrosã, Minhota or Mirandesa breeds.

The Caracu originated in the southern part of Minas Gerais, and later spread into the state of São Paulo. An early description is that of Nicolas Athanassof in 1911. A breed association, the Associação Brasileira de Criadores de Caracu, was formed in 1916.

In 1913 an influential book by Eduardo Cotrim on cattle-rearing in Brazil, with many colour illustrations, was published in Brussels. It was highly critical of both Brazilian methods and Brazilian cattle, and may have initiated a decline in numbers of the Caracu, which fell steeply during much of the twentieth century as a result of cross-breeding with zebuine or other taurine breeds, coming close to the point of extinction.

In 1976 the Instituto de Zootecnia of Sertãozinho, in the state of São Paulo, added the Caracu to its research programme; in 1980 the breed association, which had been dormant since 1960, became active again. Numbers increased rapidly: from 12000 in 1979, the population rose to about 31000 head in 1994, and to over 85000 in 2010. In 2020 the total number reported was just over 162000.

== Characteristics ==
The Caracu is of medium size: average heights at the withers are 135 cm for cows and 143 cm for bulls; body weights are variously reported to range from 550 to 650 kg for cows and 950 to 1200 kg for bulls, or from 450 to 650 kg and 800 to 1000 kg respectively.

The coat is smooth, short and solid-coloured. Tt may be any shade of red, including reddish yellow, orange-yellow or bay, somewhat paler on the belly and round the eyes and muzzle; the mucosae are unpigmented.

== Use ==
It was originally a triple-purpose breed, used for draught work and transport, for meat and for milk. In the twenty-first century it is reared principally for beef, but there are also dairy lines; these include the Caracu Caldeano or Caldeano, for which a separate herd-book was established in 1960. The Caracu has contributed to the development of a number of other breeds, among them the now-extinct Patuá and Puganu cross-breeds with zebuine stock and the Tropicana and Aquitanica cross-breeds with Blonde d'Aquitaine; the Mantiqueira is a hybrid of the Caracu Caldeano and Holstein dairy stock. The Caracu is closely similar to the Mocho Nacional, a polled breed, and it is probable that the two will be merged.
