= Pineywoods cattle =

American breed of cattle

Pineywoods
- Conservation status: FAO (2007): not listed; Livestock Conservancy (2023): threatened; DAD-IS (2024): unknown
- Country of origin: United States
- Distribution: Alabama; Georgia; Mississippi
- Use: triple-purpose: meat, milk and draft

Traits
- Weight: Male: 350–550 kg; Female: 275–350 kg
- Coat: very variable, many colours and patterns
- Horn status: usually horned
- Cattle; Bos (primigenius) taurus

The Pineywoods is an endangered American breed of triple-purpose cattle. It derives from cattle of Iberian origin brought to Americas by the conquistadores in the late fifteenth and early sixteenth centuries. It is one of three such criollo breeds and is found mainly in Alabama, Georgia and Mississippi, between the ranges of the other two breeds, the Florida Cracker to the east and the Texas Longhorn to the west.

In the twenty-first century it is an endangered breed; in 2023 its conservation status was listed by the Livestock Conservancy as 'threatened', the second level of concern of the association..

== History ==
The Pineywoods, like other Criollo cattle, derives from cattle brought to the New World by Spanish conquistadores from the time of the Second Voyage of Christopher Columbus until about 1512. These cattle numbered no more than 300 head in all, and were brought to La Isla Española (now known as Hispaniola) and other Caribbean islands. The first of them were landed in 1493 on Hispaniola to provide food for the colonists.

Cattle from Cuba were landed in Spanish Florida in 1565, and there was another shipment from the same source in 1640. By the beginning of the eighteenth century the total number of cattle in the Spanish part of what is now the United States – Florida and parts of modern Alabama, Georgia and Mississippi – was estimated at between 15000 and 20000 head. These were triple-purpose cattle, reared for meat, for milk and for draft work. They were managed extensively, living in semi-feral conditions for much of the time.

A breed association, the Pineywoods Cattle Registry and Breeders Association, was established in 1999.

In the twenty-first century the Pineywoods is an endangered breed; in 2023 its conservation status was listed by the Livestock Conservancy as 'threatened', the second level of concern of the association..

== Characteristics ==
The Pineywoods is closely related to the Florida Cracker. It is small, with a body weight usually in the range 350 to 550 kg, 770-1250 lbs for bulls and 275 to 350 kg, 605-770 lbs for cows. The coat is very variable, and may be of many different multi-colored patterns or almost any solid color.. The cattle are usually horned, though polled examples are also seen; the horns are variable in shape and may be crumpled or twisted, short or long.

The cattle are long-lived, hardy and rugged; they are able to forage on poor pasture, show good resistance to parasites and display high tolerance of the heat and humidity of the south-eastern United States.

== Use ==
The Pineywoods was traditionally a triple-purpose breed, used for animal traction, for milk and for beef production.
