= Raramuri Criollo =

Mexican breed or type of Criollo cattle

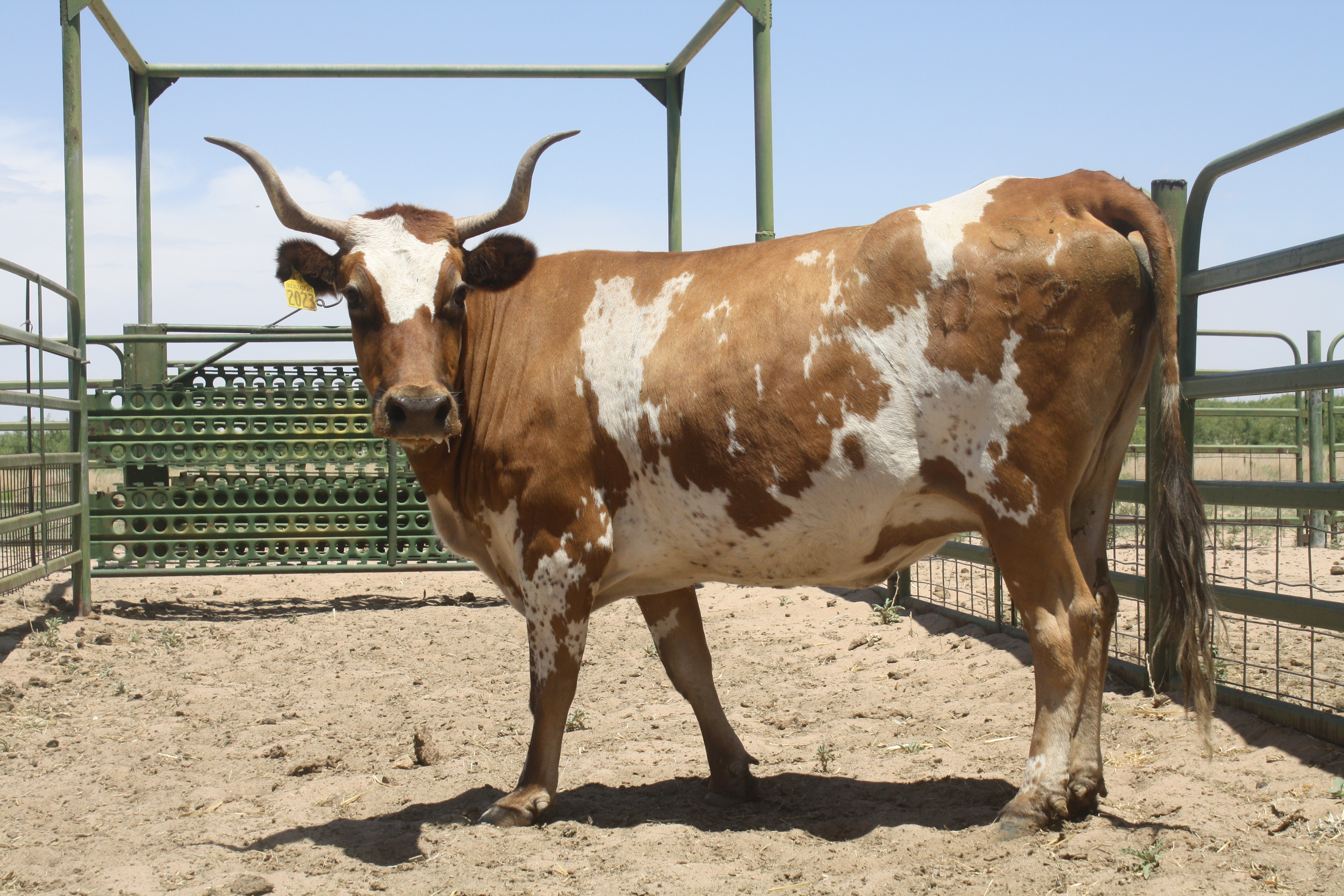
- Conservation status: Research
- Country of origin: Mexico
- Distribution: Mexico and United States
- Use: Beef, conservation grazing

Traits
- Weight: Male: 620 kg; Female: 370 kg
- Height: Male: 132.80 cm; Female: 122.05 cm
- Skin color: nude, black
- Coat: black, black and white, white gray, dun, brindle, red, dark red, red and white, blonde, gold, red-brown
- Horn status: Lyre

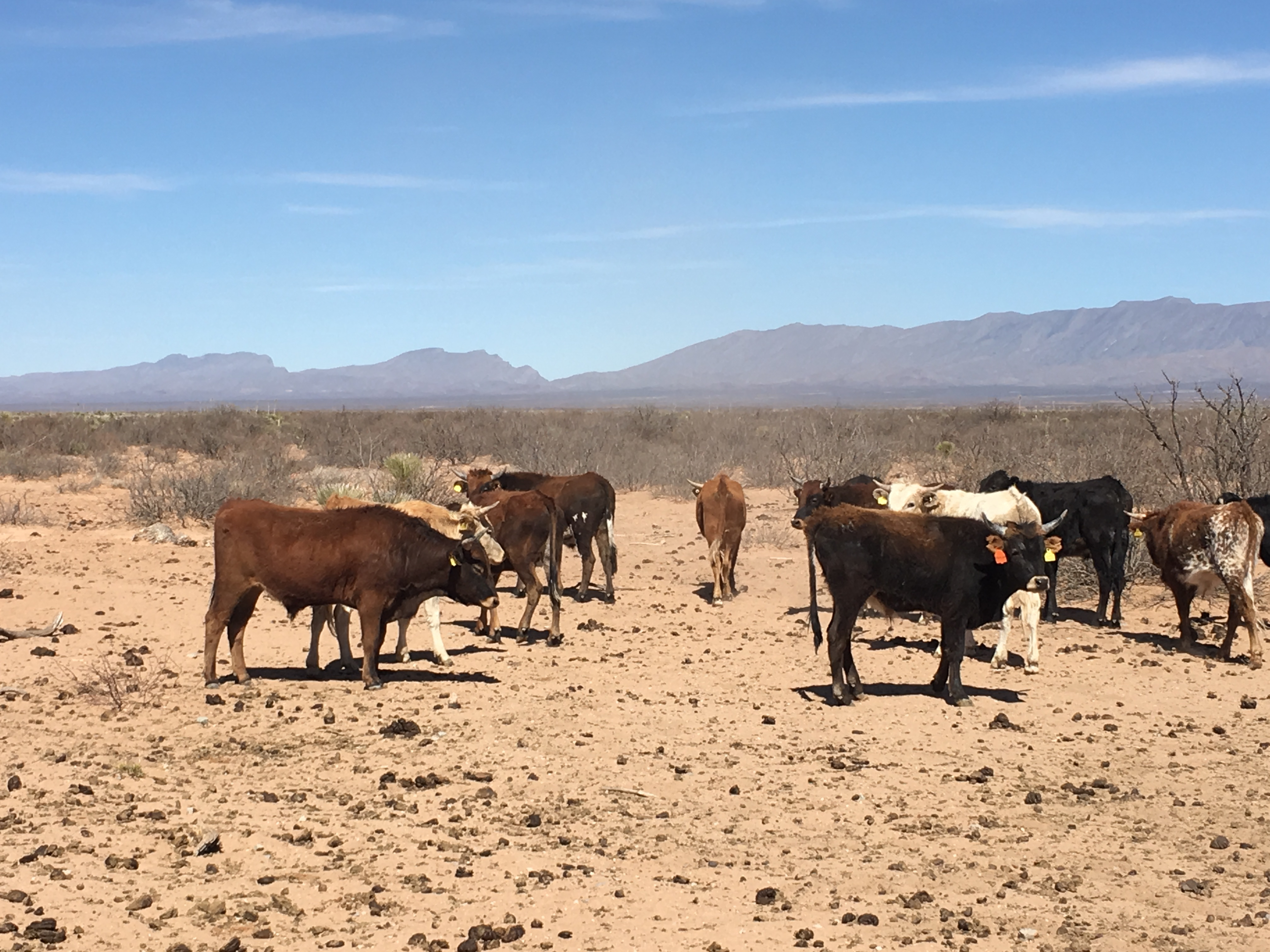
Yearling group of Raramuri Criollo Bulls at the Jornada Experimental Research Range, NM, USA.

The Rarámuri Criollo is a landrace biotype of Criollo cattle indigenous to the Sierra Tarahumara region of the Copper Canyon, Mexico. In 2005 a small group was introduced to the Jornada Experimental Range (JER) in New Mexico, in the United States for scientific study.

== History ==
Rarámuri Criollo cattle are descendants of the first cattle brought to Mexico by Hernán Cortés and Villalobos. Until recently, this biotype was geographically isolated between Chínipas and Témoris, Chihuahua in the remote Rio Oteros region of the Copper Canyon, home to the Tarahumara. The Tarahumara, who also call themselves Rarámuri, meaning "fleet foot", have raised this biotype for over 500 years. The Rarámuri typically used the cattle for milk and companionship, wherein animals were often kept indoors adjacent to the house as a source of winter heat. The Rarámuri Criollo experienced little-to-no artificial selection and is suspected to have little-to-no genetic introgression from outside breeds, therefore scientists consider it important to preserve their unique genetic and behavioral characteristics.

== Characteristics ==
The Rarámuri Criollo has characteristic lyrate horns like those of its ancestors and exhibits a wide variety of coat colors, which include solid black, white, gray, dun, blonde, gold, red-brown, red, and dark red, as well as brindle and spotted variations of those colors. The biotype is generally smaller than other beef breeds, but is large among North American Criollo cattle relatives like closely related Corriente and other Mexican biotype counterparts (e.g., Mixteco, Fronterizo, etc.). Rarámuri Criollo are sexually dimorphic and typically cows weigh ~370 kg (816 lbs), while bulls can weigh more than 620 kg (1367 lbs). Bull horns are often curved down and out around their head, and cow horns are typically lyrate and in an upward direction. Currently, no registered breed association exists for the biotype, but they are regarded as an individual among other Criollo cattle.

== Behavior ==
In collaborative ethological scientific studies between the USDA-ARS's JER, New Mexico State University, and Universidad Autónoma de Chihuahua, Rarámuri Criollo cows have consistently exhibited unique behavioral traits when compared to traditional British breeds. For instance, they tend to explore larger areas and travel further distances per day, especially in the harsh dry seasons of the American southwest.

These animals have also been shown to exhibit a different mothering style during early infantile calf stages, wherein cows and calves act as "followers" (young are kept closer to the mother) as opposed to "hiders" (young are hidden or kept with a guardian cow during foraging bouts) as do British crossbreds (eg. Black Baldies).

These cattle are under continuous scientific study because these behavioral traits are suspected to be more environmentally sustainable, especially under the impending threat of climate change, than those exhibited by more traditional breeds as increased exploration, reduced water dependency, and spatial non-constraints by calving mean that cows are less likely to overuse patches of vulnerable desert vegetation thus ensuring resilience of those biological rangeland resources.

== Uses ==
The ancestors of Rarámuri Criollo were initially used by early Spanish explorers and the Tarahumara for milk, draught, and companionship, but the biotypes is now considered a novel beef breed, which could be used for climate change adaptation and conservation grazing management strategies . Some preliminary analyses show that Rarámuri Criollo have an exceptionally long reproductive lifespan (> 22 years). Other baseline data indicates that grass-finished steers will weigh 800 - 1000 lbs at 30 months of age and yield extremely tender meat, suggesting that they may be a viable alternative for producers seeking to raise grass-fed cattle in arid environments with limited resources.

== See also ==
- Rarámuri people
- Criollo Cattle
- Rangeland management
