= Tabapuan =

Breed of cattle

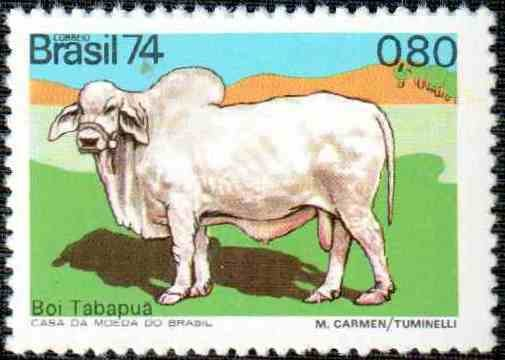

Tabapuan is a Brazilian type of polled beef cattle whose breed is a mixture of Zebu and Mocho Nacional. They are well known for their ability to survive in the tropics.

== Etymology ==
The name comes from the Brazilian city called Tabapuã, where many bulls of this race were initially found decades ago.

== History ==
The Tabapuã breed was the first humped cattle developed in Brazil as the result of undetermined crossings between Nellore, Guzerat cattle and a little Gir cattle, in the 1940s in Água Milagrosa farm, located in Tabapuã city, São Paulo State, Brazil. The "polled cattle factor" originates from the "Mocho National" cattle breed, the descendants of European cattle. The breed is of great economic importance in meat production in Brazil and it is also relevant cattle for its impressive ability to adapt to different environmental conditions. Tabapuã cattle are distributed throughout Brazil and are exported to Argentina, Uruguay, Venezuela and other countries.

== Population ==
Though this breed's population is increasing quickly, it still only accounts for less than 5% of Brazilian beef cattle. A high level of inbreeding in this breed is decreasing their genetic gains.
