= Florida Cracker cattle =

American breed of cattle

Florida Cracker
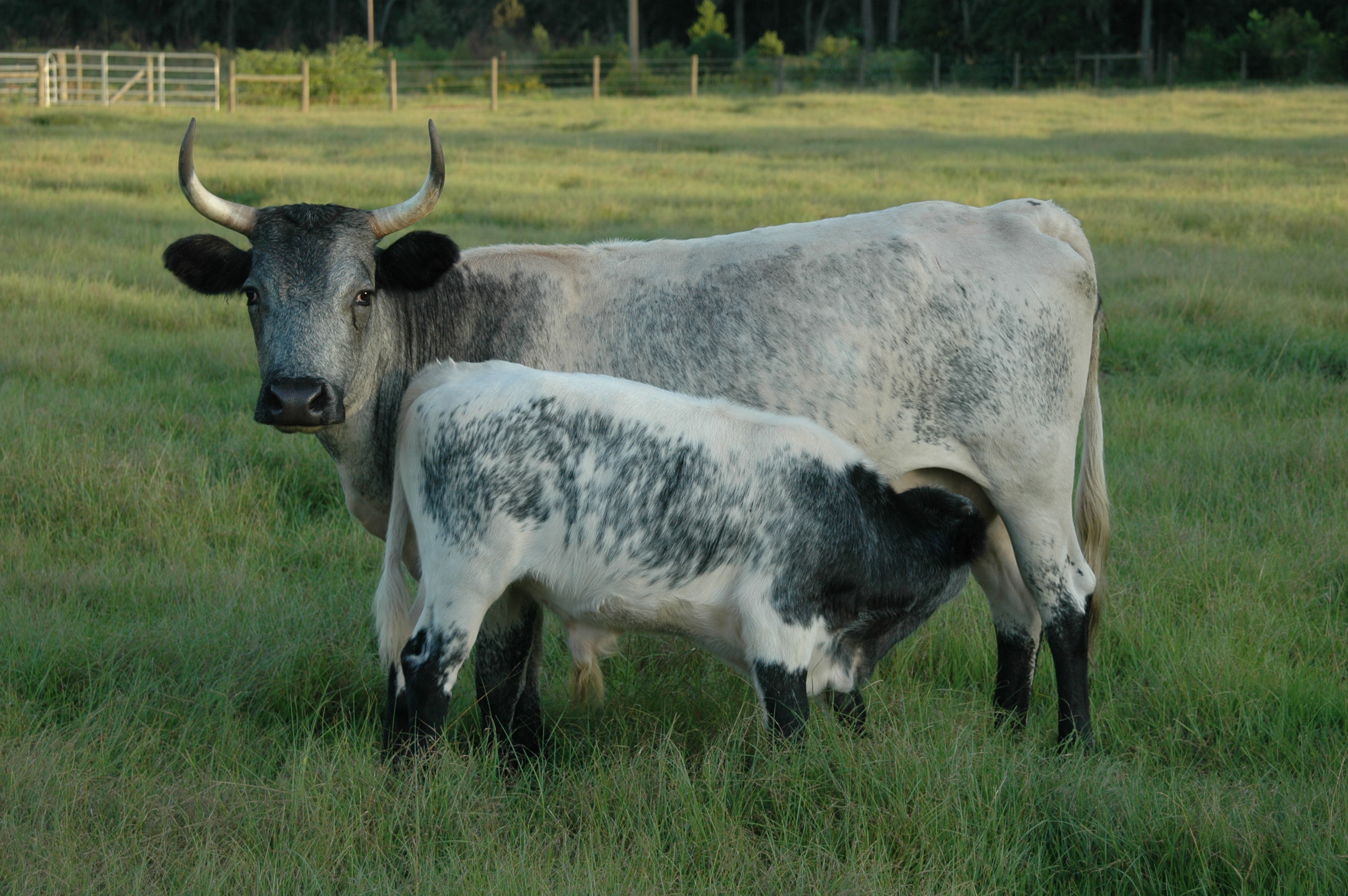
- Cow and calf
- Conservation status: FAO (2007): endangered; DAD-IS (2022): at risk/vulnerable; Livestock Conservancy (2022): threatened
- Other names: Florida Scrub; Florida Native Cattle
- Country of origin: United States
- Distribution: fifteen states, from the eastern seaboard to Montana
- Use: formerly triple-purpose; heritage conservation

Traits
- Weight: Male: 360–550 kg (800–1200 lb); Female: 270–360 kg (600–800 lb)
- Coat: very variable
- Horn status: horned in both sexes
- Cattle; Bos (primigenius) taurus

The Florida Cracker or Florida Scrub is an American breed of cattle. It originated in Spanish Florida and later in the American state of Florida and is named for the Florida cracker culture in which it was kept. It is one of the Criollo breeds that descend from the Spanish cattle originally brought to the Americas by the Spanish conquistadores; among the other North American breeds in this group are the Pineywoods, the Corriente and Texas Longhorn. Unlike the Pineywoods – to which it is closely related – the Florida Cracker has not been inter-bred with breeds of North European origin.

== History ==
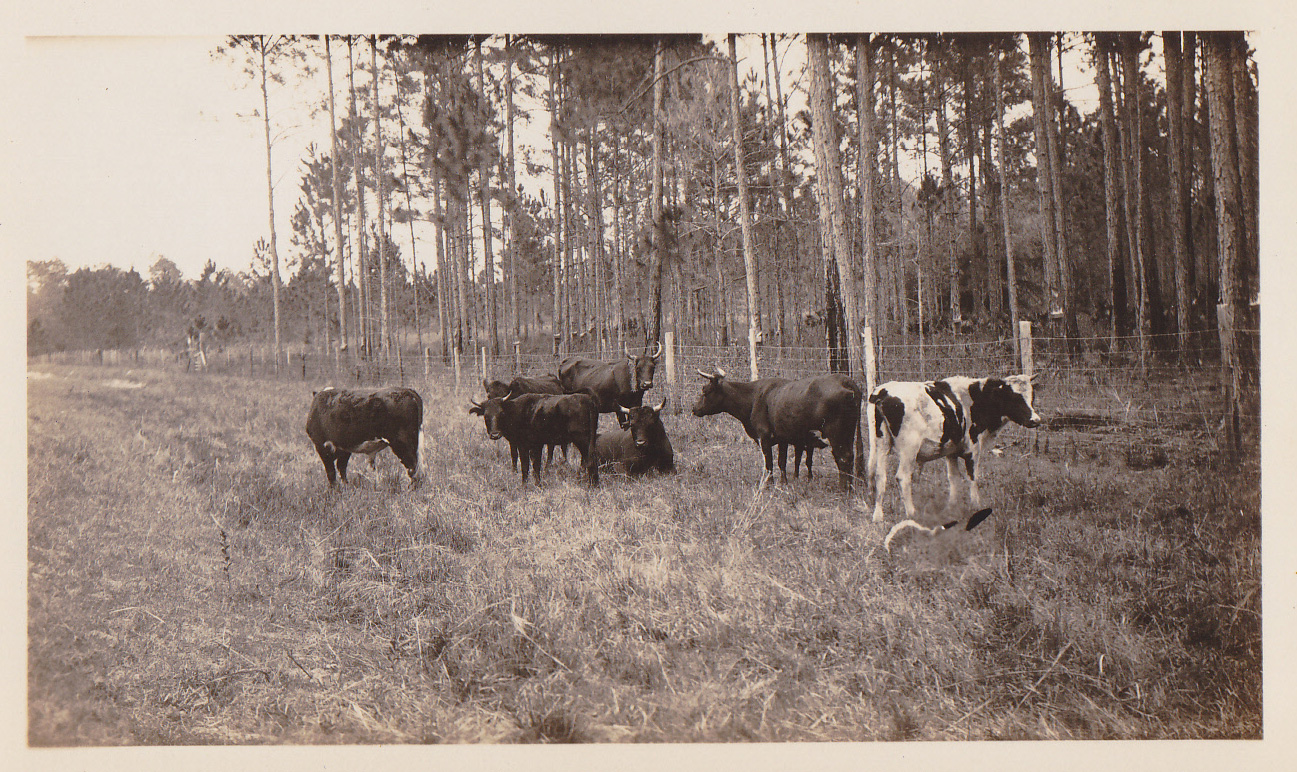
On Newberry Road outside Gainesville, Florida, in about 1930

The Florida Cracker, like other Criollo breeds, derives from cattle brought by the conquistadores from Spain to the Americas from 1493 onwards; these numbered no more than 300 head in all and were brought to Hispaniola and other Caribbean islands. Cattle from Cuba were landed in Spanish Florida in 1565, and there was another shipment from the same source in 1640. By the beginning of the eighteenth century the number of cattle in the Spanish part of what is now the United States – Florida and parts of modern Alabama, Georgia and Mississippi – was estimated at between 15000 and 20000 head. These were triple-purpose cattle, reared for meat, for milk and for draft work. They were managed extensively, living in semi-feral conditions for much of the time.

The cattle were the principal breed in the state until the early twentieth century, when heat-tolerant zebuine cattle such as the Brahman began to arrive, soon followed by taurine cattle of European origin. By the middle of the century indiscriminate cross-breeding of these with the Cracker cattle had brought the Florida breed to the point of disappearance; after 1949 laws relating to free-roaming livestock also contributed to the rapid decline of the Florida Cracker. The Florida state government has been active in the conservation of the breed since the 1970s; a breed society, the Florida Cracker Cattle Association, was formed in 1989 with the support of the state, and in 1991 a herd-book was established.

In 2010 the breed population was about 1300 head, with some 500 breeding cows and about 150 bulls; in 2022 the number was estimated to be between 2500 and 5000 head. The conservation status of the breed is listed as 'threatened' by The Livestock Conservancy. The Florida Cracker is included in the Ark of Taste of the international Slow Food Foundation. In 2018 it was declared the official state heritage cattle breed.

== Characteristics ==
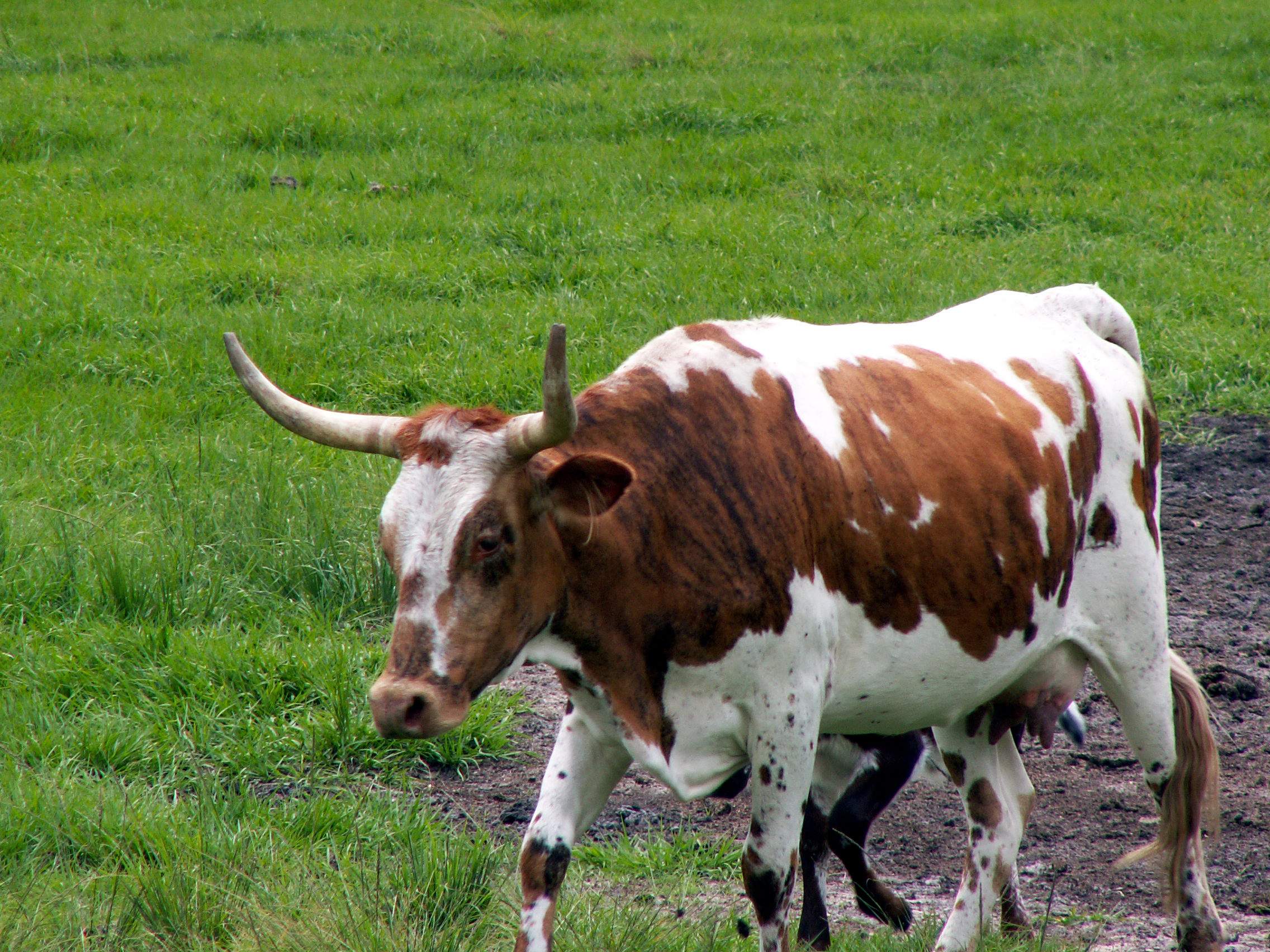
Cow with calf (standing behind her, parts of its body creating the illusion of supernumerary teats "on" the mother)

The cattle are generally small, with weights in the range 360 to 550 kg for bulls and 270 to 360 kg for cows; in the past there was a still smaller or dwarf type within the breed, known as the Guinea, which weighed about 230 kg (500 lb) or less. Coat color and pattern is highly variable; the predominant coat types depend partly on the geographical area: solid blacks, duns and reds, with or without brindling, are more common in southern Florida, while color-sided, finched, roan and spotted patterns are more often seen in the northern part of the state. The horns are variable in both shape and size, and naturally polled animals also occur.

== See also ==
- Agriculture in Florida
- Florida Cracker horse
