= American Milking Devon =

American breed of cattle

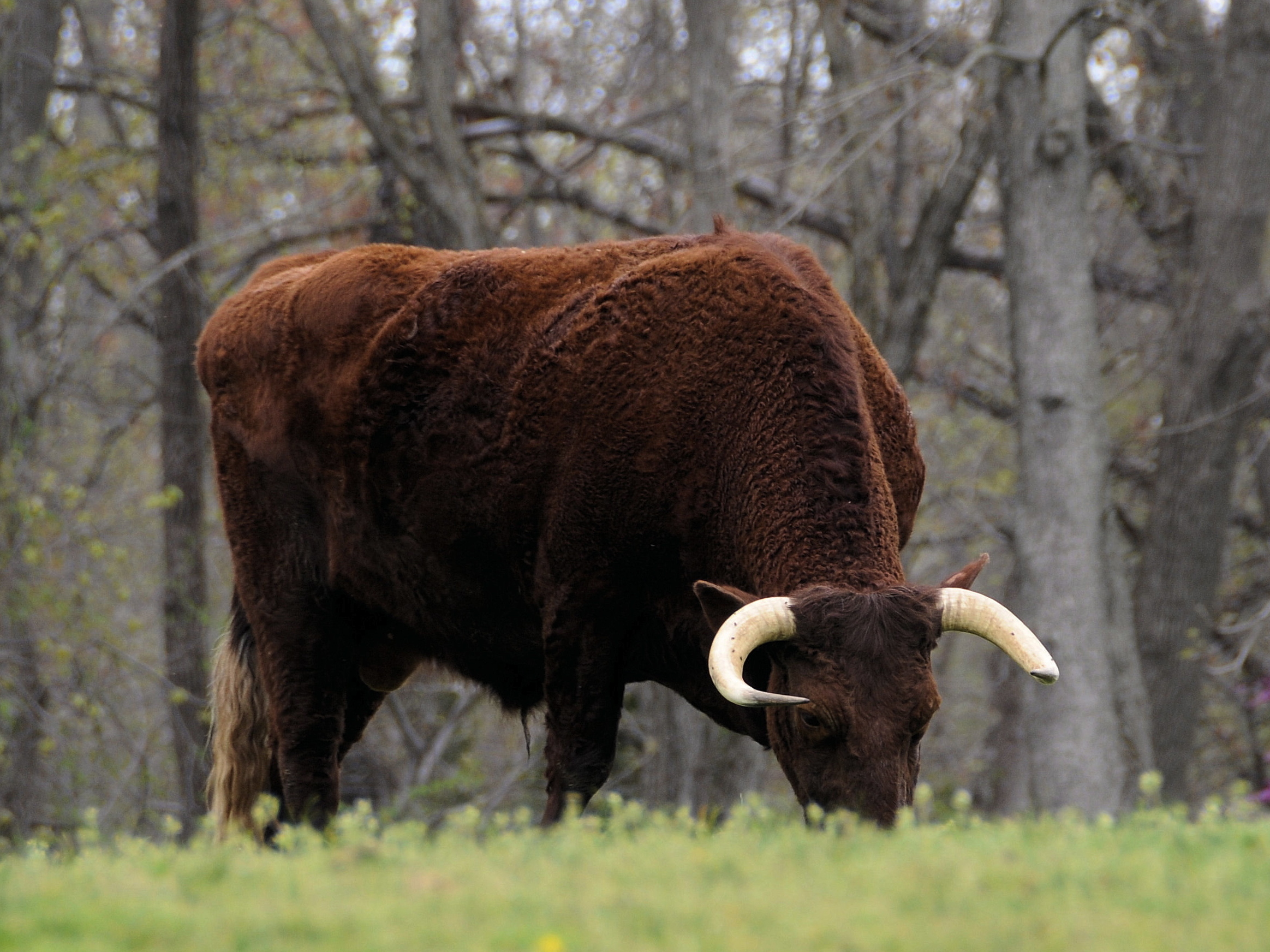
- A bull at Mount Vernon
- Conservation status: FAO (2007): endangered; DAD-IS (2022): endangered-maintained; Livestock Conservancy (2022): critical
- Country of origin: United States
- Distribution: United States; Canada
- Use: dual-purpose, milk and beef

Traits
- Weight: Male: 500–600 kg; Female: 400–500 kg
- Coat: red
- Horn status: horns of medium size
- Cattle; Bos (primigenius) taurus

The American Milking Devon is an American breed of dual-purpose cattle, reared both for milk and for beef. It derives from the Devon cattle of the United States, which in turn are derived from the North Devon cattle of south-west England. It was established as a separate breed in 1978 with the formation of the American Milking Devon Cattle Association, after the breeding aims of the Devon were concentrated almost exclusively on beef production. It is a rare breed: its conservation status is listed as by the Livestock Conservancy as 'critical'.

== History ==
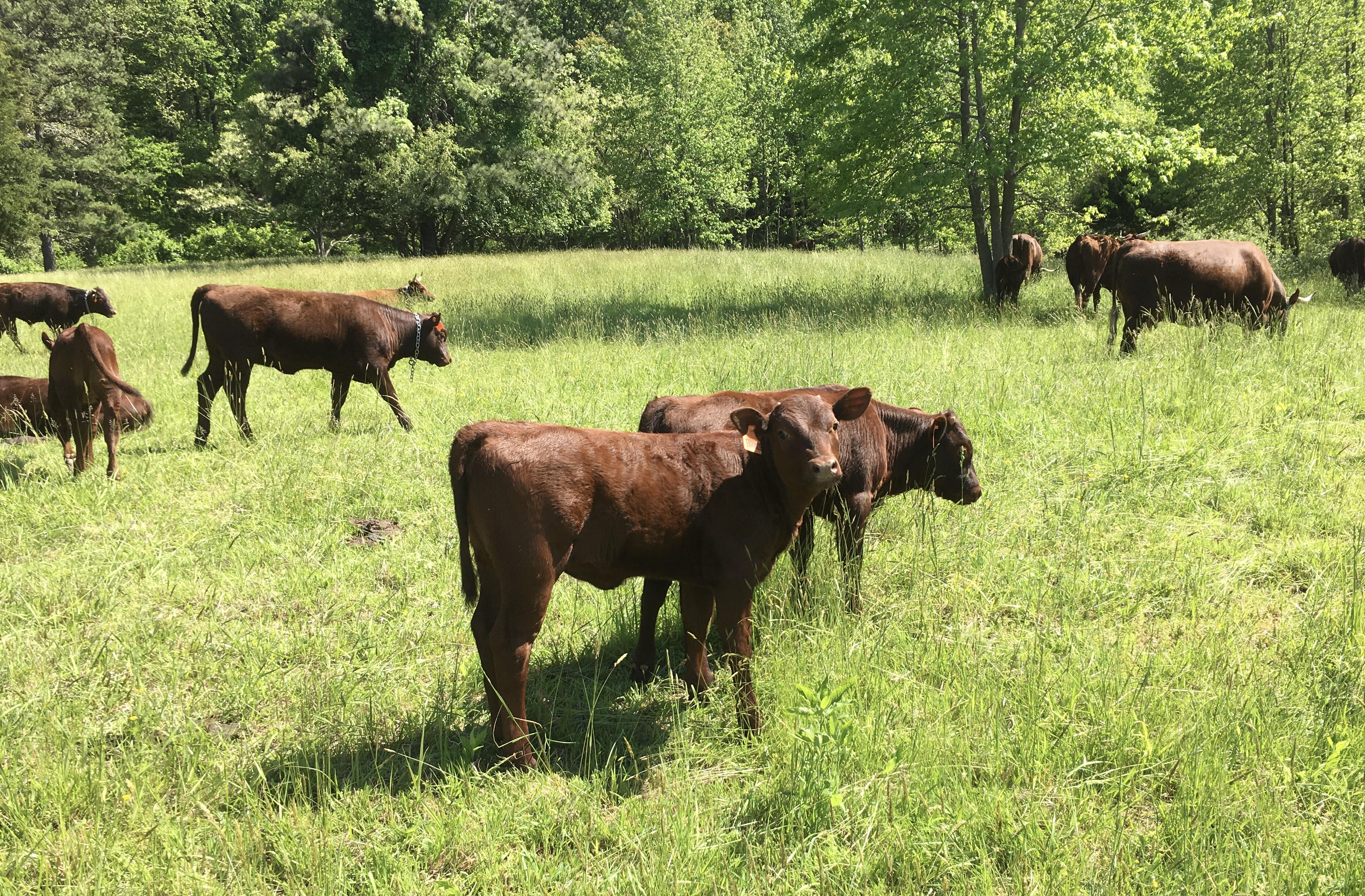
Calves in a field at the National Colonial Farm at Piscataway Park

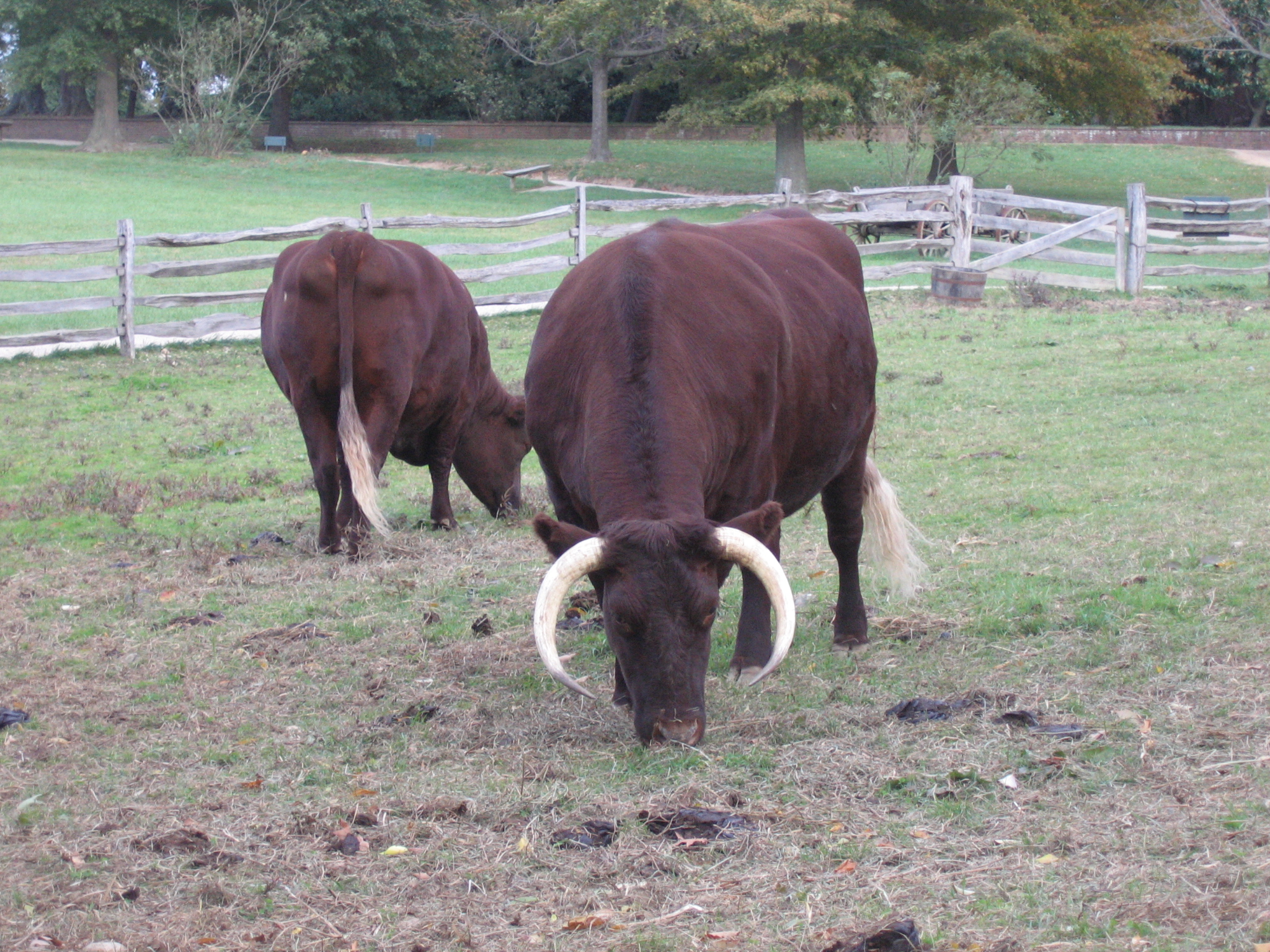
At Mount Vernon

In 1624, the first cattle – three heifers and a bull – were brought by Edward Winslow from the county of Devon in south-west England to the Plymouth Colony, in what would later be Massachusetts. The cattle were shipped from the port of Plymouth on the south coast of Devon, and may have been called 'Devon' for that reason only – the English Devon cattle breed had at that time not yet come into existence. Over the next two centuries a population of cattle of this type was built up, and gradually spread along the east coast as far south as Florida.

From the early nineteenth century, British cattle were imported to New England with the aim of upgrading the Devon. At first these were English Longhorns; they were followed by Durham (Shorthorn) stock, and then by stock of the now-improved and established North Devon breed from both Devon and Norfolk. It is likely that in the first part of the century no other breed was imported to New England in such large numbers. A herd-book was first published in 1855, and a breed association, the American Devon Cattle Club, was formed in the latter part of the nineteenth century.

By 1900 the Devon was rarely found outside New England, and elsewhere in the United States had been largely supplanted by the more productive Shorthorn. In the twentieth century the mechanization of agriculture and the development of specialized meat and milk breeds meant that there was little or no remaining demand for triple-purpose cattle; the breeding aims of the Devon were concentrated almost exclusively on beef production. The American Milking Devon was established as a separate breed in 1978 with the formation of the American Milking Devon Cattle Association; the aim was to preserve the older colonial type of multi-purpose cattle.

The Milking Devon is a rare breed: the Livestock Conservancy lists its conservation status as 'critical', its highest level of concern; the DAD-IS database of the FAO lists it as 'at risk'/'critical-maintained'. It was formerly included in the Slow Food Ark of Taste.

It is distributed in thirty-four American states, and is also present in Canada. In 2016 a total population of 211 head was reported; in 2021 the Livestock Conservancy estimated the total number to be approximately 500.

== Characteristics ==
The American Milking Devon is of medium size: bulls weigh some 500–600 kg (1100–1300 lb), cows about 100 kg (220 lb) less. The coat is a dark, glossy ruby-red. The horns are of medium length, white with black tips. It is physically hardy, with good resistance to harsh weather, and does well on a low-input diet high in forage.

== Use ==
The Devon was traditionally a triple-purpose breed, reared for draft work, for milk and for beef. The modern American Milking Devon is a dual-purpose animal, providing both meat and milk, and is also kept for cultural heritage reasons. It may still be used for draft purposes.
