= Beef Shorthorn =

Breed of cattle

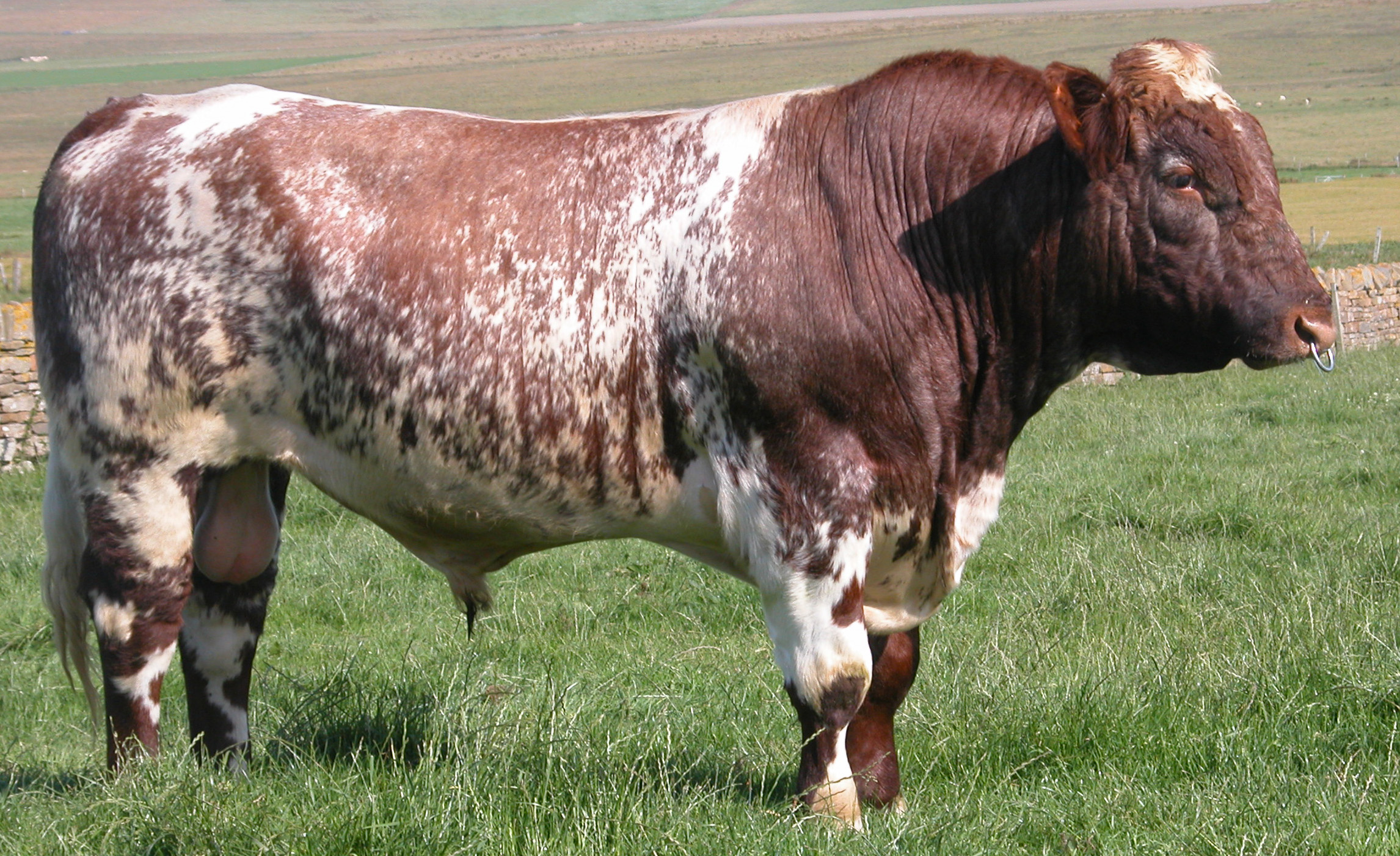
- A Beef Shorthorn bull.
- Conservation status: Least Concern
- Country of origin: UK (England and Scotland)
- Use: Beef
- Cattle; Bos (primigenius) taurus

The Beef Shorthorn breed of cattle was developed from the Shorthorn breed in England and Scotland around 1820. The Shorthorn was originally developed as a dual-purpose breed, suitable for both dairy and beef production. However, different breeders opted to concentrate on one purpose rather than the other, and in 1958, the beef breeders started their own section of the herdbook. Since then, the Beef Shorthorns have been developed as a separate breed to the Dairy Shorthorn.

By the early 1970s, the Beef Shorthorn breeders were concerned their cattle were too small and lacked muscle, especially when compared with the continental breeds of cattle, such as the Charolais or Limousin – that were starting to be introduced to the UK. To help remedy this, in 1976, the Beef Shorthorn Cattle Society sanctioned the introduction of Maine-Anjou blood into the breed. The Maine-Anjou breed, developed in France, was descended from the same Durham cattle as the Shorthorn. The decision to introduce Maine-Anjou blood into the Beef Shorthorn breed was very controversial at the time, but most breeders now acknowledge it was a necessary step which saved the breed from irrelevance. The herd book was closed to Maine-Anjou blood lines in 2001, except by introduction through the Grading Register.

The Beef Shorthorn breed is not considered at risk by the Rare Breeds Survival Trust, since more than 1,500 registered breeding females are found in the United Kingdom.
