= Corriente =

American breed of cattle

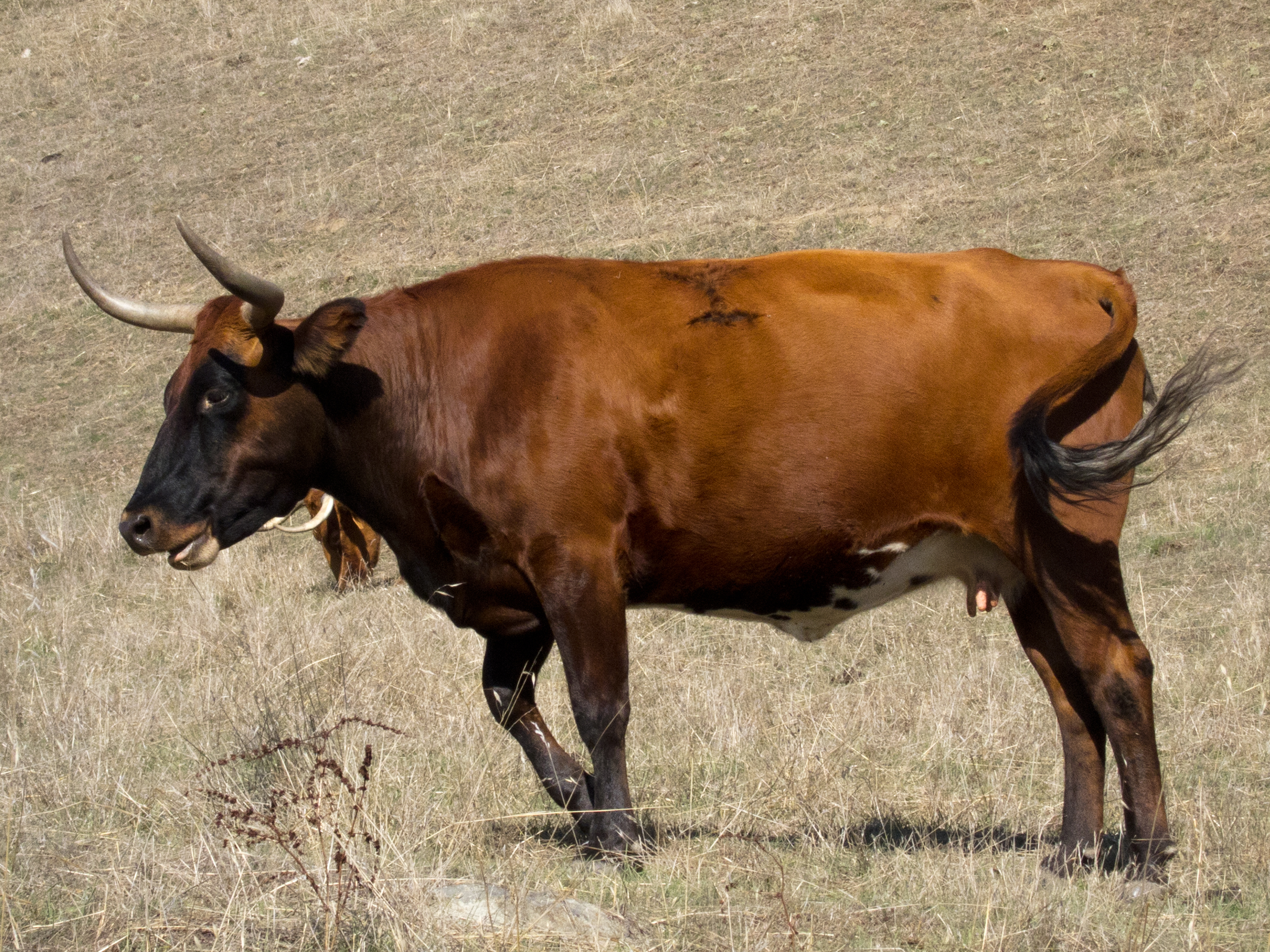
- Conservation status: FAO (2007): not listed; DAD-IS (2023): unknown
- Country of origin: United States
- Use: rodeo; beef

Traits
- Weight: Male: 454 kg (1000 lb); Female: 363 kg (800 lb)
- Coat: black, brindle, paint
- Horn status: long, forward-curving
- Cattle; Bos (primigenius) taurus

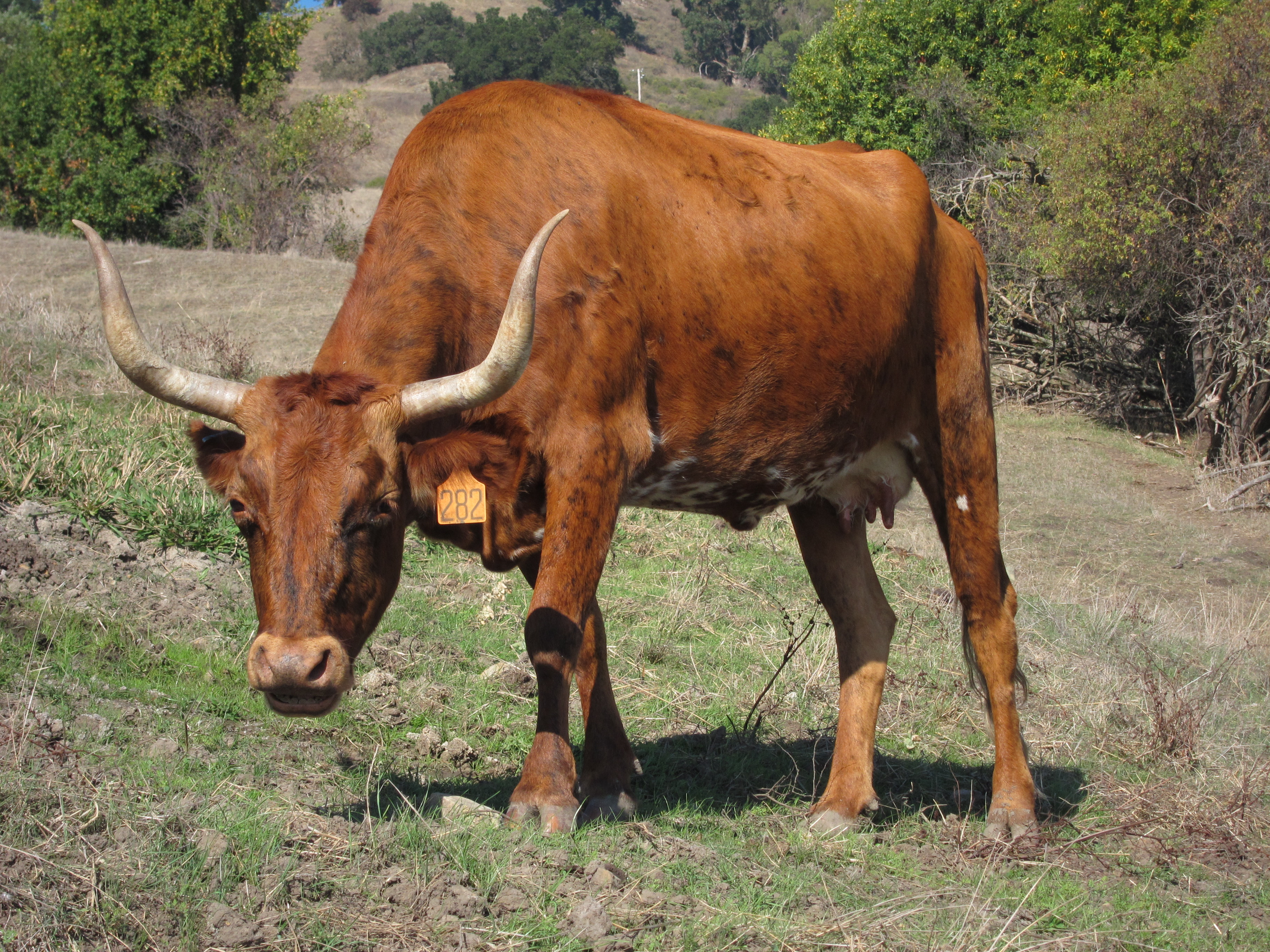
A cow in California

The Corriente is an American breed of small cattle, used principally for rodeo events. It derives from Criollo Mexicano stock, which in turn descends from Iberian cattle brought to the Americas by the Conquistadores, and introduced in the sixteenth and seventeenth centuries to various parts of what is now Mexico.

A breed association, the North American Corriente Association, was formed in 1982.

== History ==
Iberian cattle were brought to the Americas by the Conquistadores, and were introduced in the sixteenth and seventeenth centuries to various parts of what is now Mexico. From these the various types or breeds of Criollo Mexicano have developed.

Small cattle for use in rodeo events were exported to the United States in large numbers from the Mexican states of Chihuahua and Sonora, although in the late twentieth century this became difficult as a result of stringent border regulations. In Chihuahua annual exports were in the region of 40000 head, and 'Criollo de Rodeo' became an alternate name for the Criollo di Chihuahua; in Sonora, where the Frijolillo is the predominant Criollo breed, small cattle of any kind were commonly known as 'Corriente', meaning 'running'. When a breed association for rodeo cattle was formed in the United States in 1982, this was name chosen for the new breed, and the association was called the North American Corriente Association. The foundation stock of the Corriente breed included some Florida Scrub cattle and other similar cattle from Louisiana.

In 2010 the number of breeding cows was 1127. In 2016 there were 114 breeders of the Corriente.

== Characteristics ==
Like other Criollo cattle of the Americas and many breeds of southern Europe, the Corriente is principally of taurine (European) derivation, but has a small admixture of indicine genetic heritage; this may be a consequence of gene flow across the Strait of Gibraltar from cattle of African origin dating to before the time of the Spanish Conquest. A single-nucleotide polymorphism genotyping study in 2013 found the level of zebuine introgression in the Corriente to be approximately 10%, not significantly different from that seen in the Colombian Romosinuano and the Texas Longhorn.

The Corriente is small, with an average weight of 363 kg for cows and 454 kg for bulls. It is lean, agile and athletic. The horns come straight out and then curve forward and often slightly upward; they are heavy but not particularly long. The coat may be of any color but pure white. Solid, brindle and paint colors are seen.

== Use ==
The Corriente is primarily used for rodeo sports such as team roping and steer wrestling. It either is or is not also reared for beef; cattle no longer suitable for rodeo work may be fattened for slaughter. The meat is included in the Ark of Taste of the Slow Food Foundation for Biodiversity.
