= Mocho Nacional =

Breed of cattle

Mocho Nacional is a beef cattle breed created in Brazil during the 20th century. It is polled; Mocho Nacional means "national polled" in Portuguese. Like the Caracu, it is a European-origin breed, not Zebu. In Brazil, this breed represents less than 2% of beef cattle. Even with low popularity, it is one of the sources of the Tabapuan, another polled beef cattle breed of Brazil.
