= Romosinuano =

Breed of cattle

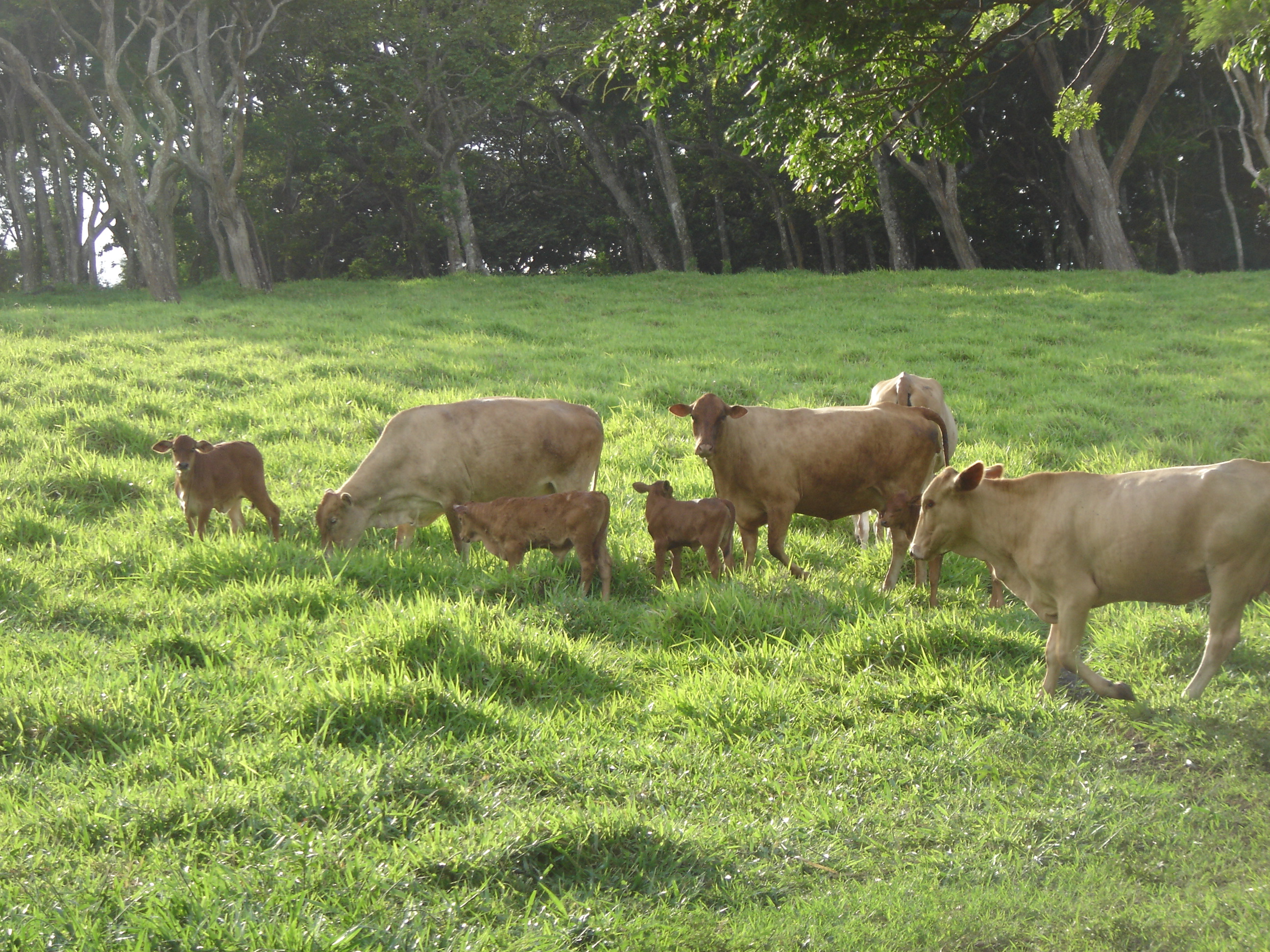
Romosinunao cows and calves

The Romosinuano is a breed of cattle native to Colombia. Its name derives from the fact that the breed is polled (romo) and that it originated from the Sinú River valley (sinuano). Romosinunao are a criollo type, developed from the horned Costeño con Cuernos breed of Spanish origin. It is unclear whether the polled nature of the Romosinuano was due to natural mutation or to cross-breeding with European types such as the Angus or Red Poll.

Romosinuano are beef cattle, and are noted for their docile temperament and adaptation to subtropical climates. Romosinuano lines also exist in Costa Rica and Venezuela, and have been imported to the United States for cross-breeding in the hopes of improving cattle production in Florida and similar states.
