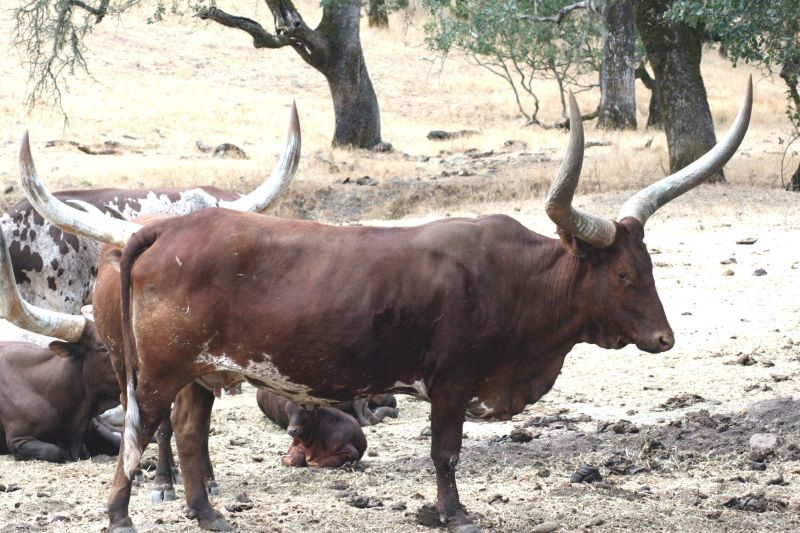
- Watusi cattle, a breed in the "Sanga" group.

Conservation status
- Domesticated

Scientific classification
- Kingdom: Animalia
- Phylum: Chordata
- Class: Mammalia
- Order: Artiodactyla
- Family: Bovidae
- Subfamily: Bovinae
- Genus: Bos
- Species: B. taurus
- Subspecies: B. t. africanus

Trinomial name
- Bos taurus africanus (unavailable name)

Synonyms
- Bos africanus Kerr, 1792; Bos sanga Fitzinger, 1860

= Sanga cattle =

Breed of cattle

Sanga cattle is the collective name for indigenous cattle of some regions in Africa. They are sometimes identified as a subspecies with the scientific name Bos taurus africanus. Their origin history of domestication and their origins in relation to taurine cattle, zebu cattle (indicine), and native African varieties of the ancestral aurochs are a matter of debate. "African taurine", "sanga", "zenga", "sheko", "African indicine" are all sub-groups of Sanga cattle.

== Genetic signatures and classification ==
A relatively complete survey on the many breeds of Sanga cattle is given by Kim et al. 2020. Admixture analysis from this paper groups Sanga cattle under this taxonomy:

- African taurine (N'Dama, Muturu)
- African humped cattle
  - African indicine (Mursi)
  - African zenga (Fogera, Horro)
  - African sanga (Ankole)
  - Sheko

In the analyses cited by Kim, African taurine (Bos taurus taurus) first split from Eurasian taurine. A group of Asian indicine cattle ("Zebu", B. t. indicus) split off in around 700 AD (around the time of Islamization of the East African coast) and mingled with African taurines in different ratios, producing the four groups of African humped cattle. In Kim's own analysis, African taurines gained key adaptations in 16 genes for immunity (most importantly, trypanosomosis tolerance), heat-tolerance, and reproduction. Even so-called "African indicine" contains significant amounts of African taurine adaptations to the African environment.

The existence of "taurine", "sanga", "zenga", and "indicine" groups among Africa cattle is generally agreed-upon by groups of researchers despite disagreements in how these groups originated. Specifically, the main topic in dispute is whether African taurines were separately domesticated.

Major groups of Sanga cattle

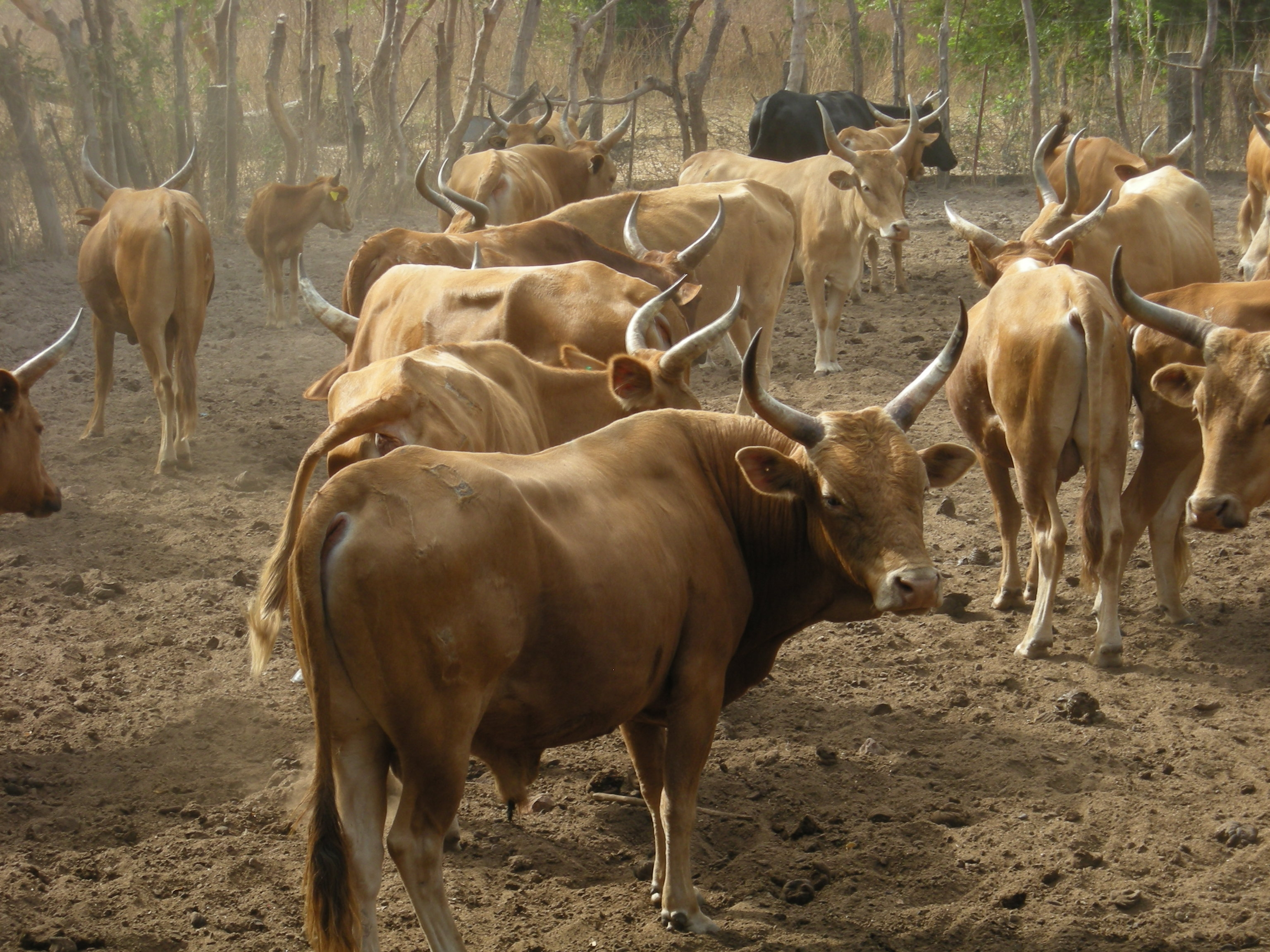
N'Dama (African taurine)

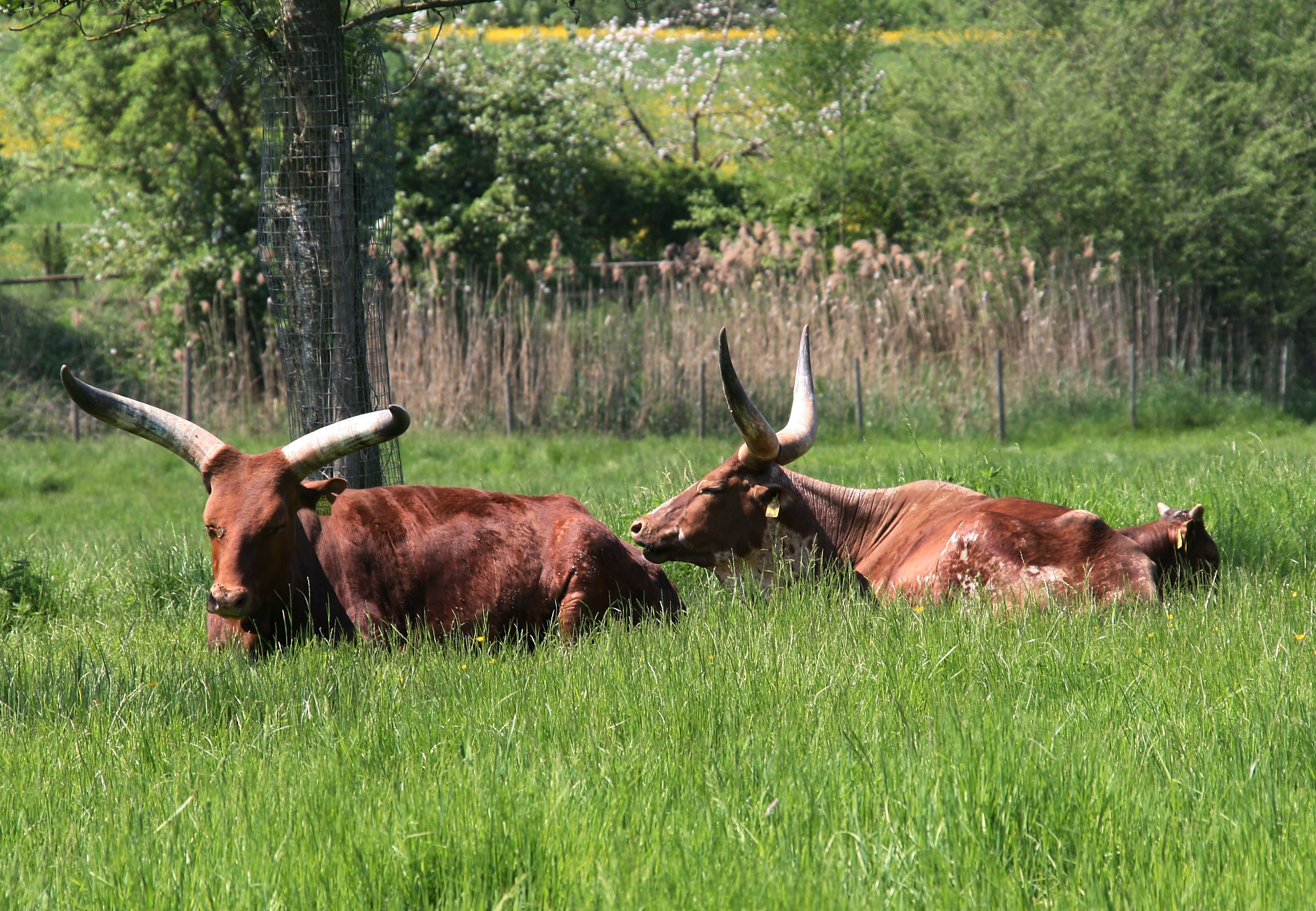
Watusi (Sanga)

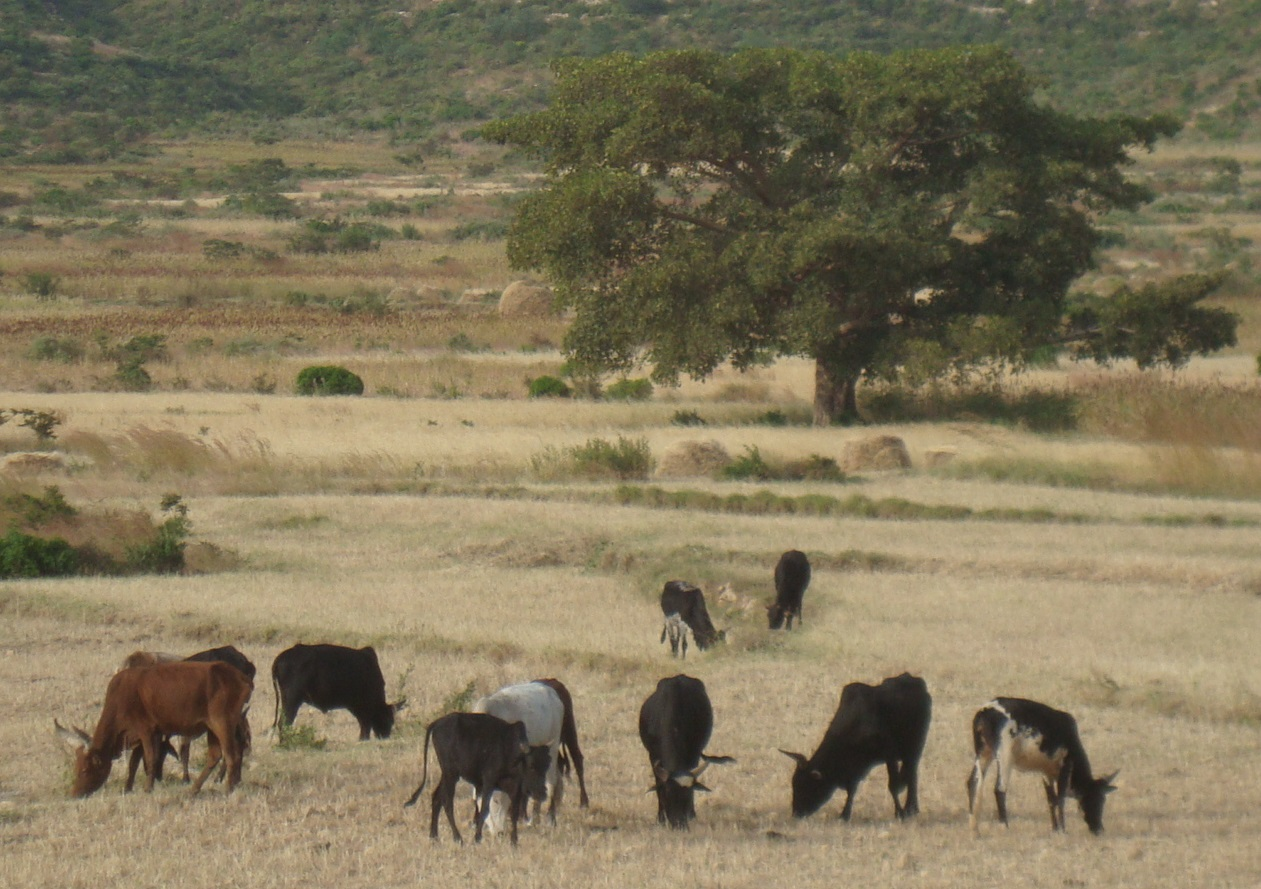
Arado (Zanga)

== Traits ==
=== Trypanotolerance ===
Trypanosomiasis poses a considerable constraint on livestock agricultural development in tsetse fly-infested areas of West and Central Africa. International research conducted by ILRI in Nigeria, the Democratic Republic of the Congo, and Kenya has shown that the N'Dama is the most resistant breed. In Nigeria, research has shown that N'Dama is up to two to three times more resistant (or 25% total) than Nguni cattle (about 8% total), and the F1 N'Dama × Nguni cross is about twice as resistant (16.5% overall) compared to pure Nguni. While in Kenya, research conducted by KALRO has shown a similarity with crossbreeding N'Dama with Boran cattle.

== Origins ==
The timeline for their history is the subject of extensive debate. A combination of genetic studies with archaeological research, including cultural history, has clarified the question of the complex origin of Sanga cattle in recent years.

=== Origin of the African taurine ===
==== Archaeological evidence ====
Morphological features of early Sanga cattle, such as lyre-shaped horns, are depicted on murals of Ancient Egypt.

==== Near-eastern introduction theory ====
The current African cattle population derives from three major introductions from Asia: The first cattle introduced into Africa, the humpless longhorn (B. t. longifrons) arrived around 5000 BC. They were followed by the humpless shorthorn (B. t. brachyceros) about 2,500 years later, and finally the humped zebu (B. indicus) around 1500 BC. Thus, Sanga cattle descend firstly from an aurochs domesticated in the Near East. After their introduction to Egypt, about 8000 years ago, they spread all over the Sahara, which was then still green, then to West Africa. The North African pastoralists interbred their domestic cattle with wild African aurochs of various regional races, both in the paternal and maternal lines over a long time, which is reflected in the genetic distinctness of Sanga cattle from both European/Near Eastern and from Indian Zebu cattle. Hereby special adaptations to the African climate and conditions were introduced that characterize Sanga cattle. African taurines are distinguished by having small cervicothoracic humps that are typical for (wild) aurochs, instead of the high thoracic humps that characterize the Zebu.

Rather than the domestication of cattle happening in the region of the Tadrart Acacus, domesticated cattle more likely were introduced to the region. Cattle are thought to not have entered Africa independently, but rather, are thought to have been brought into Africa by cattle pastoralists. By the end of the 8th millennium BP, domesticated cattle are thought to have been brought into the Central Sahara. The Central Sahara (e.g., Tin Hanakaten, Tin Torha, Uan Muhuggiag, Uan Tabu) was a major intermediary area for the distribution of domesticated animals from the Eastern Sahara to the Western Sahara.

Based on cattle remains near the Nile dated to 9000 BP and cattle remains near Nabta Playa and Bir Kiseiba reliably dated to 7750 BP, domesticated cattle may have appeared much earlier, near the Nile, and then expanded to the western region of the Sahara. Though undomesticated aurochs are shown, via archaeological evidence and rock art, to have dwelled in Northeast Africa, aurochs are thought to have been independently domesticated in India and the Near East. After aurochs were domesticated in the Near East, cattle pastoralists may have migrated, along with domesticated aurochs, through the Nile Valley and, by ~8000 BP, through Wadi Howar, into the Central Sahara.

The mitochondrial divergence of undomesticated Indian cattle, European cattle, and Sanga cattle (Bos primigenius) from one another in 25,000 BP is viewed as evidence supporting the conclusion that cattle may have been domesticated in Northeast Africa, particularly, the eastern region of the Sahara, between 10,000 BP and 8000 BP. Cattle (Bos) remains may date as early as 9000 BP in Bir Kiseiba and Nabta Playa. While the mitochondrial divergence between Eurasian and Sanga cattle in 25,000 BP can be viewed as supportive evidence for cattle being independently domesticated in Africa, introgression from undomesticated Sanga cattle in Eurasian cattle may provide an alternative interpretation of this evidence.

==== Independent domestication theory ====
These cattle would have originated in the regions of North Africa, as a variant of the indigenous African aurochs, but would have been domesticated in the Sudan. The domestication of African cattle would have been independent from, but contemporary with the Middle-East. Sanga are an intermediate type, probably formed by hybridizing the indigenous humpless cattle with Zebu cattle. However, archaeological evidence indicates this cattle type was domesticated independently in Africa, and bloodlines of taurine and zebu cattle were introduced only within the last few hundred years. Nonetheless, the time and location for when and where cattle were domesticated in Africa remains to be resolved.

Osypińska (2021) indicates that an "archaeozoological discovery made at Affad turned out to be of great importance for the entire history of cattle on the African continent. A large skull fragment and a nearly complete horn core of an aurochs, a wild ancestor of domestic cattle, were discovered at sites dating back 50,000 years and associated with the MSA. These are the oldest remains of the auroch in Sudan, and they also mark the southernmost range of this species in the world. Based on the cattle (Bos) remains found at Affad and Letti, Osypiński (2022) indicates that it is "justified to raise again the issue of the origin of cattle in Northeast Africa. The idea of domestic cattle in Africa coming from the Fertile Crescent exclusively is now seen as having serious shortcomings." Osypiński (2025) would further conclude, and present similar findings to the previous reports based on new osteometric data from the Letti desert in Sudan.

The managing of Barbary sheep may be viewed as parallel evidence for the domestication of cattle amid the early period of the Holocene. Near Nabta Playa, in the Western Desert, between 11th millennium cal BP and 10th millennium cal BP, semi-sedentary African hunter-gatherers may have independently domesticated African cattle as a form of reliable food source and as a short-term adaptation to the dry period of the Green Sahara, which resulted in a limited availability of edible flora. Bos primigenius (Aurochs) fossils, which have been dated between 11th millennium cal BP and 10th millennium cal BP, have been found at Bir Kiseiba and Nabta Playa. The earliest evidence of domestic cattle from the central Sahara dates, however, to the eighth millennium BP.

In the Western Desert, at the E-75-6 archaeological site, amid 10th millennium cal BP and 9th millennium cal BP, African pastoralists may have managed North African cattle (Bos primigenius) and continually used the watering basin and well and as water source. In the northern region of Sudan, at El Barga, cattle fossils found in a human burial serve as supportive evidence for cattle being in the area.

While this does not negate that it is possible for cattle from the Near East to have migrated into Africa, a greater number of African cattle in the same area share the T1 mitochondrial haplogroup and atypical haplotypes than in other areas, which provides support for Africans independently domesticating African cattle. Based on a small sample size (SNPs from sequences of whole genomes), African cattle split early from European cattle (Taurine). African cattle, bearing the Y2 haplogroup, form a sub-group within the overall group of taurine cattle. As a Near Eastern origin of African cattle requires a conceptual bottleneck to sustain the view, the diverseness of the Y2 haplogroup and T1 haplogroup do not support the view of a bottleneck having occurred, and thus, does not support a Near Eastern origin for African cattle. Altogether, these forms of genetic evidence provide the strongest support for the independent domestication of African cattle.

=== Origin of indicine contribution ===
Indian humped cattle (Bos indicus) and North African/Middle Eastern taurine cattle (Bos taurus) are commonly assumed to have admixed with one another, resulting in Sanga cattle as their offspring. Rather than accept the common assumption, admixture with taurine and humped cattle is viewed as having likely occurred within the last few hundred years, and Sanga cattle are viewed as having originated from among African cattle within Africa. Regarding possible origin scenarios for African Sanga cattle, domesticated taurine cattle were introduced into North Africa, admixed with undomesticated African cattle (Bos primigenius opisthonomous), resulting in offspring (the oldest being the Egyptian/Sudanese longhorn, some to all of which are viewed as Sanga cattle), or more likely, domesticated African cattle originated in Africa (including Egyptian longhorn), and became regionally diversified (e.g., taurine cattle in North Africa, zebu cattle in East Africa).

20th century authors date the first Sanga cattle, which originated through by crossing in of Zebu bulls in northeast and east Africa, from 1600 BCE onward. Kim et al. (2020) reports a consensus date of 700 AD among contemporary researchers and their own estimate date of 950–1250 AD. Kim et al. (2023) does not report a different date, but finds that the indicine import is mostly similar to North Indian breeds, with a small South Indian contribution.

== List of breeds ==
The list of breeds below follow the framework of Kim et al. 2020. It includes contributions from Rege 1999, which has a very similar grouping (albeit the evolutionary theory is different).

=== African taurine ===
- N'dama
- Kuri cattle
- Lagune or Dahomey cattle
- Ghana shorthorn and dwarf shorthorn
- Baoule cattle
- Somba cattle
- Kapsiki cattle
- Namchi cattle
- Bakosi cattle
- Muturu cattle
  - Forest or dwarf Muturu (Liberian dwarf Muturu, Ghanaian dwarf Muturu, Nigerian dwarf Muturu)
  - Savanna Muturu
- Humpless shorthorns

=== Sanga cattle ===
Sanga are crosses between African taurine and Zebu.

- Anugak
- Raya Azebo
- Abigar
- Afrikaner
- Aliab Dinka
- Ankole group
  - Watusi
- Drakensberger cattle
- Nguni
- Red Fulani
- Tuli
- Tswana
- White Fulani cattle
- Borgou
- Keteku
- Méré cattle
- Ghana Sanga
- Diali
- Biu
- Humpless Shorthorns

=== Zenga cattle ===
Zenga is a word coined to refer to crosses between Zebu and Sanga.

- Afar cattle
- Arado (of Ethiopia)
- Fogera (of Ethiopia)
- Horro (of Ethiopia)
- Jiddu (southern Somalia)
- Alur, also called Nioka (Nyoka) or Blukwa cattle (Democratic Republic of Congo);
- Nganda (Uganda)
- Sukuma (Tanzania)
- Tete (Mozambique)

=== Composite breeds ===
In addition to the traditional breeds outlined, African cattle have been bred with outside cattle.

- Ankole-Watusi of the United States is mostly Ankole, but some populations have Canadian contribution.
- Bonsmara of South Africa - 5/8 Afrikaner, 3/16 Hereford, 3/16 Shorthorn)
- Rana of Madagascar
- Renitelo of Madagascar
- Mpwapwa of Tanzania
