= Fulani (disambiguation) =

Fulani may refer to:

- pertaining to the Fulani Empire
- pertaining to the Fulani War
- Yasir Al-Fulani, a character from Call of Duty 4: Modern Warfare

Ethnic group and language

- Fula people (autonym Fulɓe)
  - Hausa–Fulani, a larger grouping which the Fulani belong to
- Fula language or Fulfulde language

People (proper name)

- Dan Fulani, nom de plume used by John Hare as a Nigerian author
- Lenora Fulani, an American psychologist, psychotherapist, and political activist.

Fulani cattle

- Red Fulani
- White Fulani

== See also ==
- Fula (disambiguation)
- Fula jihads
- Fulani Caliph
- A placeholder name in Arabic
