= Ankole-Watusi =

American breed of cattle

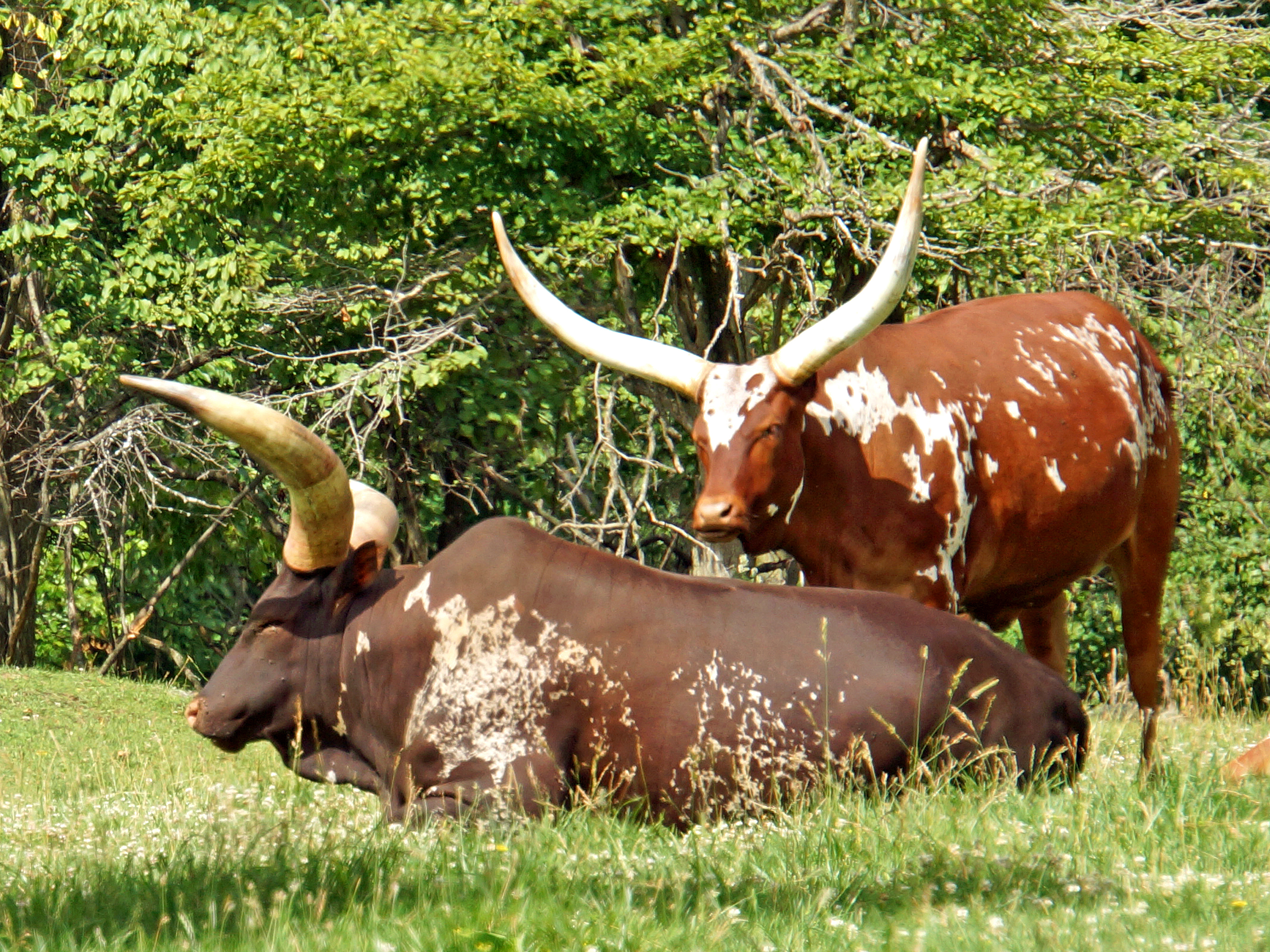
- In a safari park near Cambridge, Ontario, in Canada
- Conservation status: FAO (2007): not listed; Livestock Conservancy (2025): recovering; DAD-IS (2026): at risk
- Country of origin: United States of America
- Distribution: North America

Traits
- Weight: Male: 450–730 kg; average 590 kg; Female: 410–550 kg; average 476 kg
- Coat: usually red
- Horn status: horned, large thick horns
- Cattle; Hybrid Bos (primigenius) taurus/indicus

The Ankole-Watusi is a modern American breed of domestic cattle. It derives from the Ankole group of Sanga cattle breeds of east and central Africa. It is characterized by very large horns. Similar cattle in European zoos, called Watusi, are a strain of the African Ankole.

== History ==
The Ankole-Watusi derives from cattle of the Ankole group of Sanga cattle breeds of east and central Africa. Some of these were brought to Germany as zoo specimens in the early twentieth century, and from there they spread to other European zoos. Some were imported to the United States, and in 1960 a herd was started in New York State by cross-breeding some of them with an unrelated Canadian bull. A breed society, the Ankole Watusi International Registry, was set up in 1983, and in 1989 a breed standard was drawn up.

The total number of purebred animals was estimated in 1984 at 120 head; in 2016 the total population was thought to be approximately 1500 head, some 80% of them in the United States. In 2025 the conservation status of the breed was listed in DAD-IS as "at risk/critical maintained" – based on a population estimated at 100 to 500 for the year 2022 – while on the watchlist of the American Livestock Conservancy it was listed as "recovering".

== Characteristics ==
The coat may be of a number of different colors, but is usually red. Body weights are in the range 410 to 550 kg for cows and 450 to 730 kg for bulls. The horns are unusually large, with a wide spread and the largest circumference found in any cattle breed. Guinness World Records lists a bull named CT Woodie with a horn circumference of 103.5 cm (40.7 in) and a steer named Lurch, with horns measuring 95.25 cm (37.50 in), as record-holders.

First parturition in heifers is usually at about 24 months. Calves weigh some 15 to 25 kg at birth.

At the Houston Zoo

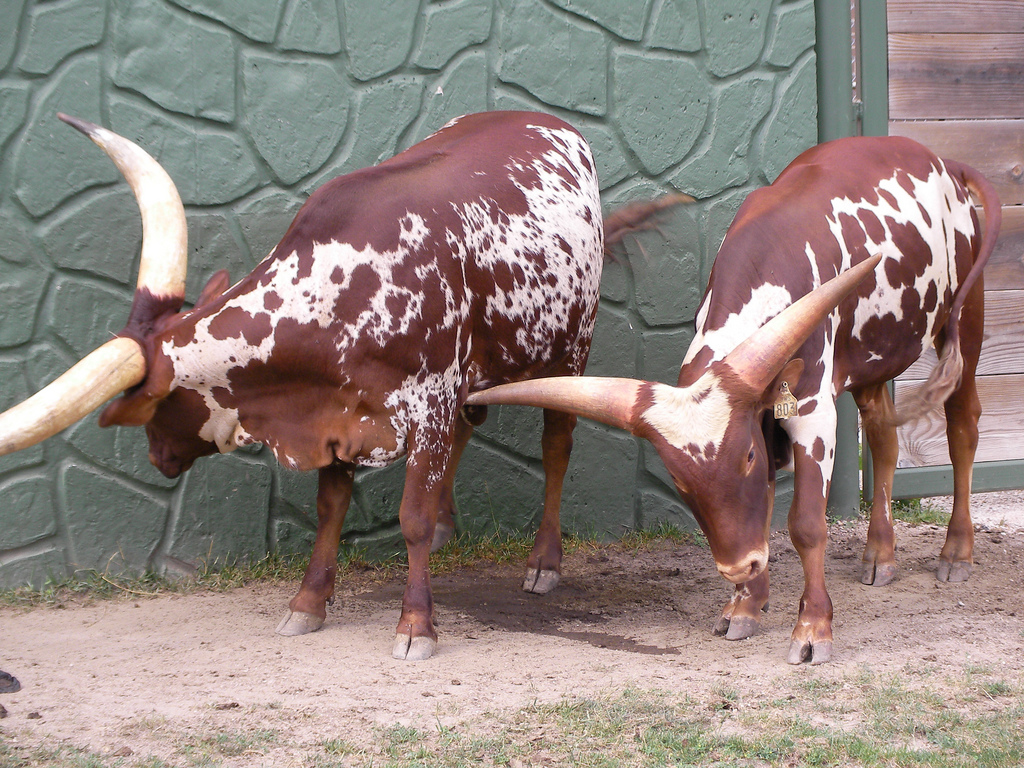
In Racine Zoo in Wisconsin

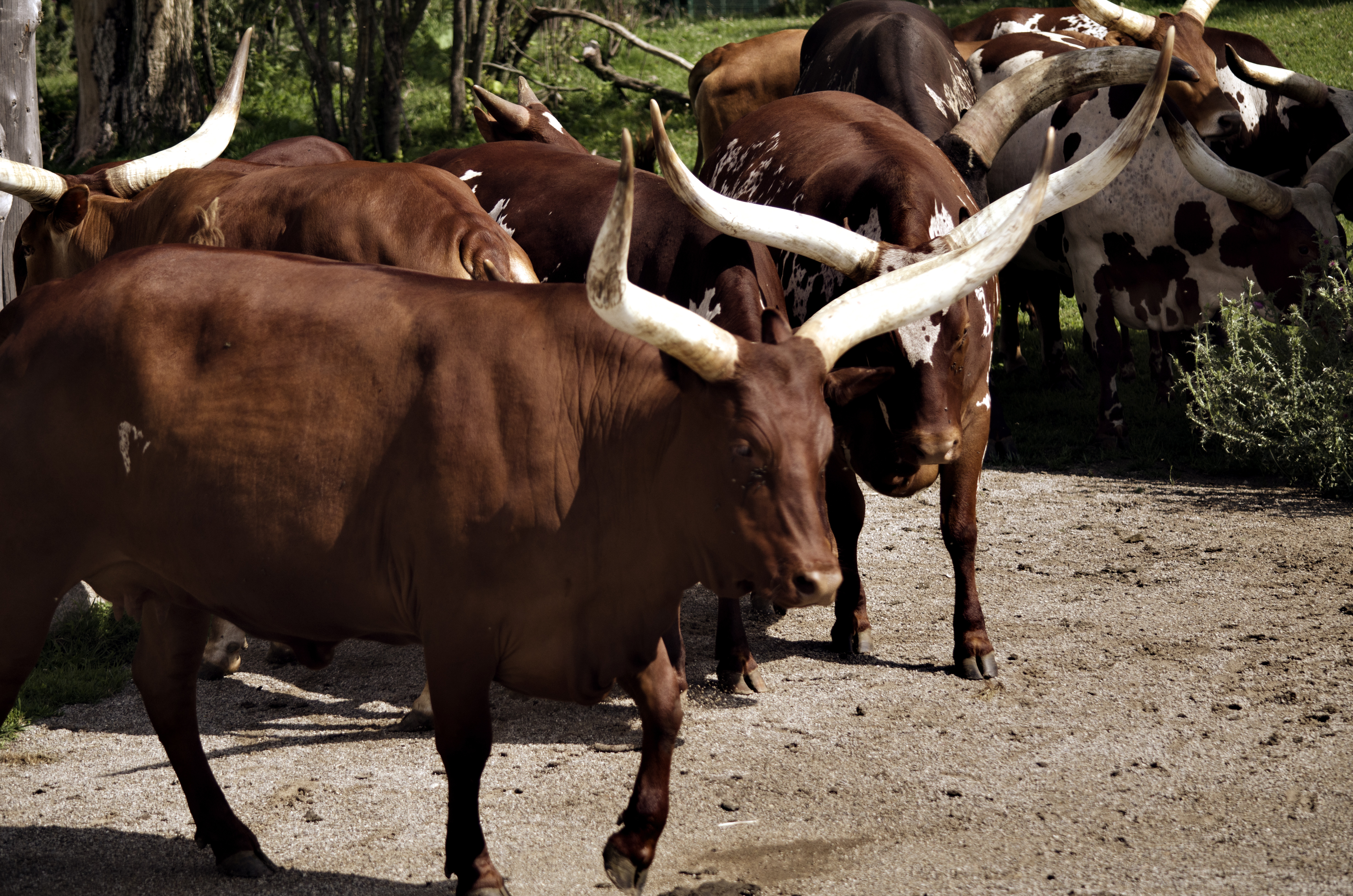
In African Lion Safari, in Hamilton, Ontario
