= Tuli cattle =

Breed of cattle

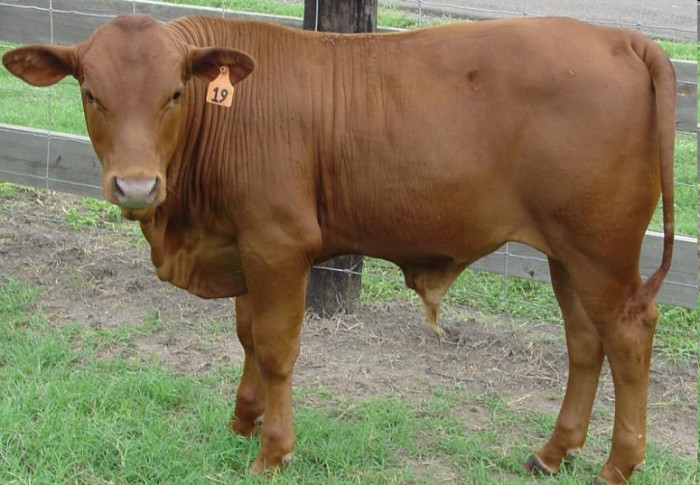
Tuli Crossbred Bull Calf

Tuli is a beef cattle breed that originated from Zimbabwe. It is a form of Sanga cattle closely related to the Tswana breed from Botswana. Tuli cattle have a small thoraco-cervical hump and are uni-coloured: yellow, golden-brown or red. It has been exported to Argentina, Mexico and the United States. In South Africa a composite of Tuli and Limousin cattle has recently been developed, named Tulim cattle. When Australia decided to import the breed, it used embryo transfer in order to limit the possible transfer of African cattle diseases and parasites.

The Tuli breed was founded by the Rhodesian Government at a Government station situated on the Banks of the Tuli River. The purpose was to establish an indigenous breed suited to the prevailing hot dry conditions. The person charged with the task of establishing this was Len Harvey, a member of the Department of Conservation and Extension under the auspice of the Ministry Of Agriculture. It was originally established in 1949/50. The Tuli Breeding Station was purpose built and was later to also serve as a government administration center. Len Harvey attended all of the local cattle sales and selected the animals he fancied that would prove to be good foundation stock.

The Tswana breed had been developed over the centuries to suit the arid environment. They were docile, productive and highly fertile. These traits were preserved in the Tuli breed. Cattle were originally distributed from the research station to local African farmers, but white farmers soon became interested in the breed which afterwards became very popular.
