= Tswana cattle =

Tswana breed of cattle

Tswana
- Conservation status: FAO (2007): not listed; DAD-IS (2023): unknown
- Other names: Bechuana; Botswana; Sechuana; Setswana
- Country of origin: Botswana
- Distribution: Botswana, South Africa
- Use: beef

Traits
- Coat: solid red or black, red pied, black pied

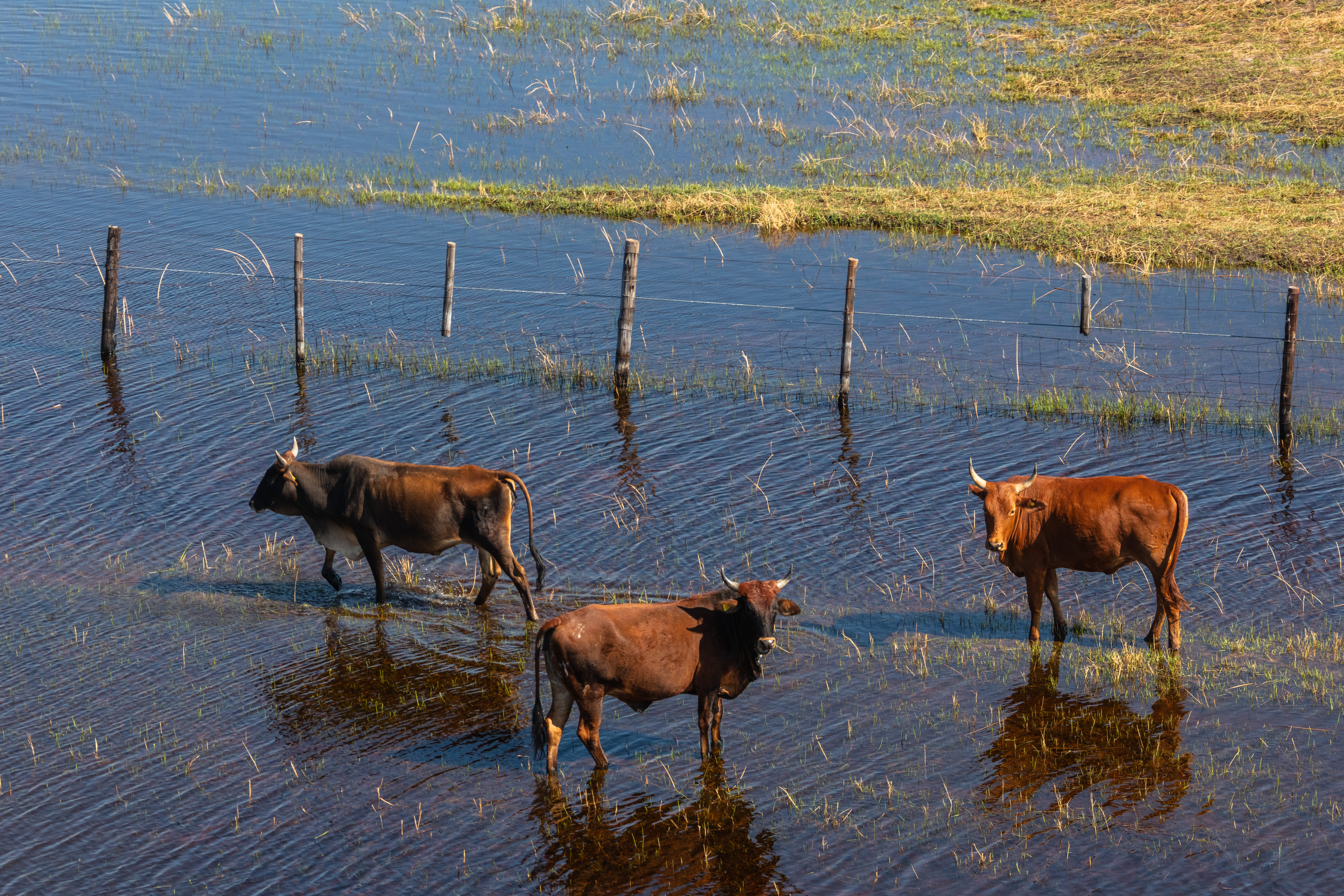
Cattle in the Okavango Delta of Botswana

The Tswana is an indigenous breed or group of breeds of beef cattle of Botswana. It is a Sanga type, similar to Barotse and Tuli. The coat colour may be solid red or black, red pied or – less frequently – black pied. It is also present in South Africa. Animals of this breed are well adapted to hot, dry environments and have a high level of tick and heat tolerance.
