= Abigar =

Breed of cattle

Abigar are a breed of cattle found in Eastern Africa. They are classified as Sanga cattle. Although primarily dairy cattle, they are also slaughtered for their beef.

Cows produce approximately 750 kg of milk per lactation. The origin of Abigar cattle breed is found to be Gambella Regional State, especially the districts occupied by the Nuer people. The observed production & reproduction performance of the breed is promising under the prevailing stressful and challenging environment in the region. The Abigar cattle is said to be hardy animals in response to frequent disease outbreaks, drought and seasonal feed and water shortages and high temperature and heat loads. However, a gradually decreasing trend of Abigar cattle was reported in the study areas. Frequent disease outbreaks coupled with lack of veterinary service, lack of security, flood, cattle raiders, recurrent drought, rangeland degradation, illegal cattle marketing, seasonal feed and water shortages and lack of extension service were among the identified threats to the decreasing trend of the Abigar cattle in the study areas.
