= Tulim =

Breed of cattle

Tulim is a recently developed beef cattle breed, a composite of Tuli and Limousin cattle. Their origin and major distribution is in South Africa.
