= Fula =

Fula may refer to:

- Fula people (or Fulani, Fulɓe)
- Fula language (or Pulaar, Fulfulde, Fulani)
  - The Fula variety known as the Pulaar language
  - The Fula variety known as the Pular language
  - The Fula variety known as Maasina Fulfulde
- Fula alphabets writing systems of Fula language in the Latin script.
- Al-Fula
- Fula jihads series of Jihads across West Africa during the 18th and 19th centuries
