= Bir Kiseiba =

Archaeological site in Egypt

- Site of Bir Kiseiba
- 22.683333°N 29.916667°E
- Location: Egypt

Bir Kiseiba is a Neolithic archaeological site in Egypt, dating from approximately 11,000–5,000 BP, that lies approximately 250 km west of the Nile in Lower Nubia. Excavated by Fred Wendorf, Romauld Schild, and Angela Close, Bir Kiseiba, along with Nabta Playa, has some of the earliest evidence for food production, permanent settlement, and more diverse technologies as compared to sites from the Late Pleistocene. Wendorf and associates argue that cattle and pottery were here as early as any other place in Africa, although this assertion has been challenged.

== Archaeology ==
Most of the studies in the Bir Kiseiba region relate to the beginning of the Holocene when there was a wet period from about 11–10,000 BP until 5000 BP. There were two digging seasons at Bir Kiseiba, one in 1979 and the second in 1980. A total of 13 localities were excavated, scattered among four dry lakes or playas in the Bir Kiseiba region.

Occupations from throughout the Early Holocene were studied; however, the most emphasis was put on earlier sites occupied before 6500 BP due to limited resources, the locations of many later sites along the margins of the basins, previous studies had already been done at the later sites, and only the earlier sites could provide data related to the appearance of cattle to the Sahara. The earliest known settlements in the area have been radiocarbon dated to between 9800 and 8900 BP. Artifacts from these settlements yielded the remains of cattle and also sherds of pottery with designs distantly related to the Early Khartoum styles.

=== Faunal Remains ===
Many faunal remains were found at each site and include turtles, lizards, frogs, birds, desert hedgehogs, hares, lesser gerbils, striped ground squirrels, elephants, dorcas gazelle, and large bovids that Wendorf and colleagues believed to be domestic cattle.

The bovid remains were of particular interest. Taking into account the context in which these remains were found, the remains could be from wild cattle (Bos primigenius), domestic cattle (B. primigenius f. taurus), African buffalo (Syncerus caffer), or a giant buffalo species belonging to the genus Pelorovis. Unfortunately the specimens at Bir Kiseiba were not well preserved enough for comparative analysis. However, by referring to the size of the found remains, it is unlikely that the material comes from giant buffalo. The measurements do suggest that these animals were at least as large as wild cattle, but there is not enough information of the sexual dimorphism in size of these animals. Overall the size range of the bovid remains includes large domestic cattle and smaller wild cattle.

=== Pottery ===
During the Late Neolithic period (ca. 5100–4700 BCE), smooth ceramic ware appeared at Bir Kiseiba, some of which was black-topped, similar to the characteristic ware of the early Predynastic period in the Nile Valley.

Approximately 300 ceramic sherds were found at the sites at Bir Kiseiba. There were no whole or reconstructable vessels found at any site. The surface colors of the sherds ranged from reds, to dark reds, to yellow-reds, yellow-browns, dark browns, and gray-browns. The core colors varied from reds, red-browns, dark browns, and very dark gray-browns. The colors of the ceramics suggest that they were fired in oxidizing atmospheres. Most of the vessels seem to have been constructed using a coiling technique and many were decorated with various motifs, the most common being the Woven Mat motif. The assemblages found at Bir Kiseiba are very similar to the Middle Neolithic assemblages found at Nabta Playa, and both fall within the Khartoum Horizon Style of ceramics.

There were 3 different techniques used to decorate the ceramics: impression, incision, and punctation. Impression was the most common, being used to produce several motifs. The most common motif consists of continuous impressions made with a square or rectangular-toothed comb, or possibly the serrated edge of a shell. This results in a motif that looks similar to basketry and is fittingly called Woven Mat.

=== Settlements ===
There are not enough data to make definitive statements about the early settlements that may have existed in the Bir Kiseiba region; however, Wendorf and colleagues do point out some observations:

The earliest Holocene settlement sites are currently thought to be temporary camps only occupied in the time after the region's summer rains but before the periods of aridity. This is when there would be enough vegetation available for grazing populations, such as cattle and gazelles. The consistency of cattle bones points toward these small sites being temporary herding camps, where small groups of people would let their cattle graze and possibly hunt the other grazing animals found in the area, such as gazelles and hares.

== Controversy ==
Twenty two cattle bones were found in the Nabta Playa / Bir Kiseiba area. Excavators argue that these bones are from domesticated cattle, basing their claims on the reconstruction of the ecology showing conditions that were too poor to support large animals without human intervention, forming the basis of the Wendorf-Schild Model. Others have countered that an environment capable of sustaining gazelles and hares would have enough vegetation to support large animals like rhino and elephant, thus being able to support wild cattle as well. There is also no known ecological zone that contains only hares and gazelle, which suggests that faunal records of the area are fragmentary and incomplete.

Measurements of the bones from Nabta Playa and Bir Kiseiba morphologically have fallen within the range of aurochs.

Mitochondrial DNA has also done little to support the Wendorf-Schild Model beyond showing that the wild Bos primigenius could be the primary source for early domesticated cattle.
