= White Fulani =

Breed of cattle

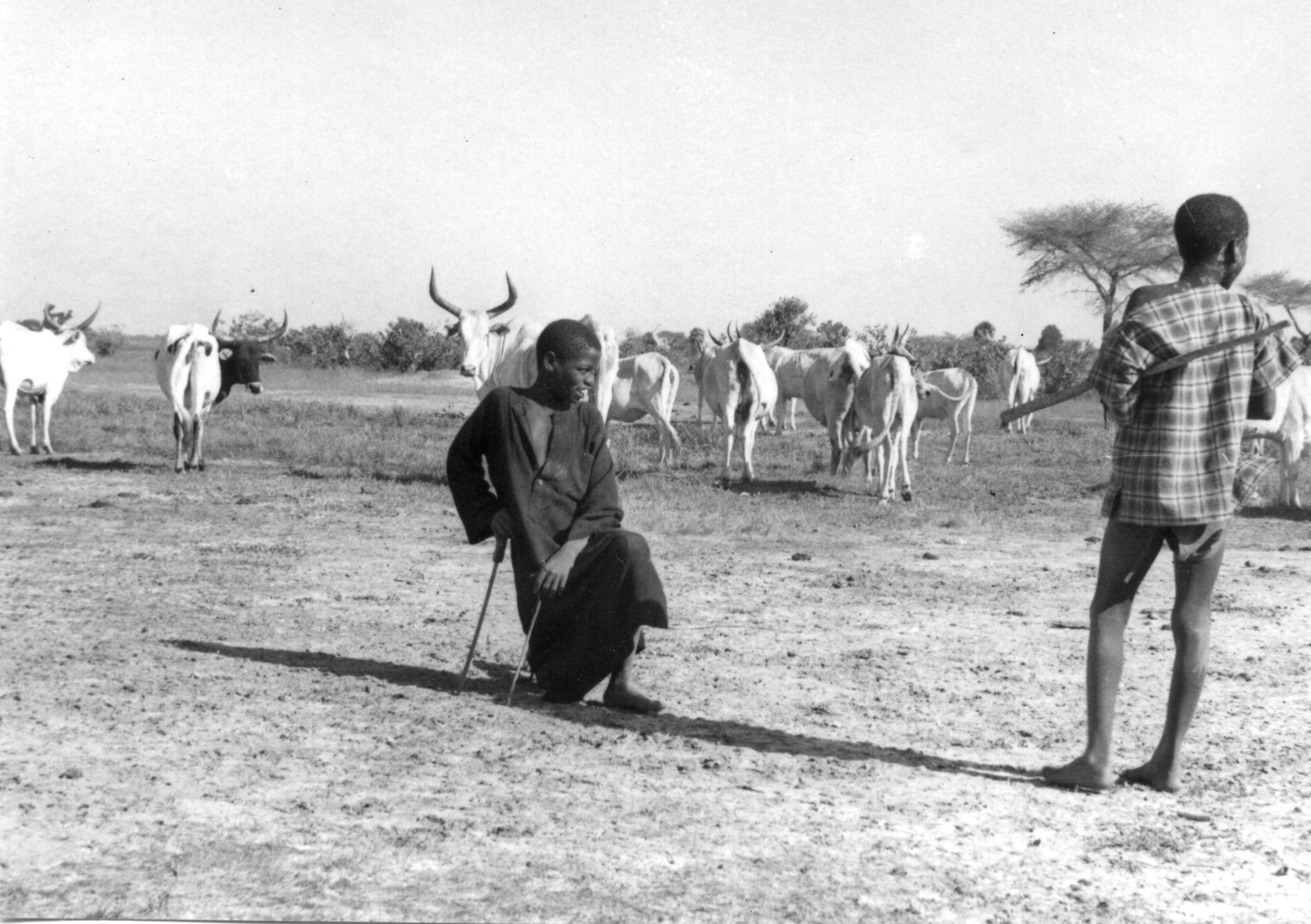
Fula cattle herders in 1967

White Fulani cattle are an important beef breed of cattle found across the regions inhabited by the Fulani people and beyond in the Sahel zone of Africa. Although primarily Zebu, they originate from the Sanga cattle lineage. Characterized by high lyre shaped horns, they have either thoracic humps like the Zebu or humps intermediate with the cervico-thoracic humps of the Sanga.

The White Fulani and Red Fulani are distinct breeds, differing in both origin and in the regions where they are raised.
