= Ankole (cattle) =

African breed of cattle

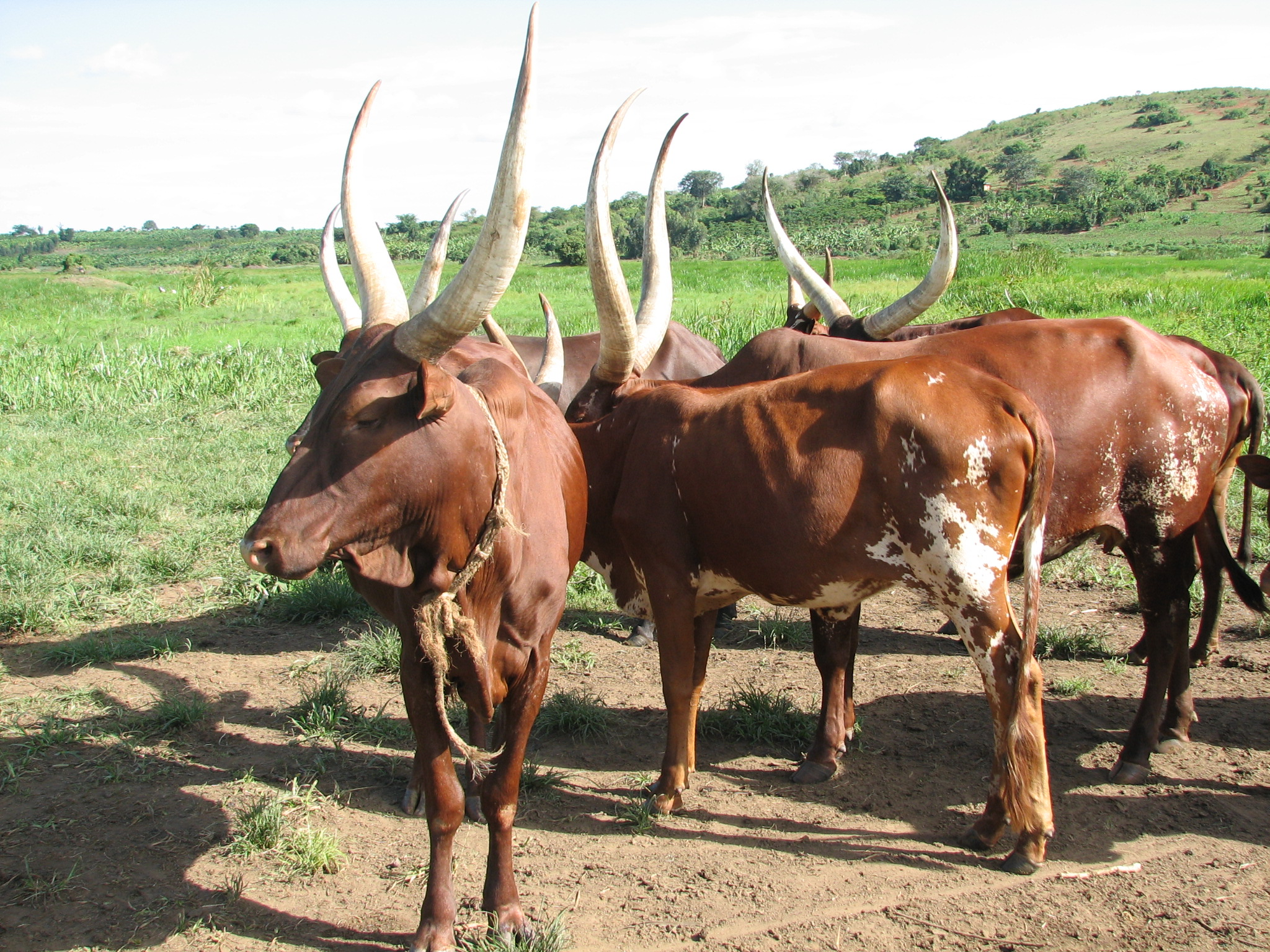
- In Umutara province in Rwanda
- Other names: Bahima; Bashi; Inkuku; Inyambo; Kigezi; Ruzizi; Toro; Watusi
- Country of origin: Burundi; Congo; Rwanda; Tanzania; Uganda
- Distribution: Central Africa
- Cattle; Bos (primigenius) taurus

The Ankole is a breed or group of breeds of African cattle, belonging to the broad Sanga cattle grouping of African breeds. The Ankole is distributed in much of eastern and central Africa, particularly in Uganda, the Democratic Republic of the Congo, Rwanda, Burundi and parts of Tanzania.. The breed was probably introduced to the region between five and seven hundred years ago by nomadic pastoralists from more northerly parts of the continent. There are at least five distinct regional strains, some of which may be reported as breeds in their own right. These include:

- the Bahima, found in Uganda and the Congo, associated with the Bahima and other peoples;
- the Bashi in the Congo;
- the Kigezi, kept by Bakiga people in the former Kigezi District of south-western Uganda
- the Ruzizi, from the Ruzizi Valley between Lake Kivu and Lake Tanganyika
- the Watusi, found in Burundi, Congo, Rwanda, Uganda and parts of Tanzania, associated with Watusi or Tutsi people in those areas. Two small herds of the Inyambo strain of Watusi are kept in Rwanda; it is not clear if or how these are related to the royal herd of Inyambo cattle reportedly confiscated and auctioned off in 1964.

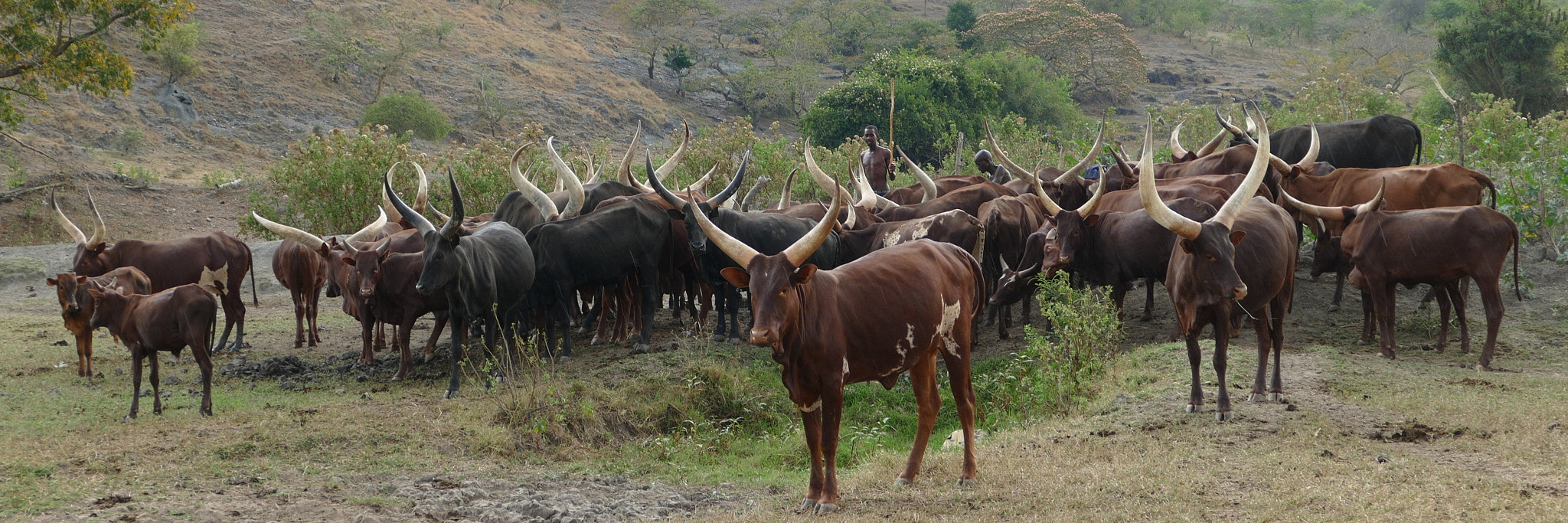

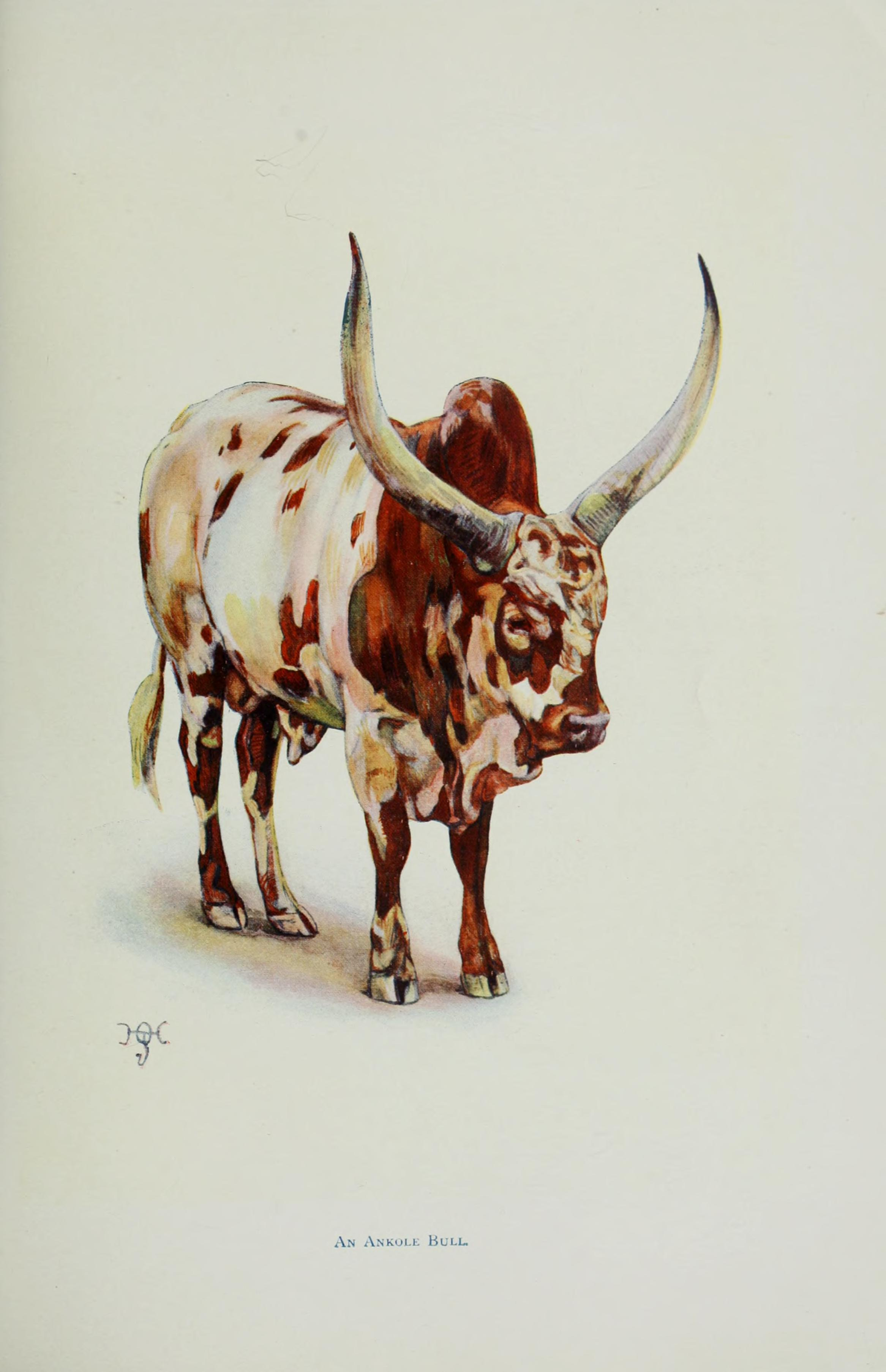
Ankole bull, 1902

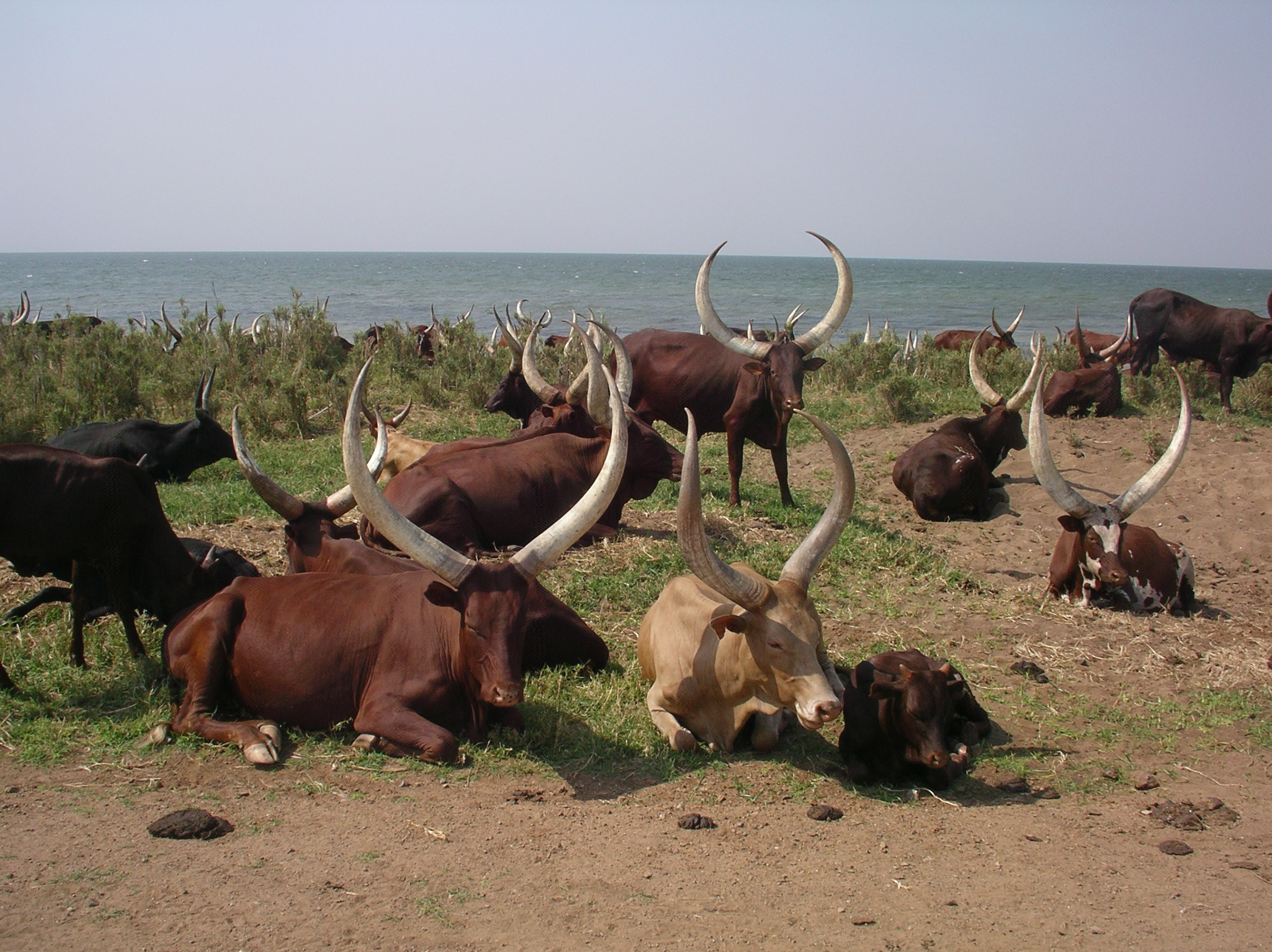
Watusi in Uganda

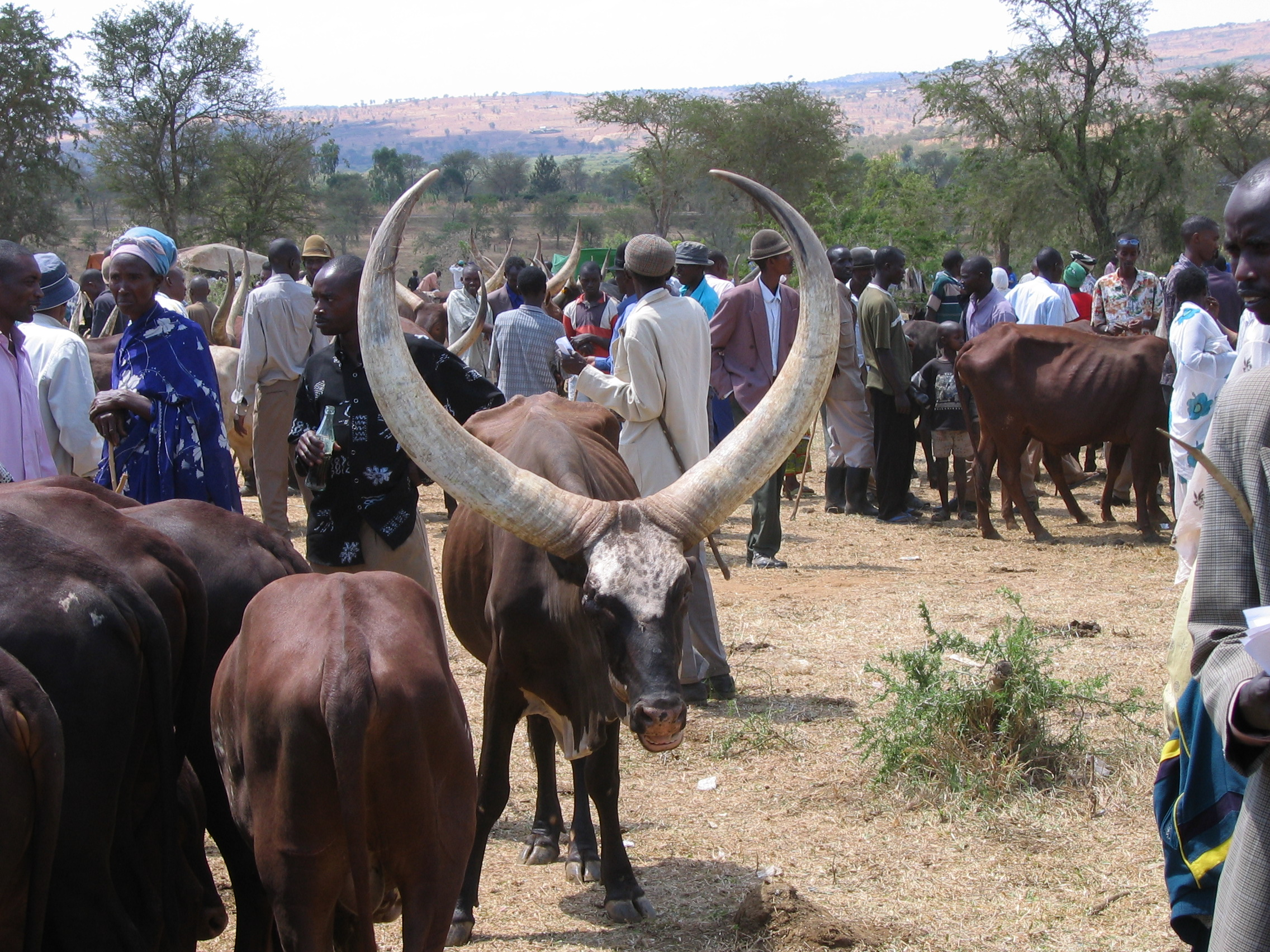
In Rwanda
