= Nabta Playa =

Region of archaeological sites in the Nubian Desert

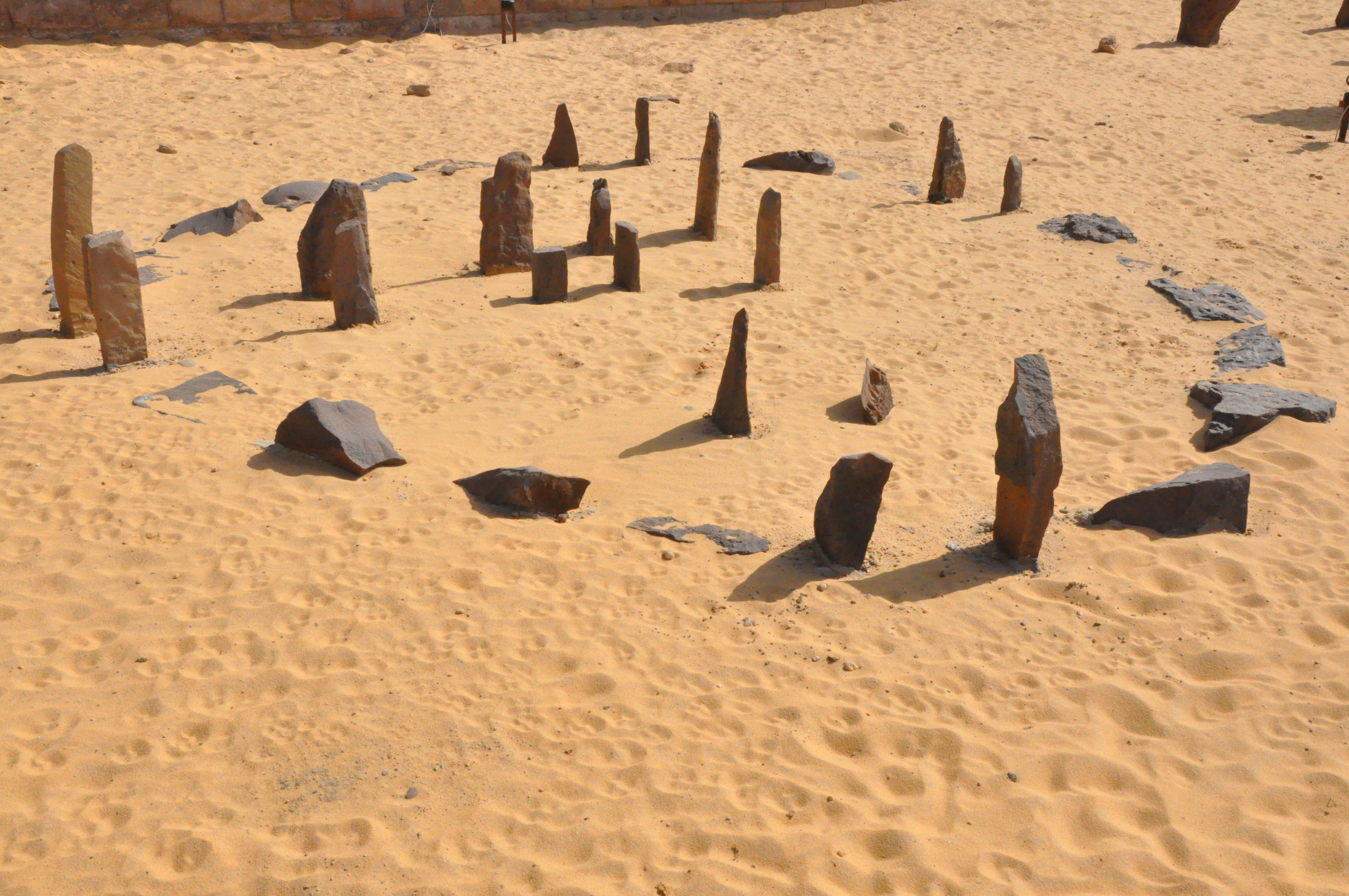
- Nabta Playa "calendar circle" (circa 4000 BC), reconstructed at Aswan Nubia museum

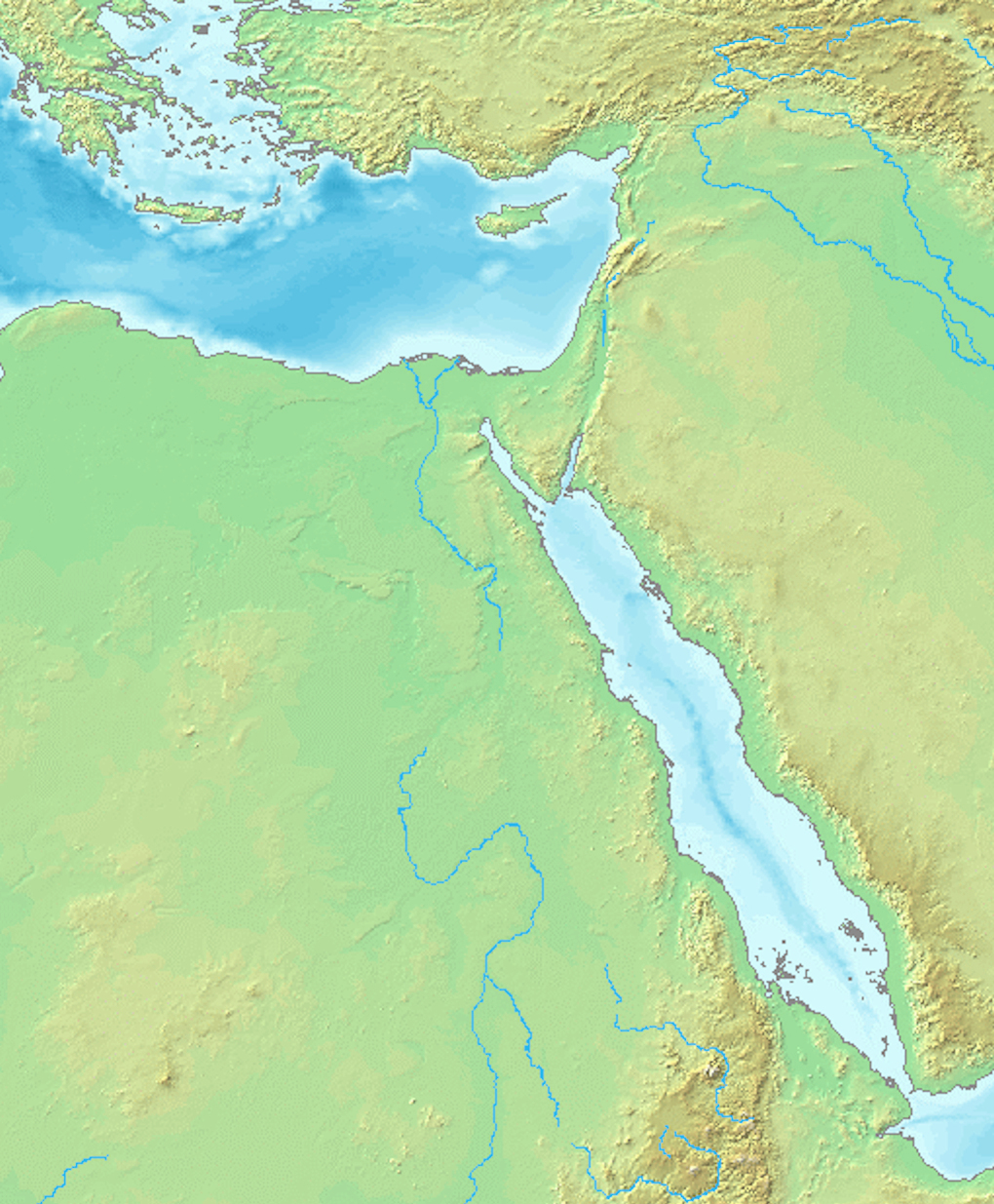
- Location within Northeast Africa Location within Egypt
- Interactive map of Nabta Playa
- 22.507967°N 30.725600°E
- Type: Settlement
- Periods: Neolithic
- Location: Egypt

History
- Built: Approximately 7500 BC

Nabta Playa was once a large endorheic basin (a temporary lake, or "playa") in the Nubian Desert, located approximately 800 kilometers south of modern-day Cairo or about 100 kilometers west of Abu Simbel in southern Egypt, 22.51° north, 30.73° east. Today the region is characterized by numerous archaeological sites. The Nabta Playa archaeological site, one of the earliest of the Nubian Neolithic Period, is dated to circa 7500 BC.

== Early history ==
Although today the western Egyptian desert is totally dry, this was not always the case. There is good evidence that there were several humid periods in the past (when up to 500 mm of rain would fall per year), including during the last interglacial and early last glaciation periods which stretched between 130,000 and 70,000 years ago, with the most recent one being the African humid period from around 15,000 to 6,000 years ago. During these times, the area was a savanna and supported numerous animals such as extinct buffalo and large giraffes, varieties of antelope and gazelle. Beginning around the 10th millennium BC, this region of the Nubian Desert began to receive more rainfall, filling a lake. Early people may have been attracted to the region due to the source of water.

Archaeological findings indicate the presence of small seasonal camps in the region dating to the 9th–8th millennia BC. Fred Wendorf, the site's discoverer, and ethno-linguist Christopher Ehret have suggested that the people who occupied this region at that time may have been early pastoralists, or like the Saami practiced semi-pastoralism. This is disputed by other sources as the cattle remains found at Nabta have been shown to be morphologically wild in several studies, and hunter-gatherers at the nearby Saharan site of Uan Afada in Libya were penning wild Barbary sheep, an animal that was never domesticated. According to Michael Brass (2018) early cattle remains from Nabta Playa were wild hunted aurochs, whilst domesticated cattle were introduced to northeast Africa in the late 7th millennium BC, originating from cattle domesticated in the Euphrates valley.

Larger settlements began to appear at Nabta Playa by the 7th millennium BC, relying on deep wells for sources of water. Small huts were constructed in straight rows. Sustenance included wild plants, such as legumes, millets, sorghum, tubers, and fruit. Around 6800 BC they began to make pottery locally. In the late 7th millennium BC goats and sheep, apparently imported from Western Asia, appear. Many large hearths also appear.

Early pottery from the Nabta Playa-Bir Kiseiba area has characteristics unlike pottery from surrounding regions. This is followed by pottery with characteristics found only in the Western Desert. Later pottery from c. 5500 BC (Al Jerar phase) has similarities with pottery from the Sudanese region. Pottery decorations included complex patterns of impressions applied with a comb in a rocking motion.

Some researchers, including Christopher Ehret, have suggested a Nilo-Saharan linguistic affinity for the Nabta people. In a more recent publication, Ehret argued that the material cultural indicators correspond with the conclusion that the inhabitants of the wider Nabta Playa region were a Nilo-Saharan-speaking population.

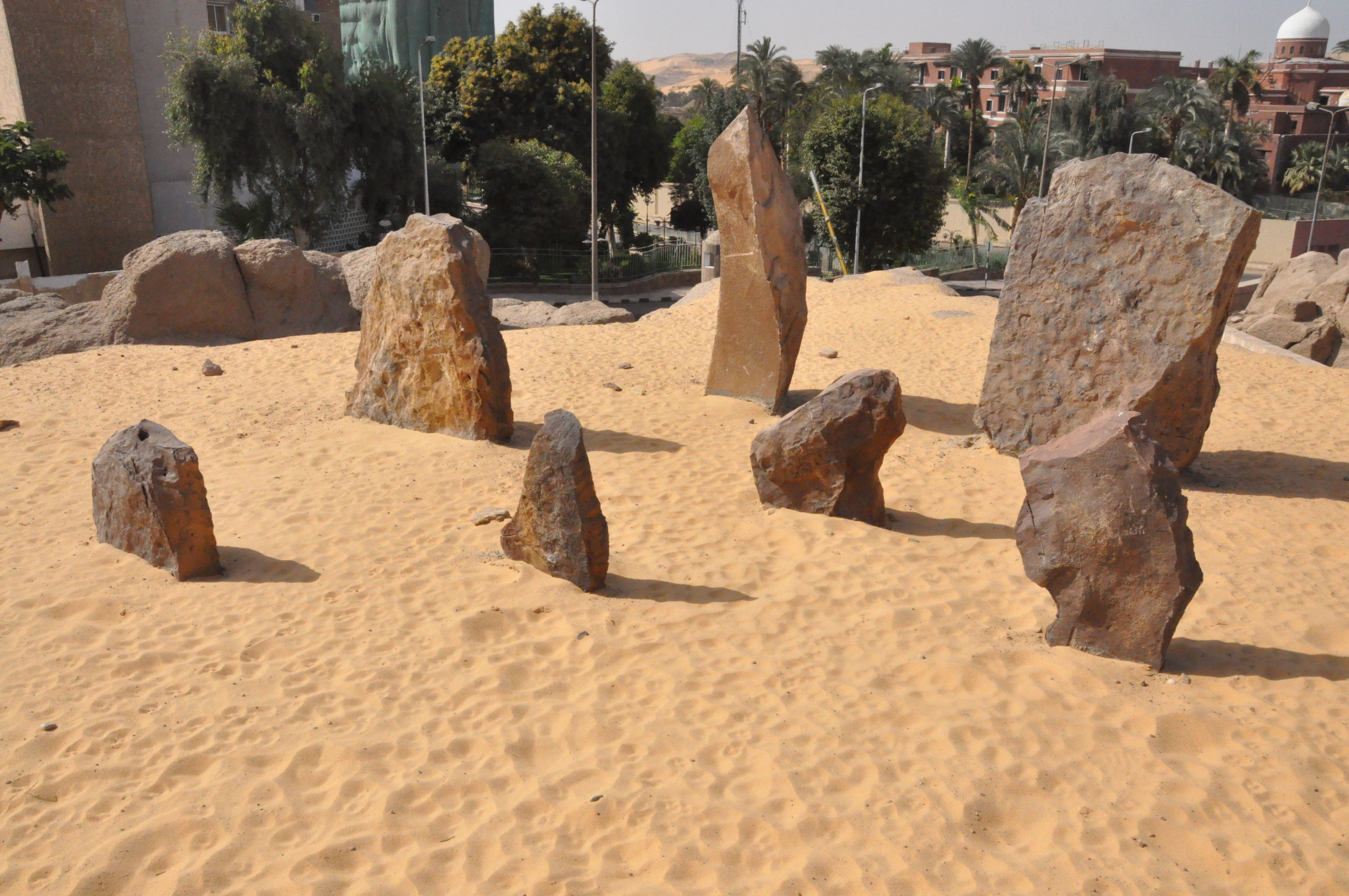
Megaliths from Nabta Playa, reconstructed at the Nubian Museum, Aswan

Egyptian historian H. A. A. Ibrahim examined the megalithic complex of Nabta Playa, Upper Egypt to understand the cultural and population influences of the Holocene on pre-dynastic Egypt. She cited an anthropological study confirming the appearance of a Sub-Saharan high status child in a ceremonial center and concluded that the megalithic structures had close resemblance to comparable structures in the Sahelian and Sub-Saharan regions of Africa.

== Organisation ==
Archaeological stages at Nabta Playa
(British Museum)

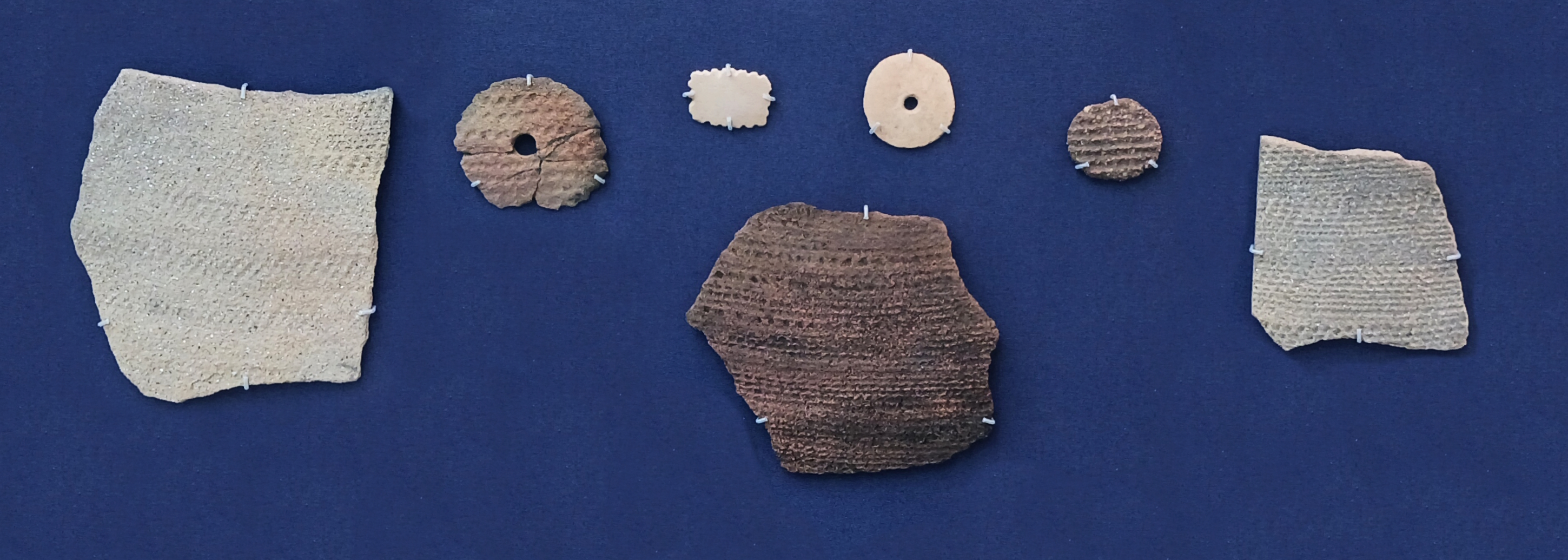
Early Neolithic (8600-7050 BC): first pottery with basket-like impressed decorations.

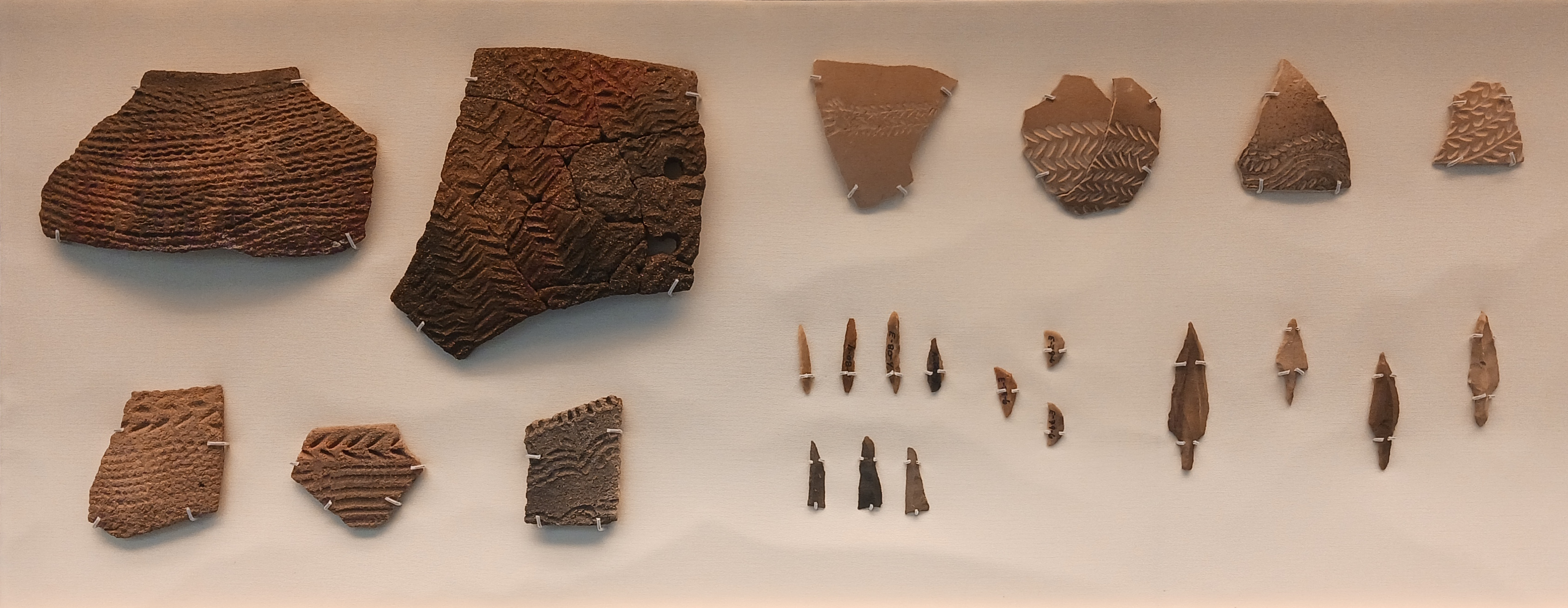
Early Neolithic (7050-6100 BC): pottery with rim patterns and Sudan-inspired wave patterns, ostrich eggshells, flint implements, arrowheads.

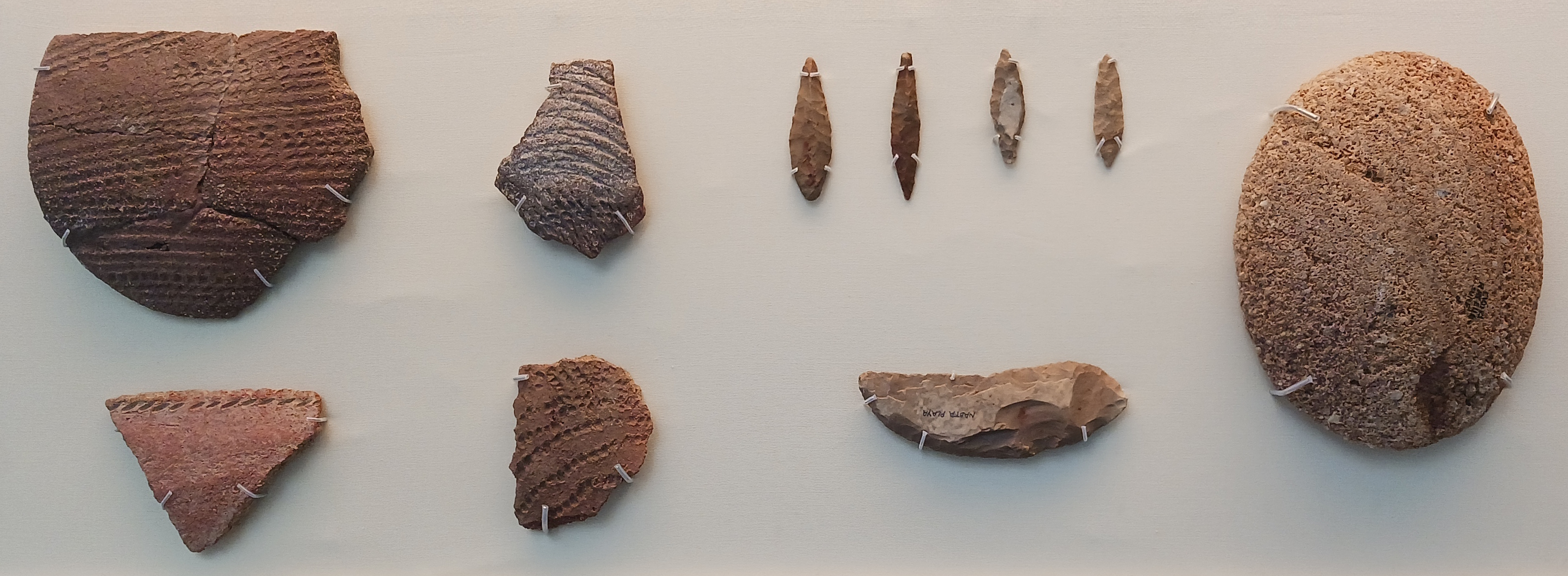
Middle Neolithic (6000-5500 BC): pottery with simpler and parse stamp designs, or smooth surface with rim decoration only, bifacial flint blades (Near Eastern technique), grinding stone for processing of cereals.

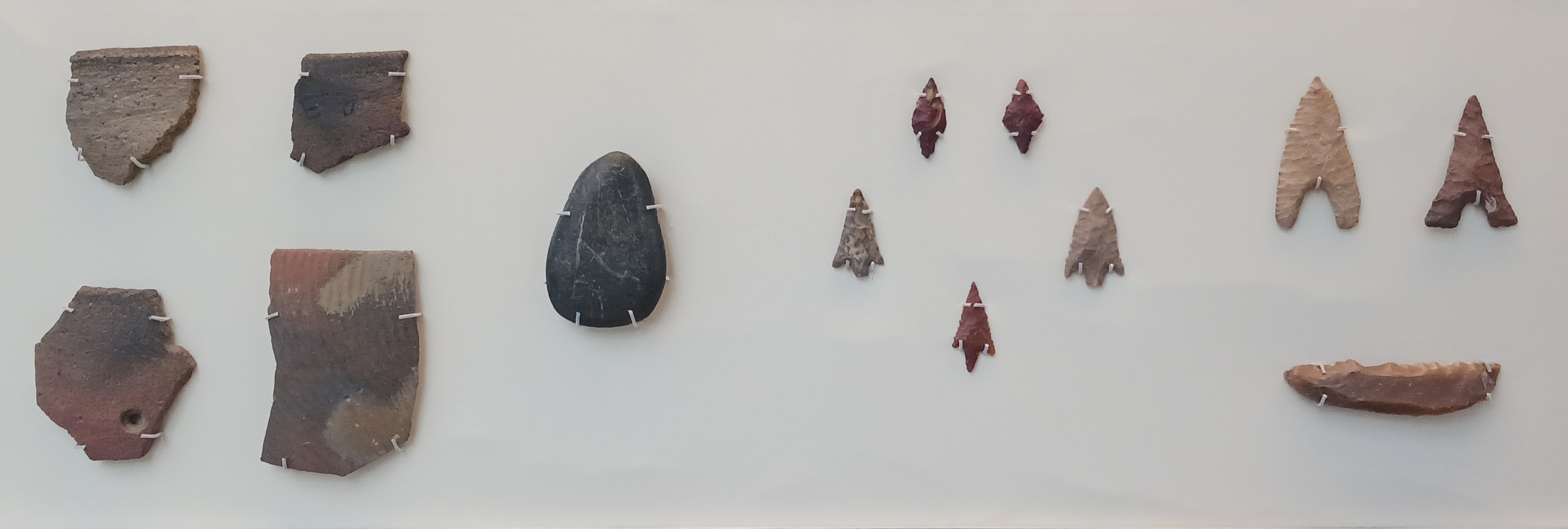
Late Neolithic (5400-4400 BC): pottery (black-rimmed or with rippled surfaces), ground stone axe, arrowheads, flint knife.

Archaeological discoveries reveal that these New Stone Age peoples seem to have lived more organized lives than their contemporaries nearer to and in the Nile Valley. The people of Nabta Playa had villages with 'planned' layouts, with deep wells that held water year-round.

Findings also indicate that the region was occupied only seasonally, most likely only in the summer, when the local lake had adequate water for grazing cattle. Comparative research suggests the indigenous inhabitants may have a significantly more advanced knowledge of astronomy than previously thought possible. This complexity as expressed by different levels of authority within the society there likely formed the basis for the structure of both the Neolithic society at Nabta and the Old Kingdom of Egypt.

== Religious ties to ancient Egypt ==
By the 6th millennium BC, evidence of a prehistoric religion or cult appears. From 5500 BC the Late Neolithic period began, with "a new group that had a complex social system expressed in a degree of organisation and control not previously seen." These new people were responsible for sacrificial cattle burials in clay-lined and roofed chambers covered by rough stone tumuli.

It has been suggested that the associated cattle cult indicated in Nabta Playa marks an early evolution of Ancient Egypt's Hathor cult. For example, Hathor was worshipped as a nighttime protector in desert regions (see Serabit el-Khadim). To directly quote professors Wendorf and Schild:

... there are many aspects of political and ceremonial life in prehistoric Egypt and the Old Kingdom that reflects a strong impact from Saharan cattle pastoralists ...

Rough megalithic stone structures buried underground are also found in Nabta Playa, one of which included evidence of what Wendorf described as perhaps "the oldest known sculpture in Egypt."

== Astronomical observation ==
In the 5th millennium BC these peoples fashioned what may be among the world's earliest known archeoastronomical devices (roughly contemporary to the Goseck circle in Germany and the Mnajdra megalithic temple complex in Malta). These include alignments of stones that may have indicated the rising of certain stars and a "calendar circle" that indicates the approximate direction of summer solstice sunrise. "Calendar circle" may be a misnomer as the spaces between the pairs of stones in the gates are a bit too wide, and the distances between the gates are too short for accurate calendar measurements." An inventory of Egyptian archaeoastronomical sites for the UNESCO World Heritage Convention evaluated Nabta Playa as having "hypothetical solar and stellar alignments."

=== Claims for early alignments and star maps ===
Astrophysicist and pseudoarchaeologist Thomas G. Brophy suggests the hypothesis that the southerly line of three stones inside the Calendar Circle represented the three stars of Orion's Belt and the other three stones inside the calendar circle represented the shoulders and head stars of Orion as they appeared in the sky. These correspondences were for two dates – circa 4800 BC and at precessional opposition – representing how the sky "moves" long term. Brophy proposes that the circle was constructed and used circa the later date, and the dual date representation was a conceptual representation of the motion of the sky over a precession cycle.

Near the Calendar Circle, which is made of smaller stones, there are alignments of large megalithic stones. The southerly lines of these megaliths, Brophy argues, aligned to the same stars as represented in the Calendar Circle, all at the same epoch, circa 6270 BC. Brophy argues that the Calendar Circle correlation with Orion's belt occurred between 6400 BC and 4900 BC, matching radio-carbon dates of some campfires in the area.

== Recent research ==
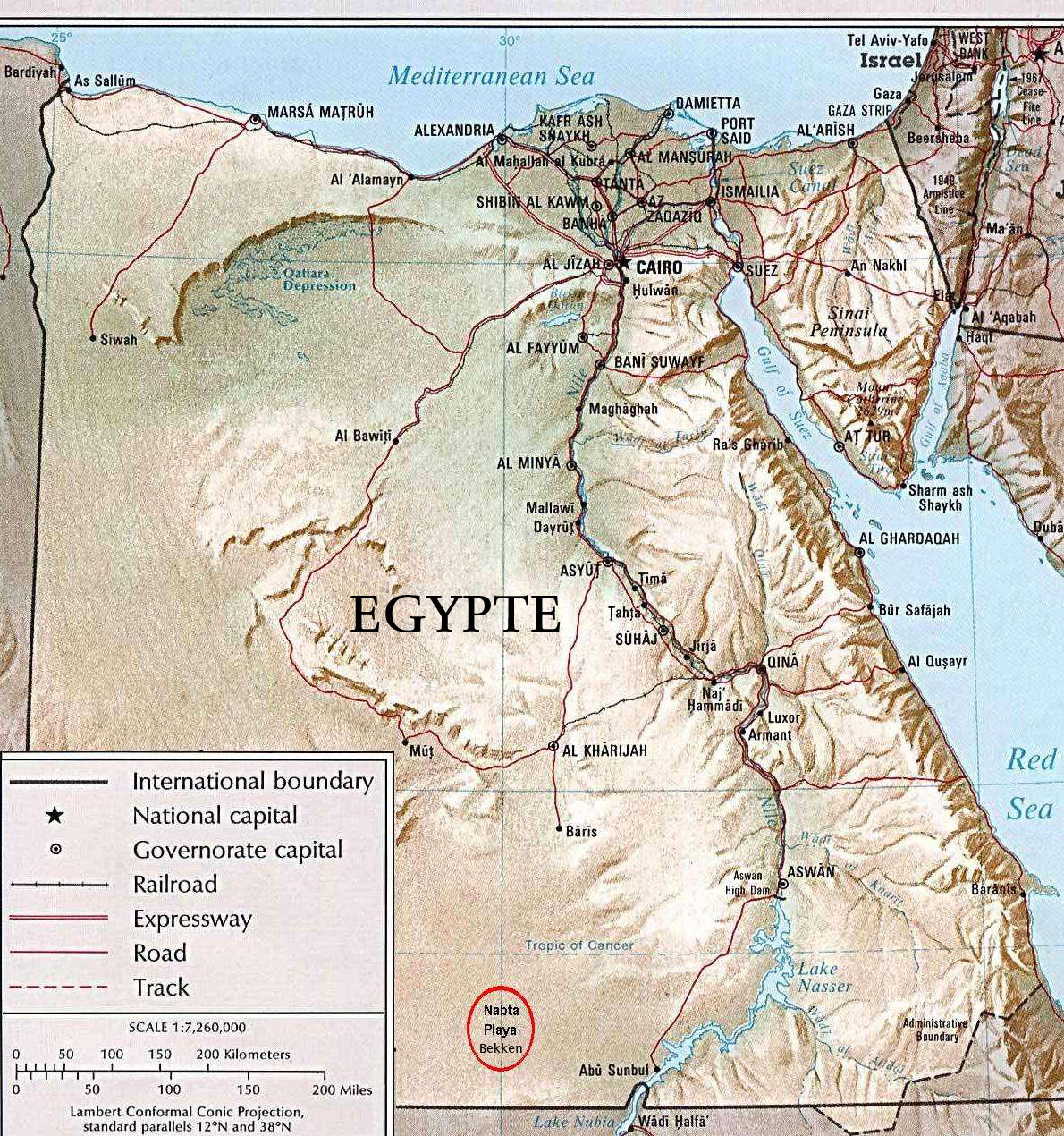
Note approximate location circled near bottom

A 2007 article by a team of University of Colorado archaeoastronomers and archaeologists (Malville, Schild, Wendorf and Brenmer, three of whom had been involved in the original discovery of the site and its astronomical alignment) responded to the work of Brophy and Rosen, in particular their claims for an alignment with Sirius in 6088 BC and other alignments which they dated to 6270 BC, saying that these dates "are about 1500 years earlier than our best estimates for the Terminal Neolithic and the construction of megalithic structures" at Nabta Playa.

The Sirius alignment in question was originally proposed by Wendorf and Malville, for one of the most prominent alignments of megaliths labelled the "C-line", which they said aligned to the rising of Sirius circa 4820 BC. Brophy and Rosen stated in 2005 that megalith orientations and star positions reported by Wendorf and Malville were in error, noting that "Given these corrected data, we see that Sirius actually aligned with the C-line circa 6000 BC. We estimate that 6088 BC Sirius had a declination of −36.51 degrees, for a rising azimuth exactly on the C-line average". However, according to Malville, Schild et al. (2007) the dates proposed by Brophy are inconsistent with the archaeological evidence, and "inference in archaeoastronomy must always be guided and informed by archaeology, especially when substantial field work has been performed in the region". They also concluded that, on closer inspection, the C-line of megaliths "consists of stones resting on the sides and tops of dunes and may not represent an original set of aligned stele".

They propose that the area was first used as what they call a "regional ceremonial centre" around 6100 BC to 5600 BC with people coming from various locations to gather on the dunes surrounding the playa where there is archaeological evidence for gatherings that involved large numbers of cattle bones, as cattle were normally only killed on important occasions. Around 5500 BC a new, more organised group began to use the site, burying cattle in clay-lined chambers and building other tumuli. Around 4800 BC a stone circle was constructed, with narrow slabs approximately aligned with the summer solstice, near the beginning of the rainy season.

More complex structures followed during a megalith period the researchers dated to between about 4500 BC to 3600 BC. Using their original measurements, complemented by satellite imagery and GPS measurements by Brophy and Rosen, they confirmed possible alignments with Sirius, Arcturus, Alpha Centauri, and the Belt of Orion. They suggest that there are three pieces of evidence suggesting astronomical observations by the herdsmen using the site, which may have functioned as a necropolis. "The repetitive orientation of megaliths, stele, human burials and cattle burials reveals a very early symbolic connection to the north." Secondly, there is the orientation of the cromlech mentioned above. The third piece of evidence is the fifth millennium alignments of stele to bright stars.

They conclude their report by writing that "The symbolism embedded in the archaeological record of Nabta Playa in the Fifth Millennium BC is very basic, focussed on issues of major practical importance to the nomads: cattle, water, death, earth, sun and stars."

In 2011, Maciej Jórdeczka, Halina Królik, Mirosław Masojć and Romuald Schild, a team of archaeologists, excavated a series of Holocene pottery from Nabta Playa which represented the earliest phase of ceramic production in the Saharan region and were described as "relatively sophisticated bowls decorated with a toothed wheel". Also, they argued that the pottery from the region had an important role in shaping the cultural development of the Eastern Sahara during the early Holocene period. The authors concluded that it is "likely that the Early Holocene colonisers of the southern Western Desert, the El Adam hunter-gatherer-cattle keepers, came to the south-eastern fringes of the Sahara from the Nile Valley" and shared an "almost identical" output of technology with the Arkinian culture in Lower Nubia.

== Physical anthropology ==
Joel D. Irish (2001), reported in "Holocene Settlement of the Egyptian Sahara", based on osteological and dental data suggested a mainly sub-Saharan African affinity and origin at Nabta (with sub-Saharan tendencies most commonly detected), but also possible North African tendencies, concluding that, "Henneberg et al. suggest that the Nabta Playa people may have been most similar to Negroes from south of the Sahara. The present qualitative dental comparison tentatively supports this conclusion.". Analysis of the dental features of skeletons from the nearby cemetery at Gebel Ramlah indicated that "two different populations, Mediterranean and sub-Saharan" were represented in the population associated with Nabta Playa.

== See also ==
- Prehistoric Egypt
- List of archaeoastronomical sites by country
- Bir Kiseiba
