= Victoria Township, Ellis County, Kansas =

Victoria Township
- Township
- Location in Ellis County
- Coordinates: 38°48′48″N 099°09′06″W
- Country: United States
- State: Kansas
- County: Ellis

Area
  - Total: 53.80 sq mi (139.35 km^{2})
  - Land: 53.80 sq mi (139.35 km^{2})
  - Water: 0 sq mi (0 km^{2}) 0%
- Elevation: 1,946 ft (593 m)

Population (2000)
  - Total: 876
  - Density: 16.3/sq mi (6.3/km^{2})
- GNIS ID: 0475298

Victoria Township was a township in Ellis County, Kansas, United States. As of the 2010 census, its population was 876. Since then, it was merged into the enlarged Herzog Township.

== Geography ==
The final plat of the Victoria Township covered an area of 53.8 square miles (139 km^{2}) and contained one incorporated settlement, Victoria. According to the USGS, it contained two cemeteries: Saint Boniface and Saint George.

Big Creek, with its tributaries Mud Creek and North Fork Big Creek, runs through this area.
