= Turkville, Kansas =

Ghost town in Ellis County, Kansas

- Ghost town
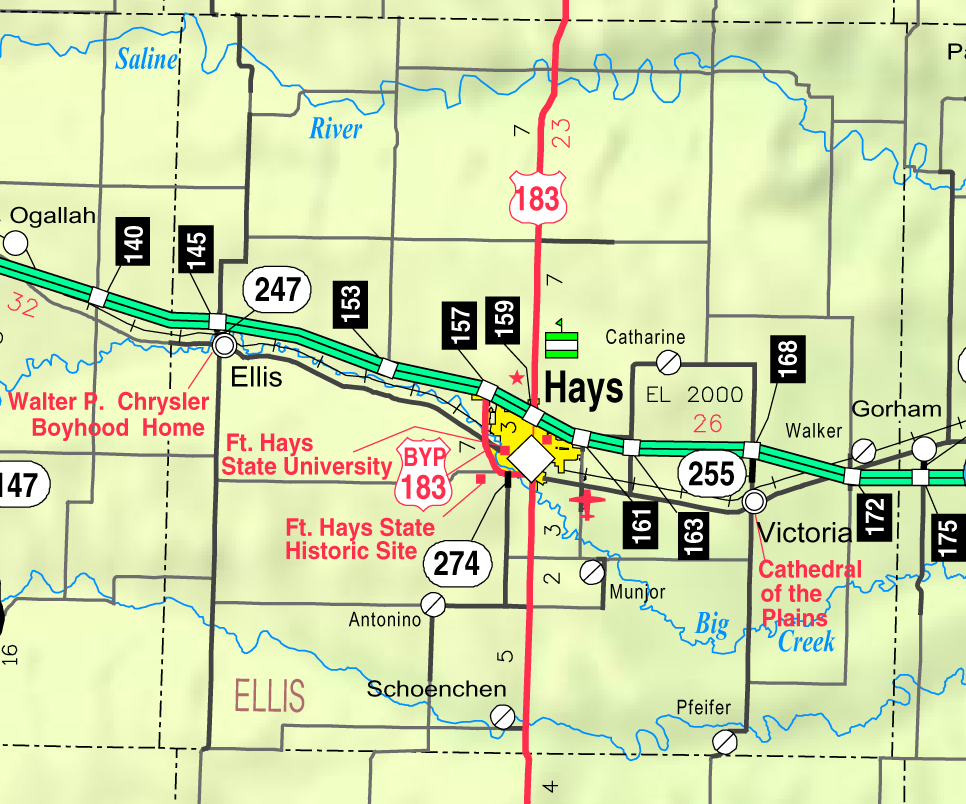
- KDOT map of Ellis County (legend)

- Location within Kansas Location within the United States
- Coordinates: 39°06′12″N 99°14′44″W
- Country: United States
- State: Kansas
- County: Ellis
- Township: Buckeye
- Founded: 1876
- Elevation: 1,837 ft (560 m)

Population
  - Total: 0
- Time zone: UTC-6 (CST)
  - Summer (DST): UTC-5 (CDT)
- ZIP Code: 67663
- Area code: 785
- FIPS code: 20-71750
- GNIS ID: 484604

Turkville is a ghost town in Buckeye Township, Ellis County, Kansas, United States. It is located approximately 14 miles north of Hays.

== History ==
Settlers from Tennessee founded Turkville in 1876. They were Baptists, and they established the first Baptist church in Ellis County. Most were the extended family of their pastor, Rev. Allen King.

Turkville was issued a post office in 1875. The post office was discontinued in 1918. The population in 1910 was 40.

== Geography ==
Turkville is located at 39°06′12″N 99°14′44″W (39.1033441, -99.2456550) at an elevation of 1,837 feet (561 m). It lies on the north bank of the Saline River in the Smoky Hills region of the Great Plains. Turkville is approximately 3 miles (4.8 km) east of U.S. Route 183 in far north-central Ellis County, roughly 16 miles (26 km) north-northeast of Hays, the county seat.

== Education ==
The Turkville elementary school was closed in 1967.

== Transportation ==
Saline River Road, an unpaved county road, runs east–west through Turkville.
