= Lookout Township, Kansas =

Lookout Township
- Township
- Location in Ellis County
- Coordinates: 38°45′43″N 099°21′56″W
- Country: United States
- State: Kansas
- County: Ellis

Area
  - Total: 122.60 sq mi (317.54 km^{2})
  - Land: 122.48 sq mi (317.21 km^{2})
  - Water: 0.13 sq mi (0.33 km^{2}) 0.1%
- Elevation: 2,028 ft (618 m)

Population (2000)
  - Total: 579
  - Density: 4.7/sq mi (1.8/km^{2})
- GNIS feature ID: 0475282

Lookout Township was a township in Ellis County, Kansas, United States. In the 2010 census, its population was 579.

== Geography ==
Lookout Township covered an area of 122.6 square miles (318 km^{2}) and contained one incorporated settlement, Schoenchen and the unincorporated settlement of Antonino. According to the USGS, it contained one cemetery, Saint Anthony, at Antonino. The township was the focus of the 1890s gold rush hoax witnessing the short lived settlements of Smoky Hill City and Chetolah.

== History ==
A post office was opened at Palatine in 1880. The post office relocated across the Smoky Hill River to Chetolah in 1888, but was discontinued in 1897. In 2023, the townships of Ellis County were redrawn. Lookout Township was absorbed by Big Creek Township and became South Big Creek within the township.
