= Basilica of St. Fidelis =

Historic church in Victoria, Kansas, United States

- St. Fidelis Catholic Church
- U.S. National Register of Historic Places
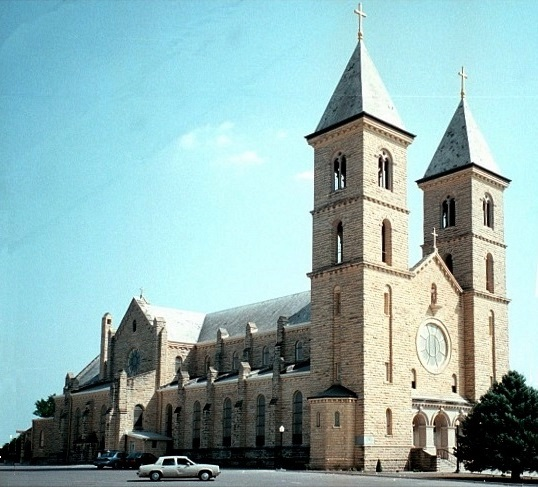
- View of the church from the northwest in 1997
- Location: Victoria, Kansas, U.S.
- Coordinates: 38°51′23″N 99°09′03″W
- Area: 3 acres (1.2 ha)
- Built: 1908–1911
- Architects: John T. Comès; Joseph Marshall
- Architectural style: Romanesque
- NRHP reference No.: 71000315
- Added to NRHP: May 14, 1971

The Basilica of St. Fidelis, commonly known as the Cathedral of the Plains or Basilica of the Plains, is a Romanesque-style Catholic parish church in Victoria, Kansas, United States.

St. Fidelis is not formally a Catholic cathedral. It is located within the Diocese of Salina, whose formal mother church is Sacred Heart Cathedral in Salina. However, St. Fidelis was formally raised to the status of a minor basilica in 2014.

== History ==
The church was built between 1908 and 1911. The architect was John T. Comès of Pittsburgh with modifications and supervision by architect Joseph Marshall of Topeka. According to the church history, each member of the church who was 12 or older was asked to give $45, haul six wagon loads of Fencepost limestone and four loads of sand each year until the church was built. Some families brought as many as 70 to 80 wagonloads of stone.

The nickname The Cathedral of the Plains was bestowed upon the structure by former presidential candidate William Jennings Bryan after he visited the town in 1912. Its 48 historic stained-glass windows were installed in 1916, by Munich Studio of Chicago, at a cost of $3,700, and are now valued at more than $1 million. The church was added to the National Register in 1971.

In 1994, the church began a series of restoration efforts. The congregation spent more than $265,000 on weatherproofing the exterior, re-plastering and repainting the interior and updating the sound, electrical and heating systems. Work also included installing a marble floor in the sanctuary for $60,000 and replacing old carpeting and linoleum floors in other areas. The parish re-shingled the church roof in 2006 for $137,000. The twin towers are 141 feet tall and are clearly visible from Interstate 70, making the basilica a major landmark in western Kansas.

In 2011, it replaced the parking lot and sidewalks for $225,000, and spent $70,000 on repairing the plaster ceilings and walls that had cracked with age. In 2013, an Arkansas company replaced plastic coverings that were installed in the mid-1980s to protect stained glass window from Kansas storms. As it aged, the plastic grew opaque, however the new coverings are tempered glass which will remain clear.

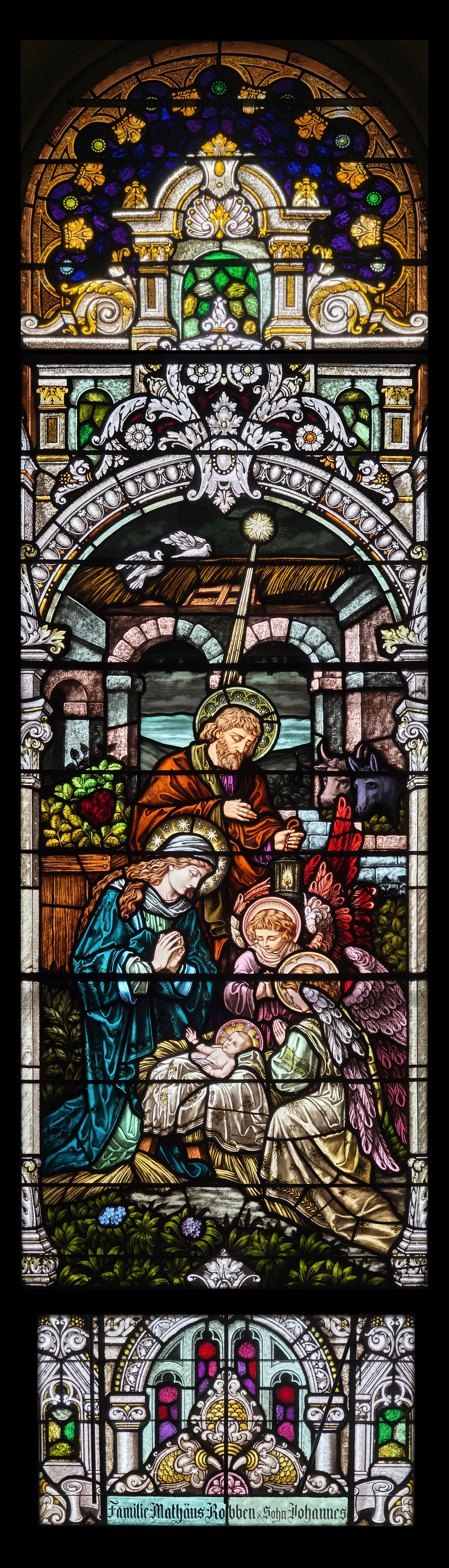
The Nativity by the Munich Studio of Chicago

After approval by the Vatican in early March 2014, Bishop Edward Weisenburger of the Diocese of Salina dedicated St. Fidelis Church as a minor basilica on Saturday, June 7, 2014.

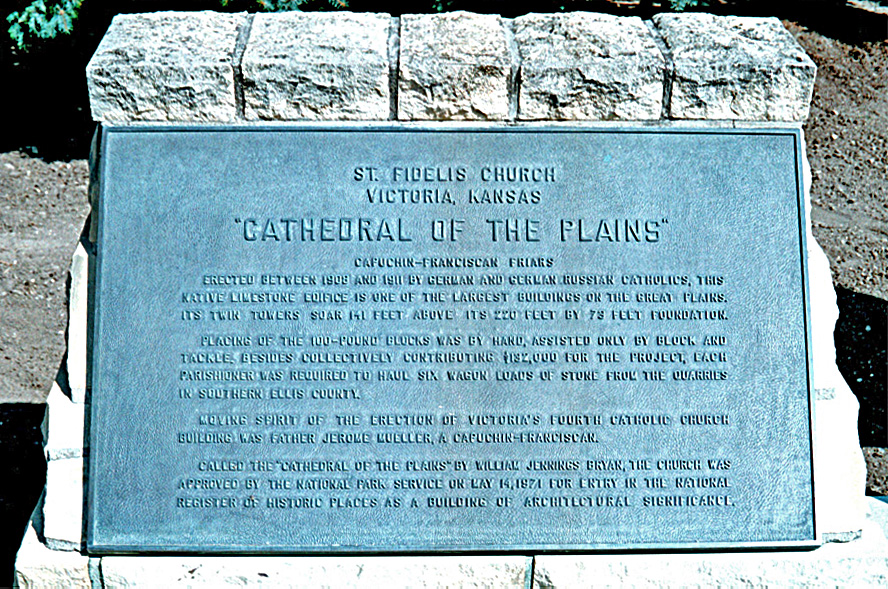
Plaque outside the church (1997)

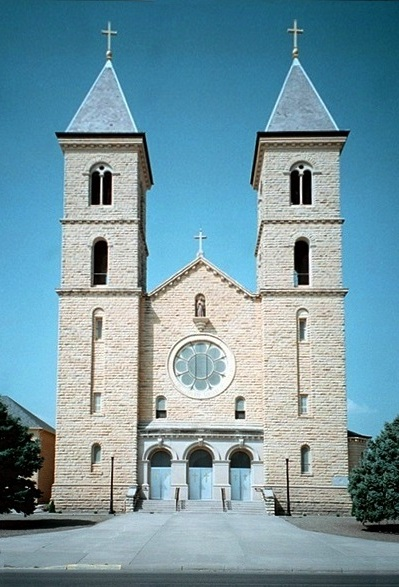
Front of the church (1997)

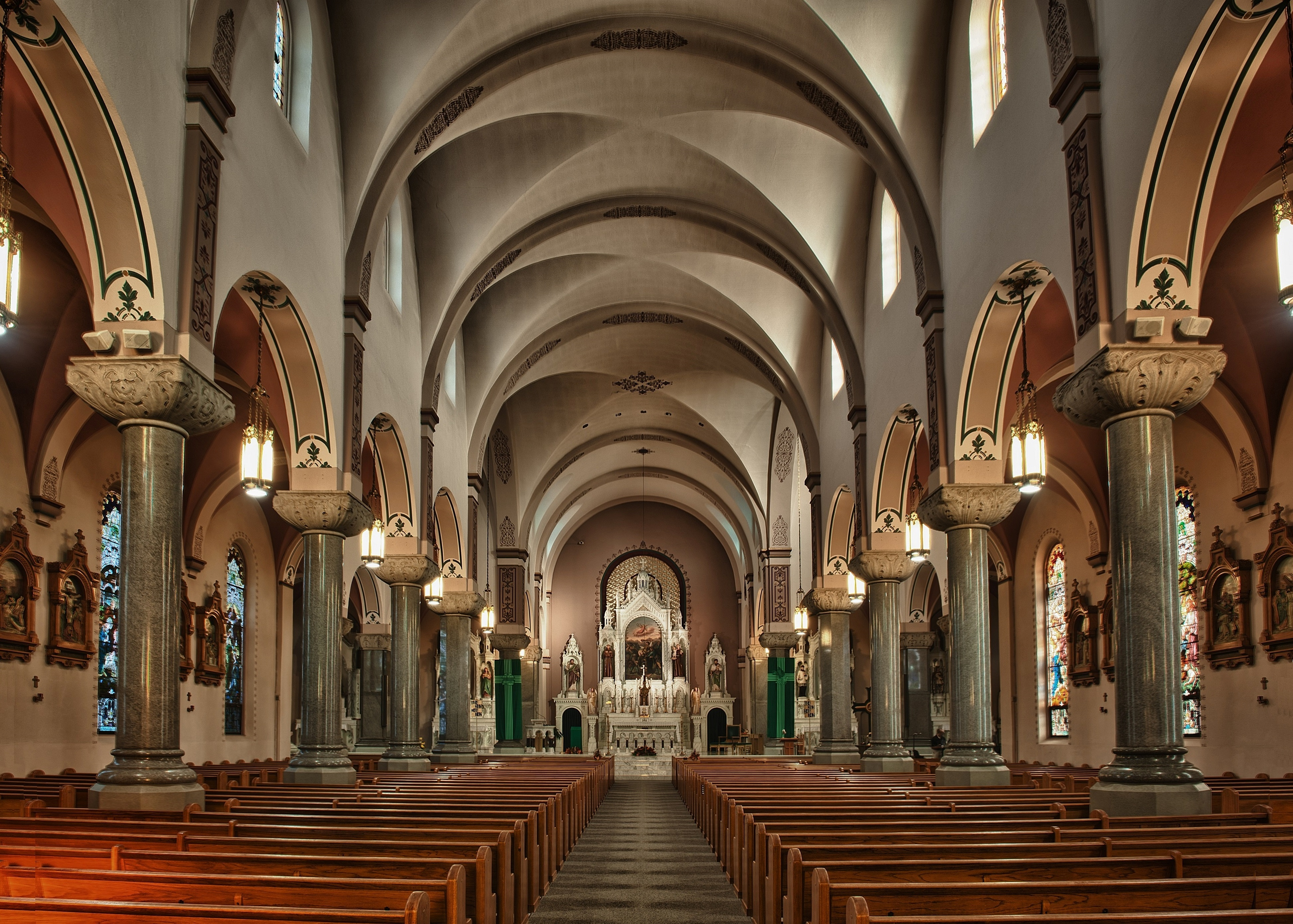
Nave of the church (2011)

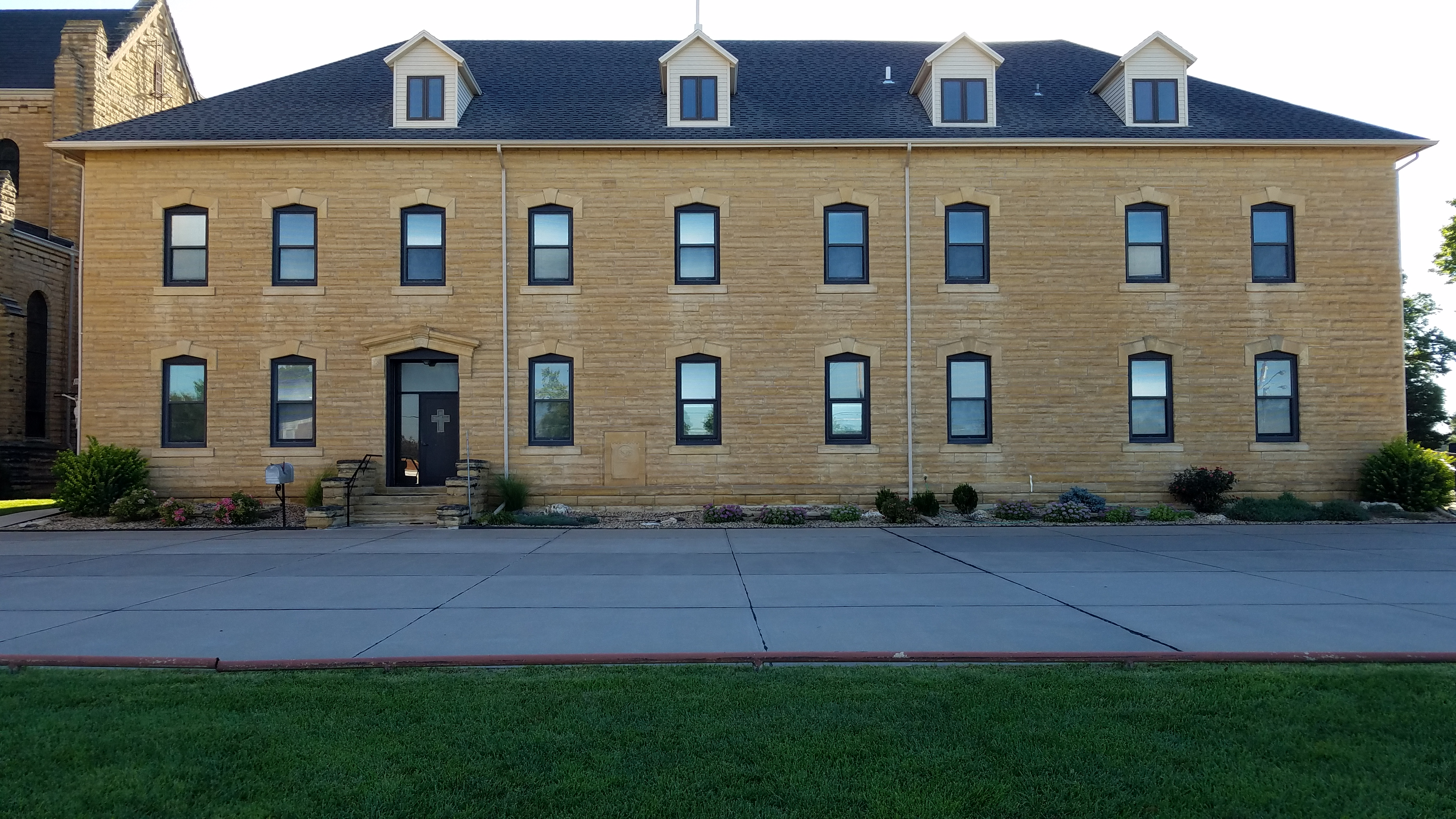
Convent next to church (2018)

=== Capuchins ===
Since the late 19th century, the faithful and their meeting places in Ellis County, Kansas, including St. Fidelis Catholic Church, have been overseen by the Capuchin Order, a subset of the Franciscans. A three-story building beside the church is a Friary of the Capuchins, and now houses retired and aging Capuchin priests.

== Notable persons ==
- Theodore Edgar McCarrick - former resident; laicized former cardinal and bishop of the Catholic Church. In January 2020, it was announced that McCarrick had moved away to an undisclosed location.
