= Stockrange, Kansas =

Ghost town in Ellis County, Kansas

- Ghost town
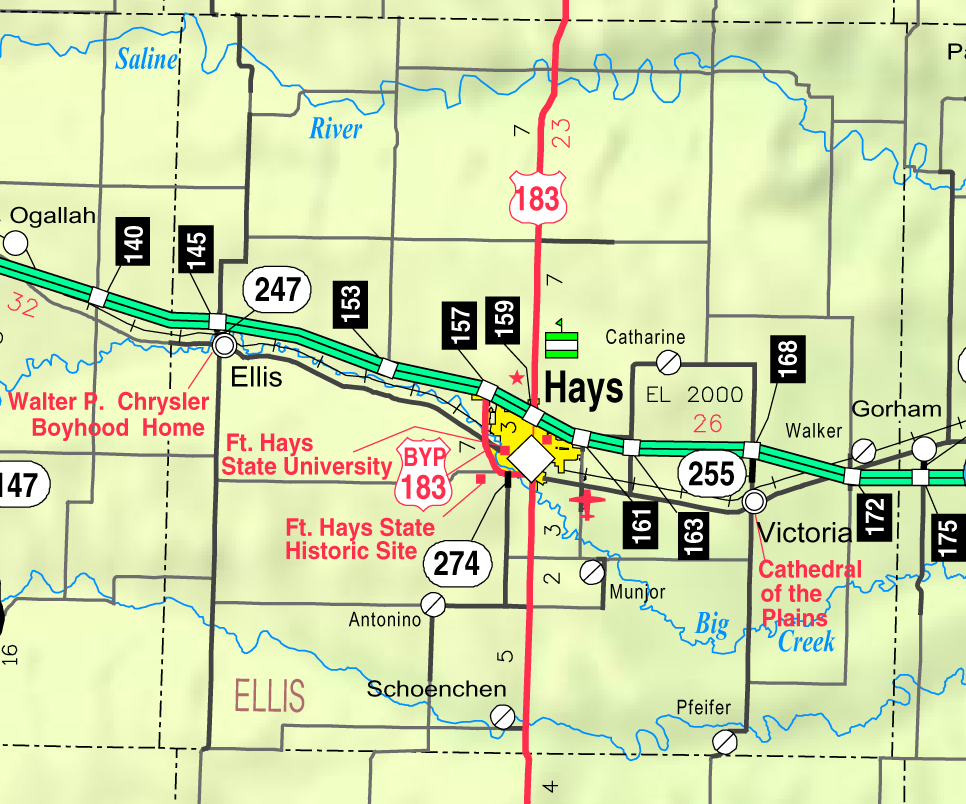
- KDOT map of Ellis County (legend)

- Location within Kansas Location within the United States
- Coordinates: 38°39′05″N 99°33′36″W
- Country: United States
- State: Kansas
- County: Ellis
- Elevation: 2,159 ft (658 m)

Population
  - Total: 0
- Time zone: UTC-6 (CST)
  - Summer (DST): UTC-5 (CDT)
- Area code: 785
- GNIS ID: 482185

Stockrange is a ghost town in Lookout Township, Ellis County, Kansas, United States.

== History ==
Stockrange was issued a post office in 1883. The post office was discontinued in 1895. Stockrange was re-formed in Trego County, with a post office from 1900 to 1908. The area was part of Smoky Hill Township until its consolidation into Lookout Township in the 1970s.
