= Victoria, Kansas =

City in Ellis County, Kansas

- City
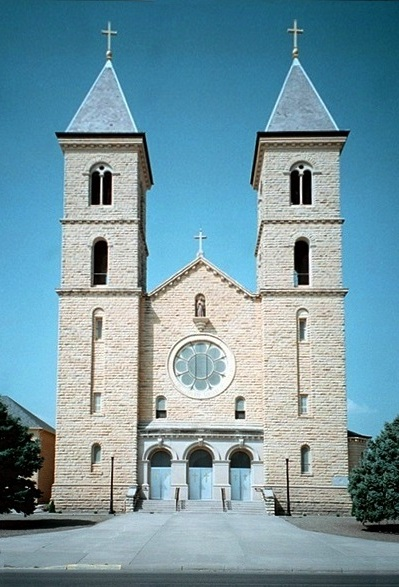
- The Basilica of St. Fidelis (1997)

- Location within Ellis County and Kansas

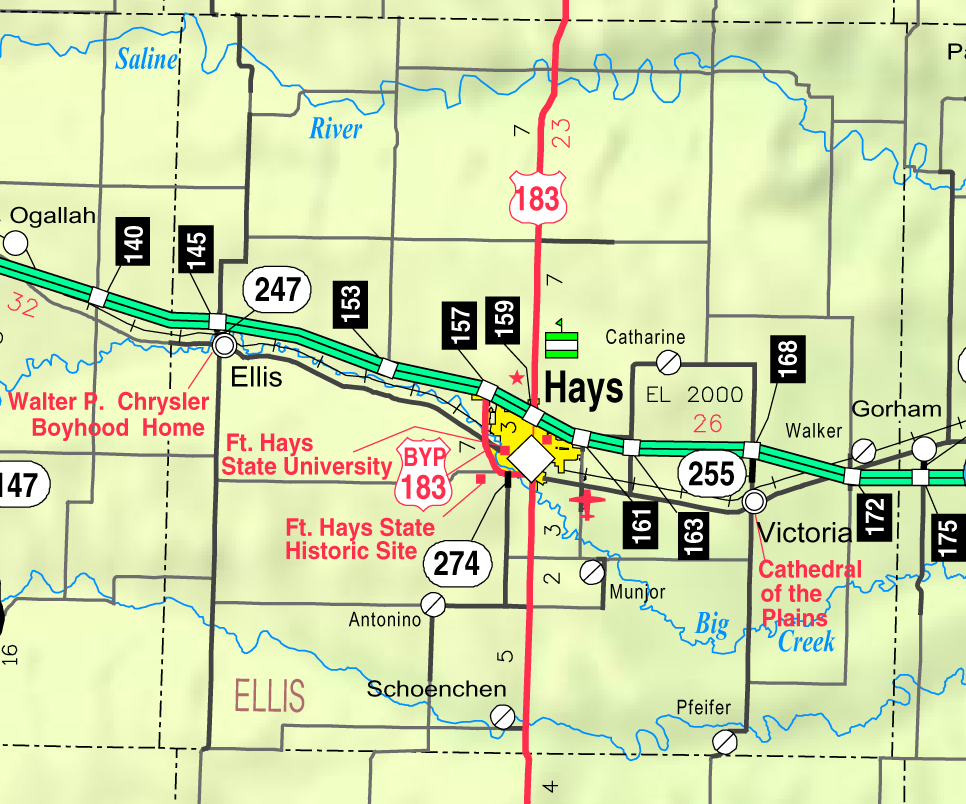
- KDOT map of Ellis County (legend)
- Coordinates: 38°51′14″N 99°08′51″W
- Country: United States
- State: Kansas
- County: Ellis
- Founded (station): 1873
- Platted (Victoria): 1880
- Incorporated: 1913 (merger with Herzog)
- Named for: Queen Victoria

Area
  - Total: 0.60 sq mi (1.55 km^{2})
  - Land: 0.60 sq mi (1.55 km^{2})
  - Water: 0 sq mi (0.00 km^{2})
- Elevation: 1,933 ft (589 m)

Population (2020)
  - Total: 1,129
  - Density: 1,890/sq mi (728/km^{2})
- Time zone: UTC-6 (CST)
  - Summer (DST): UTC-5 (CDT)
- ZIP Code: 67671
- Area code: 785
- FIPS code: 20-73775
- GNIS ID: 2397136
- Website: victoriaks.com

Victoria is a city in Herzog Township, Ellis County, Kansas, United States. As of the 2020 census, the population of the city was 1,129.

== History ==
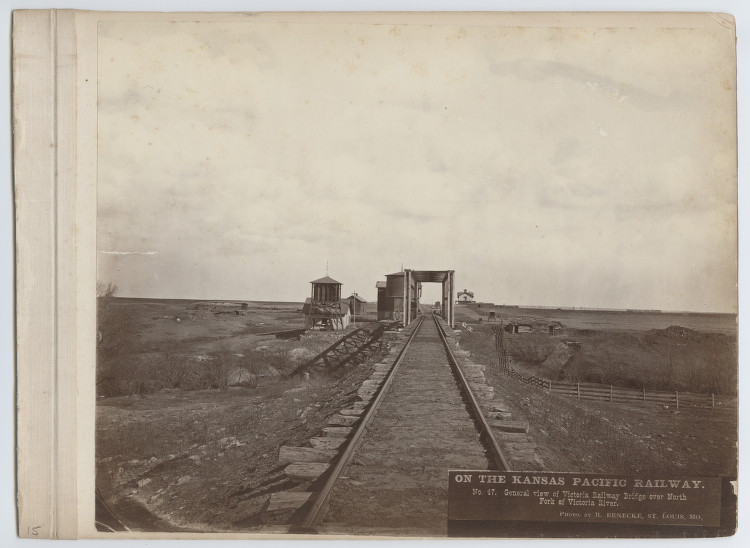
Victoria Station, 1873. Robert Benecke In the distance just to the right of the bridge over North Fork of Big Creek is the station, Victoria Manor. In 1867, this was the location of Campbell's Camp.

The town site originated in the 1867 construction of the Kansas Pacific Railway into western Kansas to connect St. Louis to Denver and to open the land to settlement. The railroad's sudden rerouting and construction west of Junction City was opposed by a Cheyenne military society who attacked the Campbell camp who were establishing a bridge grade across the North Fork of Big Creek at this location (pictured). Commanded by Captain George Armes, the immediate U.S. military response resulted in the Battle of the Saline River, which was followed by two years of open conflict.

=== Victoria Colony ===
George Grant was a Scottish entrepreneur who had established wealth and a clientele that counted the British nobility. In 1873, George Grant arrived in Kansas leading a party of 30 young adults and youth of Scottish and English nobility, including some remittance men sent away by their families to live on stipends. Founding the first of several organized transatlantic settlements in Ellis County, Grant intended to create a ranching community, some lesser nobles of the party hoping to establish large estates in the frontier. Notably, this group brought a herd of thoroughbred Aberdeen Angus cattle, some from Queen Victoria's own stock. Including four bulls, this herd is credited with establishing the American Angus breed.

The colony occupied a roughly 10 mile-wide swath land sections from the tracks south to the Smoky Hill River. With the settlement named Victoria to honor the Queen, the Kansas Pacific Railroad immediately constructed a relatively elaborate stone station-hotel for the colony. At Grant's specification, the Victoria Manor had accommodations befitting gentry waiting for completion of their new homes. The ground floor held a ballroom intended for community gatherings. Over 200 Britons arrived in the following years.

Grant brought British architect Robert William Edis to the colony to design his manor house and to lay out his dream town. Grant's Villa became a historic landmark, but the ultimate Victoria plat was an unprepossessing 3 by 3 grid of square blocks. Grant also directed the construction of the St. George Episcopal church, a stone building. Completed in 1877, this was the first church built in the county.

Many of the colonists, however, were reputed for being more interested in sports and dancing than in raising livestock, hiring overseers to manage some estates. The home families of the remittance men learned of this and reduced the stipends, driving these colonists to leave. Having lost his fortune, Grant's sudden death in 1878 accelerated the departure of others of the colony. Some returned to Britain; others left for South America. Grant was buried before the steps of the St. George Church, which would never be consecrated. After Grant's death, the Victoria townsite was platted in 1880 by remaining colonists, particularly Margarat Grant Dunan, niece, caretaker, and executor of the George Grant estate.

Today, the platted church grounds are a largely unoccupied cemetery with a monument to Grant's contribution to American Angus breeds.

While most of the English left, certain Scottish families remained, notably the descendants of Grant as well as the Philips, four of whom served as Mayor of Hays.

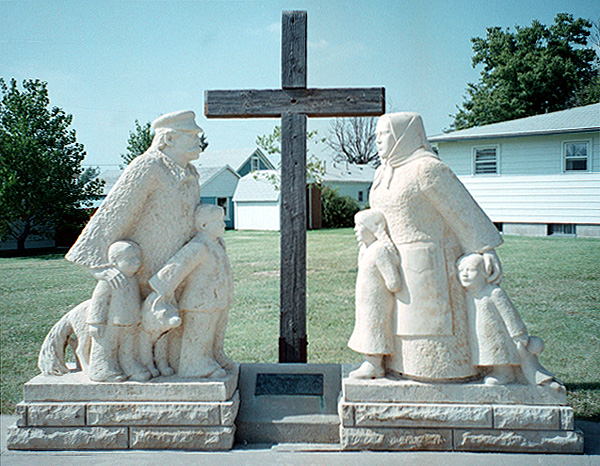
Commemorative statue of a Volga German pioneer family in Victoria (1997)

=== Herzog ===
This section covers the Volga German settlement of Herzog. For the broader history of Russian-German immigrants in Ellis County, see Ellis County History, English and Russian-German immigrants.

In 1875, a party of Volga Germans from villages near Saratov, Russia, seeking a place to establish traditional farming villages, were shown locations in Ellis County. The first location, the clay-soiled Ellis County "Hogback" was so disappointing that some in the party resolved to return to Russia. But after being shown locations in the eastern half of the county (the future Catherine and Schoenchen/Pfeifer sites), the party established the first Volga-German village in the county one-half mile north of the tracks from the Victoria Station. The original plat registered for the town is named "Herzog or North Victoria". As the other Volga German villages were formed, Herzog's Roman Catholic settlers built a series of churches which culminated in the construction of St. Fidelis Catholic Church, known as "The Cathedral of the Plains," in 1911. When the German's first arrived at the station, Rev. Laing relates, there was only the station-hotel and one other building in Victoria. Herzog grew rapidly and later adopted the station's name. Herzog and the smaller Victoria merged to incorporate under the name Victoria in 1913.

Such were the numbers of German-Russian settlers in Ellis County and adjoining Rush County, such was their adoption of western Russian farming practice and community structure, and such was their adoption of Russian dress and elements of Russian language, Kansans referred to these settlements as "Little Russia". And such was the importance of Herzog that was soon referred to as "Russia Minor".

A traditional religious community, Herzog's Catholic services were first held in the open around an erected cross, then in the home of Alois Dreiling after it was constructed. A typical two-story, four-room I-frame prairie farmhouse, attendance soon was too much for the flooring to withstand and a wood framed addition was built onto the home to hold church services. This addition is marked as the second church, first Catholic church, built in the county. The growing community soon overwhelmed this facility.

The only Catholic in the Victoria Colony, Sir Walter C. Maxwell had high interest in Herzog and completed a stone church for the town in 1877. This church was overcrowded almost as soon as it was finished.

The Kansas Pacific Railroad donated 10 acres of land for the community's religious use in 1879. Father Anthony Mary, who had previous led the construction of many churches, arrived and in November, 1881, and began construction on the original St. Fidelis Church at Herzog. Seating 600 parishioners, construction began in 1880 and the church was consecrated 1884.

Even as this church was completed, it was soon insufficient for the needs of the town and the Catholic villages at large and the Basilica of St. Fidelis, "The Cathedral of the Plains," was constructed over 1908-1911.

=== Victoria Auxiliary Field ===
In 1942, the U.S. Army built Walker Army Airfield three miles northeast of Victoria. During World War II, thousands were stationed at the airfield, most for training in operation of the Boeing B-29 Superfortress bomber aircraft. The military closed the base in 1946. In 1949, after the formation of the United States Air Force, that service designated the base "Victoria Auxiliary Field", but never operated the facility.

=== Bypassed by the Interstate ===
Originally, the Golden Belt Road followed by U.S. Highway 40 passed through Victoria. In 1966, construction of Interstate 70 was completed through Ellis County, bypassing the state highway designation and routing its traffic to the north of the town. While the Interstate increased traffic through the general corridor, regional centers such as Hays and Salina found greater expansion in commerce than Victoria.

== Geography ==
Victoria is located on Kansas Highway 255 (K-255) 1-mile (1.6 km) south of Interstate 70 in northwestern Kansas, Victoria is approximately 9 miles (14 km) east of Hays (the county seat), 129 miles (208 km) northwest of Wichita, and 243 miles (391 km) west of Kansas City.

The city lies roughly 9 miles (14 km) north of the Smoky Hill River in the Smoky Hills region of the Great Plains. The city sits on the eastern side of the North Fork of Big Creek, part of the Smoky Hill River watershed.

According to the United States Census Bureau, the city has a total area of 0.59 square miles (1.53 km^{2}), all land.

== Demographics ==
Historical population
Census	Pop.	Note	%±
1920	600		—
1930	637		6.2%
1940	884		38.8%
1950	988		11.8%
1960	1,170		18.4%
1970	1,246		6.5%
1980	1,328		6.6%
1990	1,157		−12.9%
2000	1,208		4.4%
2010	1,214		0.5%
2020	1,129		−7.0%
U.S. Decennial Census

=== 2010 census ===
As of the 2010 United States census, there were 1,214 people, 496 households, and 316 families residing in the city. The population density was 2,068.1 inhabitants per square mile (798.5/km^{2}). There were 530 housing units at an average density of 902.9 per square mile (348.6/km^{2}). The racial makeup of the city was 98.5% White, 0.3% American Indian, 0.2% African American, 0.1% from some other race, and 0.8% from two or more races. Hispanics and Latinos of any race were 0.5% of the population.

There were 496 households, of which 29.6% had children under the age of 18 living with them, 53.4% were married couples living together, 3.8% had a male householder with no wife present, 6.5% had a female householder with no husband present, and 36.3% were non-families. 33.1% of all households were made up of individuals, and 15.7% had someone living alone who was 65 years of age or older. The average household size was 2.30, and the average family size was 2.93.

The median age in the city was 41.7 years. 22.3% of residents were under the age of 18; 6.8% were between the ages of 18 and 24; 24.8% were from 25 to 44; 24.6% were from 45 to 64; and 21.3% were 65 years of age or older. The gender makeup of the city was 50.9% male and 49.1% female.

The median income for a household in the city was $46,125, and the median income for a family was $64,000. Males had a median income of $35,875 versus $26,058 for females. The per capita income for the city was $22,636. About 3.2% of families and 4.1% of the population were below the poverty line, including 5.4% of those under age 18 and 6.6% of those age 65 or over.

== Economy ==
As of 2012, 61.5% of the population over the age of 16 was in the labor force. 0.0% was in the armed forces, and 61.5% was in the civilian labor force with 59.7% being employed and 1.8% unemployed. The composition, by occupation, of the employed civilian labor force was: 26.7% in management, business, science, and arts; 26.2% in sales and office occupations; 17.0% in production, transportation, and material moving; 15.9% in natural resources, construction, and maintenance; and 14.2% in service occupations. The three industries employing the largest percentages of the working civilian labor force were: educational services, and health care and social assistance (24.1%); agriculture, forestry, fishing and hunting, and mining (10.7%); and Wholesale trade (8.2%).

The cost of living in Victoria is relatively low; compared to a U.S. average of 100, the cost of living index for the community is 81.5. As of 2012, the median home value in the city was $101,200, the median selected monthly owner cost was $1,042 for housing units with a mortgage and $428 for those without, and the median gross rent was $555.

== Government ==
Victoria is a city of the third class with a mayor-council form of government. The city council consists of five members, and it meets on the third Monday of each month.

Originally, Victoria was within the organized Victoria Township. However, Victoria Township merged into an enlarged Herzog Township, which had previously absorbed Walker Township and a portion of Saline Township.

Victoria lies within Kansas's 1st U.S. Congressional District. For the purposes of representation in the Kansas Legislature, the city is located in the 40th district of the Kansas Senate and the 111th district of the Kansas House of Representatives.

== Education ==
=== Primary and secondary education ===
The community is served by Victoria USD 432 public school district, and operates two public schools in the city:

- Victoria Grade School (Grades Pre-K-6)
- Victoria High School (7-12)

== Infrastructure ==
=== Transportation ===
Interstate 70 and U.S. Route 40 run concurrently east-west roughly one mile north of Victoria. K-255 runs north–south from I-70 to Victoria's northern city limits.

The Kansas Pacific (KP) line of the Union Pacific Railroad runs northeast–southwest through the southern part of the city.

=== Utilities ===
Water distribution, sewer maintenance, and trash removal are the responsibility of the city government. Midwest Energy, Inc. provides electric power. Local residents primarily use natural gas for heating fuel; service is provided by Kansas Gas Service.

== Media ==
Victoria is in the Wichita-Hutchinson, Kansas television market.

== Culture ==
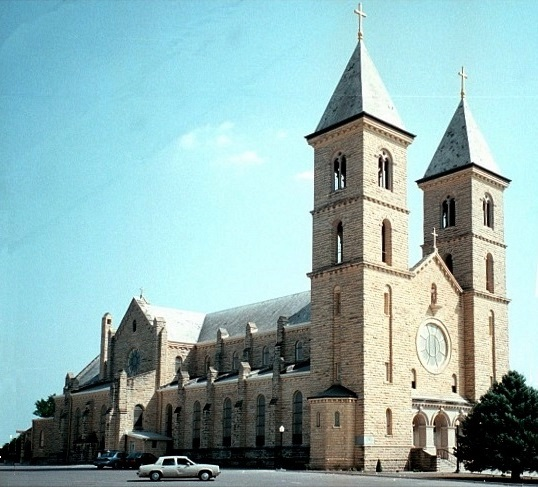
The Basilica of St. Fidelis (1997)

=== Events ===
The Herzogfest is Victoria's annual community festival, held to celebrate the city's ethnic German heritage. Held in August, it includes music concerts, a tractor pull, games for children, and other local entertainment. There is delicious food from the German heritage and other vendors.

=== Points of interest ===
- The Basilica of St. Fidelis, known as "The Cathedral of the Plains", is located in Victoria. Local Roman Catholic residents, having outgrown a series of church buildings as their population grew, began construction of the church in 1908. Built from native limestone based on plans by noted church architect John T. Comes, St. Fidelis Catholic Church was completed in 1911. William Jennings Bryan gave the church its nickname during a visit in 1912. In June 2014, the Roman Catholic Diocese of Salina dedicated the church as a minor basilica, renaming it the Basilica of St. Fidelis.
- Grant Cemetery is a preservation of the gravesites of George Grant and a few others dating to the 1880s on the grounds of the St. George Church, founded by Grant. Every 50 years, the American Aberdeen-Angus Breeders' Association commemorates the 1873 establishment of the first Aberdeen Angus herd in the United States. For the centennial in 1973, Hays artist Pete Felten Jr. installed a limestone sculpture of a Black Angus.
- Railroad Workers Cemetery is a preservation of the gravesites of a party of workers who were killed in 1867 while excavating the approaches to the railroad bridge just to the north. They were killed by Cheyenne Dog Soldiers who rejected the treaty permitting the construction, this action triggering the Battle of the Saline River.
- St. Fidelis Cemetery contains over 100 traditional German iron cross grave markers, the most iron crosses of the cemeteries in the Volga-German settlements. This cemetery also has a number of gravestones that were carved from the region's unusual Fencepost limestone by John Linenberger.

== Notable people ==
Notable individuals who were born in and/or have lived in Victoria include:

- Monty Beisel (1978- ), football linebacker
- Lucy Isabella Buckstone (1857-1893), actress
- Nate Dreiling (1990- ), football linebacker
- James "Scotty" Philip (1858-1911), American bison rancher
- Theodore McCarrick, laicized American cardinal of the Catholic Church and former Archbishop of Washington, D.C.

== Sister cities ==
- Kubelstein, Scheßlitz, Germany

== See also ==
- Walker Army Airfield, an abandoned World War II airfield.
