= Ellis Township =

Ellis Township may refer to the following townships in the United States:

- Ellis Township, Ellis County, Kansas
- Ellis Township, Michigan
