= Freedom Township, Ellis County, Kansas =

Freedom Township
- Township
- Location in Ellis County
- Coordinates: 38°44′00″N 099°07′30″W
- Country: United States
- State: Kansas
- County: Ellis

Area
  - Total: 45.10 sq mi (116.82 km^{2})
  - Land: 45.10 sq mi (116.82 km^{2})
  - Water: 0 sq mi (0 km^{2}) 0%
- Elevation: 1,929 ft (588 m)

Population (2020)
  - Total: 106
  - Density: 2.35/sq mi (0.907/km^{2})
- GNIS ID: 0475299

Freedom Township is a township in Ellis County, Kansas, United States. As of the 2020 census, its population was 106.

== History ==
The founder of the Victoria Colony, George Grant, built his home in the style of an English country house on the banks of Big Creek in 1873.

Volga Germans began settling in the area and founded Pfeifer in August 1876.

A post office was opened at Easdale in 1878. The post office was moved two miles south across the Smoky Hill River to Pfeifer in 1887.

In 2023, the townships of Ellis County were redrawn. Freedom Township absorbed Wheatland Township, which became West Freedom within the township.

== Geography ==
Freedom Township covers an area of 45.1 square miles (117 km^{2}) and contains no incorporated settlements. According to the USGS, it contains one cemetery, Holy Cross.

The Smoky Hill River and the streams of Big Creek, Duck Creek and Eagle Creek run through this township.
