= Chetolah, Kansas =

Ghost town in Ellis County, Kansas

Coordinates: 38°45′11.3″N 99°30′00.6″W

Chetolah is a ghost town in Lookout Township of Ellis County, Kansas, United States.

== History ==
Chetolah was founded in the 1880s when promoters laid out a town site and built a hotel, livery stable, and store. The Chetolah Town Site Company was incorporated in 1888 and then renamed the Chetolah Land and Town Company in 1889. The company had plans for a railroad connection, but no such connection was ever built.

The initial settlement was unsuccessful, but the town revived in the 1890s with the purported discovery of gold in the grey Carlile Shale of the surrounding hills. A three-year gold rush ensued, and the town grew as promoters attempted various schemes for recovering alleged traces of gold from the shales along the Smoky Hill River. The hotel reopened and a bridge was built across the river into the settlement. Following failure of the gold rush, which both the first Kansas state geologist, Erasmus Haworth, and Thomas Edison had previously declared a hoax, Chetolah was abandoned and became a ghost town. Today, very little remains of the settlement.

== See also ==
- List of ghost towns in Kansas
- Smoky Hill City, Kansas
