= Jaren Kanak =

American football player (born 2004)

No. 81 – Tennessee Titans
- Position: Tight end
- Roster status: Injured reserve

Personal information
- Born: February 10, 2004 (age 22); Hays, Kansas, U.S.
- Listed height: 6 ft 2 in (1.88 m)
- Listed weight: 234 lb (106 kg)

Career information
- High school: Hays (Hays, Kansas)
- College: Oklahoma (2022–2025)
- NFL draft: 2026: 7th round, 225th overall pick

Career history
- Tennessee Titans (2026–present)

Awards and highlights
- Third-team All-SEC (2025)
- Stats at Pro Football Reference

Jaren Kanak (born February 10, 2004) is an American professional football tight end for the Tennessee Titans of the National Football League (NFL). He played college football for the Oklahoma Sooners and was selected by the Titans in the seventh round of the 2026 NFL draft.

== Early life ==
Kanak attended Hays High School in Hays, Kansas. He played linebacker, quarterback and wide receiver in high school. As a senior, he rushed for a school record 1,615 and passed for 910 yards and 12 touchdowns. He originally committed to play college football at Clemson University before flipping his commitment to the University of Oklahoma.

== College career ==
Kanak played linebacker his first three years at Oklahoma from 2022 to 2024. He played in 39 games with 10 starts and had 103 tackles and two sacks. Prior to his senior year in 2025, he switched positions to tight end. Kanak opened the season as the starter and in his first game had five receptions for 90 yards.

== Professional career ==
Pre-draft measurables
Height	Weight	Arm length	Hand span	Wingspan	40-yard dash	10-yard split	20-yard split	20-yard shuttle	Three-cone drill	Vertical jump	Broad jump	Bench press
6 ft 2 in (1.88 m)	234 lb (106 kg)	30 1/2 in (0.77 m)	9 3/8 in (0.24 m)	6 ft 2 3/8 in (1.89 m)	4.52 s	1.61 s	2.66 s	4.27 s	7.21 s	36.0 in (0.91 m)	9 ft 11 in (3.02 m)	24 reps
All values from NFL Combine/Pro Day

Kanak was selected by the Tennessee Titans in the seventh round with the 225th overall pick of the 2026 NFL draft. He was placed on season–ending injured reserve due to a torn pectoral muscle on August 16, 2026.
