= James "Scotty" Philip =

American politician

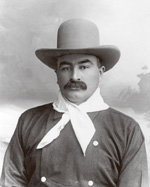

Member of the South Dakota Senate from the 25th district
- In office 1899–1900
- Preceded by: Denton B. Thayer (R)
- Succeeded by: Fred S. Rowe (D)

Personal details
- Born: James Philip; April 30, 1858 Dallas, Morayshire, Scotland
- Died: July 23, 1911 (aged 53)
- Resting place: Scotty Philip Cemetery, Fort Pierre, Stanley, South Dakota
- Citizenship: American
- Party: Democratic
- Spouse(s): Sarah Larribee (m. 1879 – 1911); his death
- Profession: Rancher

James "Scotty" Philip (30 April 1858 – 23 July 1911) was a Scottish-born American rancher and politician in South Dakota, remembered as the "Man who saved the Buffalo" due to his role in helping to preserve the American bison from extinction.

== Early years ==
Philip was born in Dallas, Morayshire, Scotland. He emigrated to the United States in 1874 at the age of 15. He first settled in Victoria, Kansas, but moved to Dakota Territory on hearing of the discovery of gold in the Black Hills.

In 1879 he married Sarah Larribee (1851 – 1937), in Fort Robinson, Nebraska: in 1881 they settled down to ranch in Stanley County, Dakota Territory, just east of the present location of Philip, whose name memorializes the man who helped found it. At the time, Stanley County was still part of the Great Sioux Indian Reservation and ranching by non-Natives was illegal: the Philips were allowed to locate their ranch there because Sarah was a Native American.

Philip was elected as a Democrat to the South Dakota State Senate in 1898, representing Stanley County and the 25th district from 1899 to 1900.

== Saving the bison ==
While he was building his cattle herd, Scotty Philip met Pete Dupree, whose son Fred had rescued 5 bison calves from an 1881 buffalo hunt along the Grand River. After Dupree's death, Philip decided to preserve the species from extinction, and in 1899 he purchased Dupree's herd, which now numbered 74 head, from Dupree's brother-in-law, Dug Carlin.

Philip prepared a special pasture for the bison along the western side of the Missouri River north of ere in 1901.

Scotty Philip died suddenly on July 23, 1911: by that time the herd had grown to approximately a thousand head. He was buried on a family cemetery near his buffalo pasture. As the funeral procession passed, some of the bison came down out of the hills. Newspapers of the time suggested the bison were "showing their respect to the man who had saved them".

== Legacy ==
Bison from Philip's herd helped restock herds throughout the United States, including the large herd at Custer State Park.

Philip is the namesake of Philip, South Dakota. He was inducted to the Hall of Great Westerners at the Cowboy Hall of Fame in Oklahoma City, Oklahoma in 1958.

Mr. Philip was inducted as a hall of fame and historical honoree by the National Buffalo Foundation in 1982.

== See also ==
- George Philip Jr., son of George Philip who was the nephew of James "Scotty" Philip.
