= Pfeifer, Kansas =

Unincorporated community in Ellis County, Kansas

- Unincorporated community
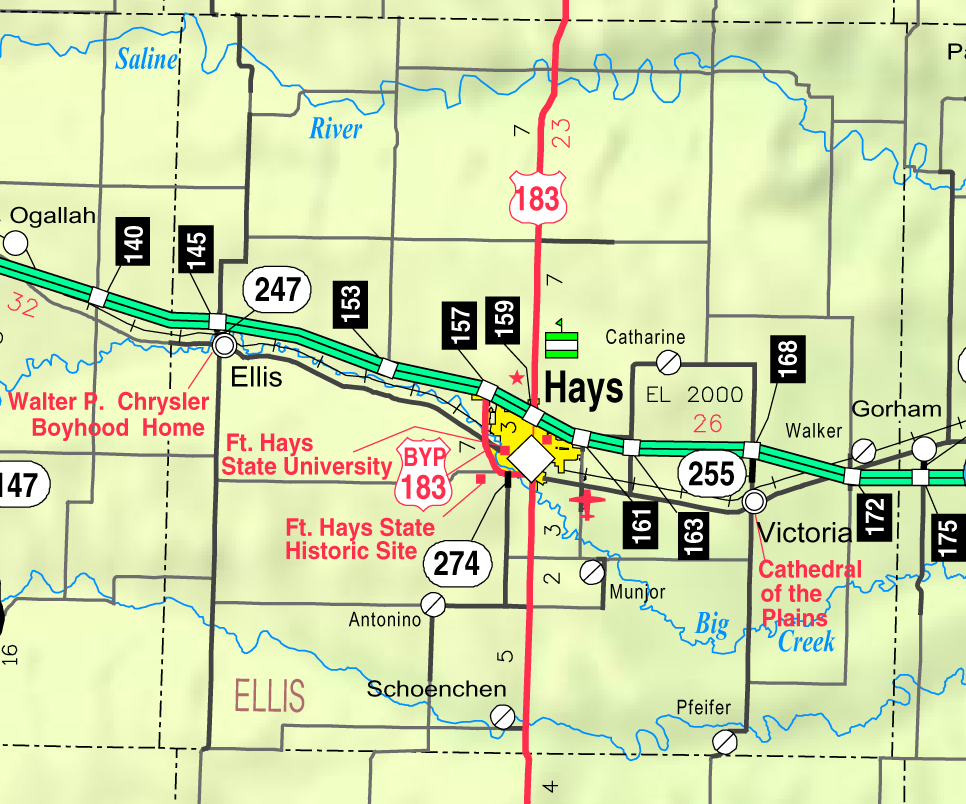
- KDOT map of Ellis County (legend)

- Location within Kansas Location within the United States
- Coordinates: 38°42′29″N 99°09′56″W
- Country: United States
- State: Kansas
- County: Ellis
- Township: Freedom
- Founded: 1876
- Elevation: 1,880 ft (570 m)
- Time zone: UTC-6 (CST)
  - Summer (DST): UTC-5 (CDT)
- ZIP Code: 67660
- Area code: 785
- FIPS code: 20-55650
- GNIS ID: 475392

Pfeifer is an unincorporated community in Freedom Township, Ellis County, Kansas, United States. It is located 10 miles (16 km) south of Victoria.

== History ==
Volga German immigrants founded Pfeifer in August 1876, naming it after the village they had emigrated from in Russia. The final group of Volga German immigrants arrived from the community of Kamenka in June 1878. In 1884, the settlement moved to its current location. The former Easdale post office relocated to Pfeifer, two miles south across the Smoky Hill River, in 1887, and remained in operation under that name until 1961.

Beginning in 1879, local residents constructed a series of church buildings that culminated in the completion of Holy Cross Church in May 1918.

== Geography ==
Pfeifer is located approximately 8 miles (13 km) east of U.S. Highway 183, 11.5 miles (18.5 km) south of Interstate 70 and 15 miles (24 km) southeast of Hays, the county seat.

Pfeifer lies on the south side of the Smoky Hill River in the Smoky Hills region of the Great Plains.

== Transportation ==
Saratov Street, a paved county road, runs north–south through Pfeifer. Northeast of the community, it becomes Pfeifer Avenue, connecting Pfeifer with Victoria 10 miles (16 km) to the north.

== Notable people ==
Notable individuals who were born in and/or have lived in Pfeifer include:

- Monty Basgall (1922–2005), Major League Baseball major second baseman and coach and minor league manager
