= Antonino, Kansas =

Unincorporated community in Ellis County, Kansas

- Unincorporated community
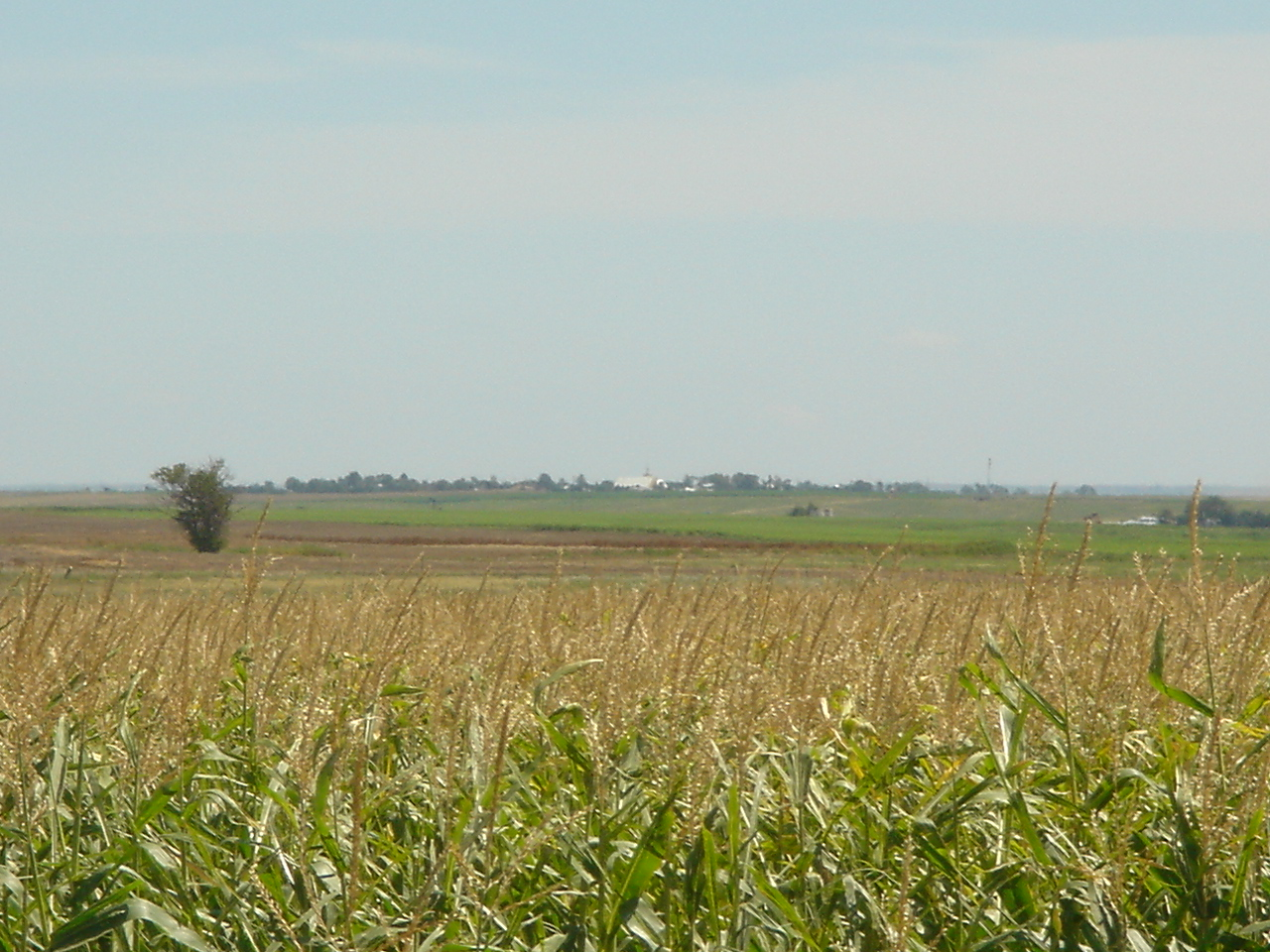
- Antonino, from about 2 miles to the northwest.

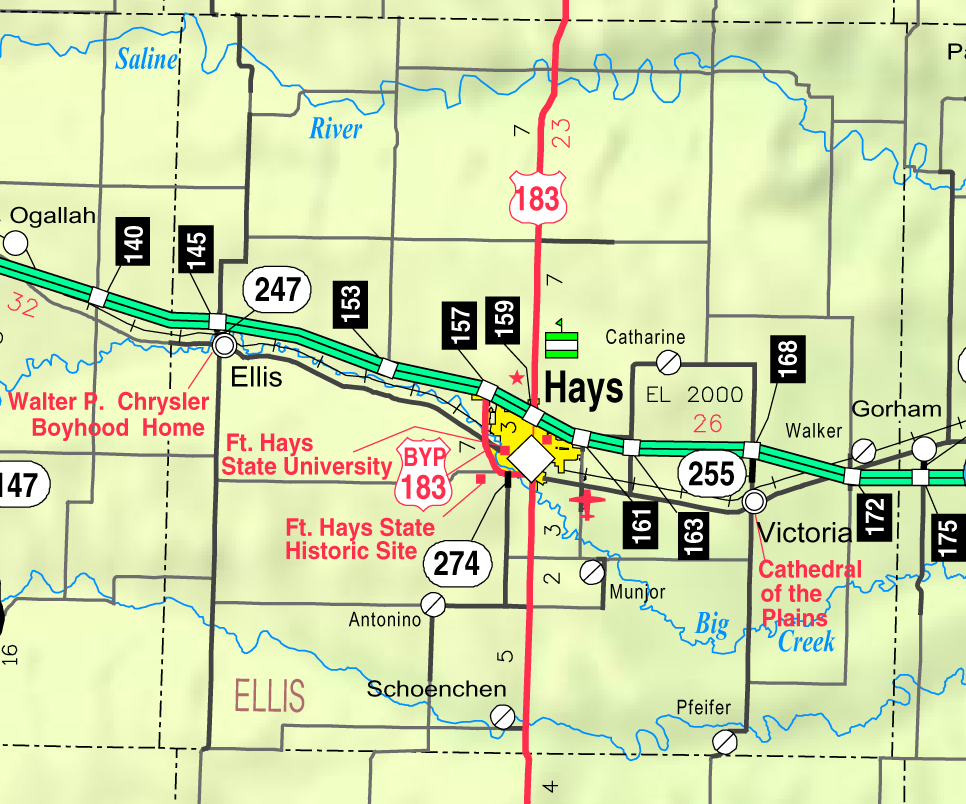
- KDOT map of Ellis County (legend)

- Location within Kansas Location within the United States
- Coordinates: 38°47′02″N 99°23′33″W
- Country: United States
- State: Kansas
- County: Ellis
- Township: Lookout
- Founded: 1904
- Elevation: 2,106 ft (642 m)
- Time zone: UTC-6 (CST)
  - Summer (DST): UTC-5 (CDT)
- ZIP Code: 67601
- Area code: 785
- FIPS code: 20-02050
- GNIS ID: 475280

Antonino is an unincorporated community in Lookout Township, Ellis County, Kansas, United States.

== History ==
Due to the distance from their homes to St. Francis Church in Munjor, a group of the church's Volga German parishioners requested a new parish and subsequently founded Antonino in 1904. They originally wanted to name the new community St. Anthony, but the post office rejected that name for being too similar to that of Anthony, Kansas. Instead, they applied for the name "Saint Antonino" after a village in Brazil in which several residents had once lived. Due to postal regulations at that time, however, "Saint" was removed from the name. Another account claims that Antonino was named for Anthony Sauer, who was said to be the community's oldest resident.

Local residents built a new church in 1905, and a local post office opened the same year. A school house was completed in 1939, and then a new church building in 1952. The post office closed in 1984.

== Geography ==
Antonino is located at 38°47′02″N 99°23′33″W (38.7080679, -99.1656536) at an elevation of 2,106 feet (642 m). It is 4 miles (6.4 km) west of U.S. Route 183, 9.5 miles (15.3 km) south of Interstate 70 and 7.5 miles (12.1 km) south-southwest of Hays, the county seat.

Antonino lies 4 miles (6.4 km) north of the Smoky Hill River in the Smoky Hills region of the Great Plains.

== Education ==
The community is served by Hays USD 489 public school district.

== Transportation ==
Antonino Road, a paved county road, runs east–west through the community, connecting it to U.S. Route 183 to the east.
