= Philip, South Dakota =

- City
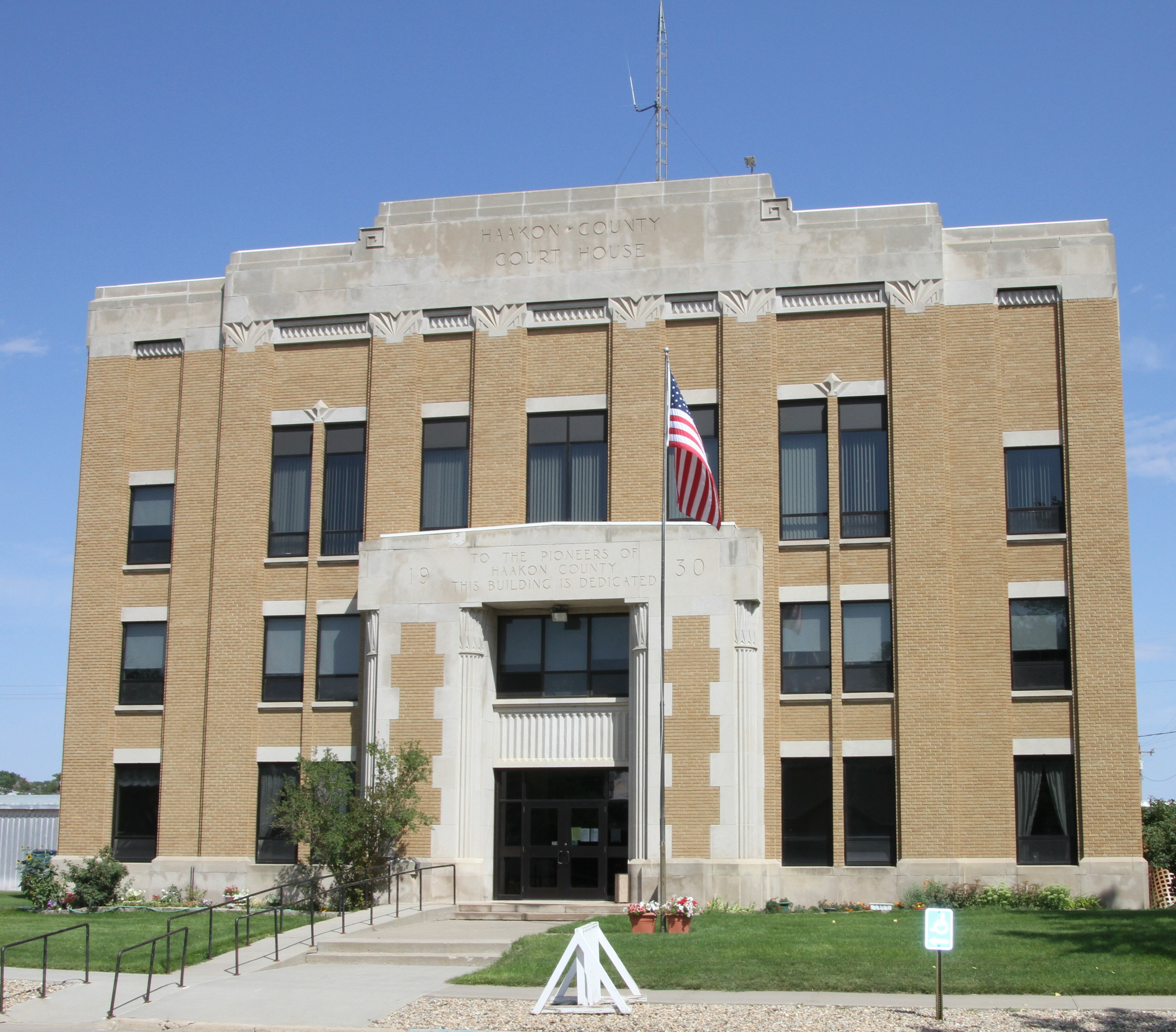
- Haakon County Courthouse in Philip, August 2017
- Motto: "Where The Sun Kisses The Earth"
- Location in Haakon County and the state of South Dakota
- Coordinates: 44°02′27″N 101°39′53″W
- Country: United States
- State: South Dakota
- County: Haakon
- Founded: 1907

Area
  - Total: 0.59 sq mi (1.54 km^{2})
  - Land: 0.59 sq mi (1.54 km^{2})
  - Water: 0 sq mi (0.00 km^{2})
- Elevation: 2,195 ft (669 m)

Population (2020)
  - Total: 759
  - Density: 1,277.3/sq mi (493.18/km^{2})
- Time zone: UTC−7 (Mountain (MST))
  - Summer (DST): UTC−6 (MDT)
- ZIP code: 57567
- Area code: 605
- FIPS code: 46-49300
- GNIS feature ID: 1267530
- Website: www.philipsd.us

Philip is a city in and the county seat of rural Haakon County, South Dakota, United States. The population was 759 at the 2020 census.

== History ==
Philip was laid out in 1907 when the Chicago and North Western Railway was extended to that point. It was incorporated in 1908. In 1914, Philip was designated seat of the newly formed Haakon County. The city was named for James "Scotty" Philip; the local high school mascot is the Scotch terrier, or "Scottie", in his honor.

== Economy ==
Agriculture is the primary industry in Philip. Businesses include two grain elevators, a livestock auction, veterinary clinic, and numerous other businesses providing goods and services related to the farms and ranches surrounding the community.

Philip is also home to Scotchman Industries, a manufacturer of metal fabrication machinery (hydraulic ironworkers, circular cold saws, band saws, tube & pipe notchers & measuring systems). The hospital and school are other major sources of employment within the community.

== Geography ==
According to the United States Census Bureau, the city has a total area of 0.60 square miles (1.55 km^{2}), all land.

Philip is located on the banks of the Bad River, which empties into the Missouri River at Fort Pierre.

=== Climate ===
Philip has a cool semi-arid climate (Köppen BSk). Winters are generally freezing, although warm chinook winds bring temperatures above 50 °F or 10 °C on sixteen afternoons during an average December to February period. Aridity during this period limits snowfall to a mean of 27.0 inches or 0.69 meters and a median of 18.2 inches (0.46 m), with median snow depth never above 2 inches (0.051 m). Overall Philip has a USDA hardiness zone of 4b, with minimum temperatures ranging from −25 to −20 °F (−31.7 to −28.9 °C).

During spring temperatures warm steadily, although 2.7 mornings in May still expect subfreezing minima. Thunderstorm rains make this the wettest time of the year, with averages around 3 inches or 76 millimeters of rain falling in May and June. During settled dry spells in the summer, temperatures can become exceedingly hot: the record being 116 °F or 46.7 °C on July 15, 2006, while sustained spells of sweltering and extremely dry weather are not uncommon, for instance July 1974 averaged a maximum of 96.6 °F (35.9 °C) and July 2012 98.2 °F (36.8 °C). The whole calendar year of 2012 saw only 7.15 inches (181.6 mm) of precipitation, whereas the single month of May 1982 saw as much as 8.83 inches (224.3 mm).

Climate data for Philip Airport, South Dakota, 1991–2020 normals, extremes 1907–present
Month	Jan	Feb	Mar	Apr	May	Jun	Jul	Aug	Sep	Oct	Nov	Dec	Year
Record high °F (°C)	75 (24)	76 (24)	88 (31)	96 (36)	105 (41)	112 (44)	116 (47)	113 (45)	108 (42)	98 (37)	84 (29)	72 (22)	116 (47)
Mean maximum °F (°C)	59.0 (15.0)	62.9 (17.2)	74.8 (23.8)	84.8 (29.3)	90.7 (32.6)	99.8 (37.7)	104.0 (40.0)	103.6 (39.8)	99.3 (37.4)	86.7 (30.4)	72.8 (22.7)	59.0 (15.0)	106.0 (41.1)
Mean daily maximum °F (°C)	34.1 (1.2)	37.8 (3.2)	48.9 (9.4)	59.2 (15.1)	70.0 (21.1)	81.0 (27.2)	89.5 (31.9)	88.5 (31.4)	79.0 (26.1)	62.9 (17.2)	48.1 (8.9)	36.3 (2.4)	61.3 (16.3)
Daily mean °F (°C)	22.1 (−5.5)	25.2 (−3.8)	35.5 (1.9)	45.6 (7.6)	56.6 (13.7)	67.4 (19.7)	75.0 (23.9)	73.2 (22.9)	63.3 (17.4)	48.3 (9.1)	34.9 (1.6)	24.2 (−4.3)	47.6 (8.7)
Mean daily minimum °F (°C)	10.2 (−12.1)	12.6 (−10.8)	22.1 (−5.5)	32.0 (0.0)	43.3 (6.3)	53.7 (12.1)	60.4 (15.8)	58.0 (14.4)	47.6 (8.7)	33.8 (1.0)	21.6 (−5.8)	12.2 (−11.0)	34.0 (1.1)
Mean minimum °F (°C)	−14.9 (−26.1)	−10.3 (−23.5)	−0.7 (−18.2)	14.5 (−9.7)	27.3 (−2.6)	40.8 (4.9)	49.1 (9.5)	45.8 (7.7)	33.2 (0.7)	17.2 (−8.2)	2.0 (−16.7)	−12.1 (−24.5)	−21.6 (−29.8)
Record low °F (°C)	−35 (−37)	−33 (−36)	−29 (−34)	2 (−17)	15 (−9)	32 (0)	37 (3)	36 (2)	20 (−7)	−7 (−22)	−25 (−32)	−30 (−34)	−35 (−37)
Average precipitation inches (mm)	0.43 (11)	0.47 (12)	0.89 (23)	1.71 (43)	2.96 (75)	2.90 (74)	1.83 (46)	1.48 (38)	1.23 (31)	1.45 (37)	0.49 (12)	0.44 (11)	16.28 (414)
Average precipitation days (≥ 0.01 in)	5.3	5.1	6.2	8.9	10.6	11.4	8.3	7.5	6.1	6.3	3.9	5.0	84.6
Source: NOAA

== Demographics ==
Historical population
Census	Pop.	Note	%±
1910	578		—
1920	647		11.9%
1930	786		21.5%
1940	833		6.0%
1950	810		−2.8%
1960	1,114		37.5%
1970	983		−11.8%
1980	1,088		10.7%
1990	1,077		−1.0%
2000	885		−17.8%
2010	779		−12.0%
2020	759		−2.6%
U.S. Decennial Census

=== 2020 census ===
As of the 2020 census, Philip had a population of 759. The median age was 44.4 years; 21.9% of residents were under the age of 18 and 27.1% were 65 years of age or older. For every 100 females there were 95.1 males, and for every 100 females age 18 and over there were 95.1 males age 18 and over.

According to the 2020 Decennial Census Demographic and Housing Characteristics, 0.0% of residents lived in urban areas, while 100.0% lived in rural areas.

There were 325 households in Philip, of which 25.5% had children under the age of 18 living in them. Of all households, 46.2% were married-couple households, 19.7% were households with a male householder and no spouse or partner present, and 28.9% were households with a female householder and no spouse or partner present. About 35.1% of all households were made up of individuals and 20.0% had someone living alone who was 65 years of age or older.

There were 372 housing units, of which 12.6% were vacant. The homeowner vacancy rate was 0.8% and the rental vacancy rate was 10.6%.

Racial composition as of the 2020 census
Race	Number	Percent
White	685	90.3%
Black or African American	1	0.1%
American Indian and Alaska Native	17	2.2%
Asian	13	1.7%
Native Hawaiian and Other Pacific Islander	0	0.0%
Some other race	10	1.3%
Two or more races	33	4.3%
Hispanic or Latino (of any race)	4	0.5%

=== 2010 census ===
As of the census of 2010, there were 779 people, 375 households, and 197 families residing in the city. The population density was 1,298.3 inhabitants per square mile (501.3/km^{2}). There were 423 housing units at an average density of 705.0 per square mile (272.2/km^{2}). The racial makeup of the city was 94.4% White, 0.3% African American, 2.2% Native American, 0.8% Asian, and 2.4% from two or more races. Hispanic or Latino of any race were 1.2% of the population.

There were 375 households, of which 20.0% had children under the age of 18 living with them, 44.3% were married couples living together, 6.9% had a female householder with no husband present, 1.3% had a male householder with no wife present, and 47.5% were non-families. 44.8% of all households were made up of individuals, and 24% had someone living alone who was 65 years of age or older. The average household size was 1.98 and the average family size was 2.79.

The median age in the city was 51.5 years. 19.1% of residents were under the age of 18; 4.4% were between the ages of 18 and 24; 18.7% were from 25 to 44; 30.3% were from 45 to 64; and 27.5% were 65 years of age or older. The gender makeup of the city was 45.8% male and 54.2% female.

=== 2000 census ===
As of the census of 2000, there were 885 people, 367 households, and 226 families residing in the city. The population density was 1,527.7 inhabitants per square mile (589.8/km^{2}). There were 424 housing units at an average density of 731.9 per square mile (282.6/km^{2}). The racial makeup of the city was 95.59% White, 3.16% Native American, 0.23% Asian, and 1.02% from two or more races. Hispanic or Latino of any race were 1.36% of the population.

There were 367 households, out of which 29.2% had children under the age of 18 living with them, 54.0% were married couples living together, 5.4% had a female householder with no husband present, and 38.4% were non-families. 34.1% of all households were made up of individuals, and 18.5% had someone living alone who was 65 years of age or older. The average household size was 2.28 and the average family size was 2.99.

In the city, the population was spread out, with 23.1% under the age of 18, 8.6% from 18 to 24, 24.5% from 25 to 44, 20.0% from 45 to 64, and 23.8% who were 65 years of age or older. The median age was 42 years. For every 100 females, there were 85.5 males. For every 100 females age 18 and over, there were 84.6 males.

As of 2000 the median income for a household in the city was $31,103, and the median income for a family was $43,929. Males had a median income of $28,438 versus $18,977 for females. The per capita income for the city was $17,243. About 8.3% of families and 11.0% of the population were below the poverty line, including 17.1% of those under age 18 and 12.6% of those age 65 or over.

== Notable people ==
- Patrick Henry Brady – Medal of Honor recipient for service in the Vietnam War
- Lincoln McIlravy – bronze medalist in wrestling at the 2000 Summer Olympics

== See also ==
- List of towns in South Dakota
