= Smoky Hill City, Kansas =

Ghost town in Ellis County, Kansas

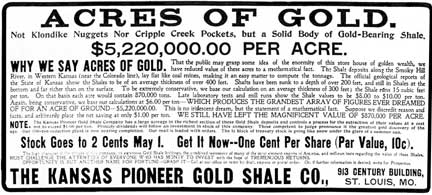
Advertisement for the Smoky Hill gold fraud, circa 1895

Smoky Hill City is a ghost town in Lookout Township, Ellis County, Kansas, United States. It lies approximately 12 miles (19 km) southwest of Hays.

== History ==
The land was bought by Charles K. Holliday of Topeka, and a townsite plat was filed with the county in 1899. Charles Holliday was the son of railroad magnate Cyrus K. Holliday and both father and son believed that the area contained valuable mineral deposits. The town was situated on the north bank of the Smoky Hill River to serve the gold mines that Charles Holliday imagined would spring up to mine the supposed gold-bearing shale along the Smoky Hill River valley.

Holliday began selling town lots. Some of the first residents came from the town of Chetolah, just a few miles down the Smoky Hill River. Chetolah had been founded ten years earlier in the anticipation of a railroad connection that was never built. With the influential Hollidays backing the new town of Smoky Hill City, residents of Chetolah deserted to the new town.

The idea that the shales of along the Smoky Hill River contained valuable minerals started in the mid-19th century as a swindle by Native Americans who said that they knew of tin mines along the Smoky Hill. In the 1890s, prospectors imagined that they found zinc in the shale of Ellis and adjacent Trego County, and then believed that they found gold. The delusion was abetted by unscrupulous assayers, and by swindlers selling secret metallurgical processes to extract gold from the shale. Vigorously warning against the gold delusion was Kansas state geologist Erasmus Haworth, even though the influential promoters threatened to have him fired for his opposition. The Ellis County gold boom sputtered along from 1895 to 1903, by which time (almost) everyone realized that there was no recoverable gold in the shale.

The designation of Smoky Hill City as a townsite was vacated by Ellis County in 1905, at the request of Charles Holliday. The settlement survived for several more years, but was eventually completely abandoned.

== Geography ==
The townsite occupied approximately 540 acres (2.2 km^{2}) in sections 3 and 10 of Township 15 South, Range 20 West of the 6th Principal Baseline and Meridian, 38°45′42.4″N 99°31′55.9″W, elevation 2,000 feet (610 m) above sea level.
