= Hays High School =

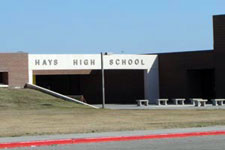
- Entrance of Hays High School

Location
- 2300 E. 13th Street; Hays, Kansas 67601; United States; 38°52′2″N 99°17′42″W

Information
- School type: Public, High School
- Established: 1872
- School board: Board Website
- School district: Hays USD 489
- Teaching staff: 52.05 (FTE)
- Grades: 9 to 12
- Enrollment: 1,013 (2023–2024)
- Student to teacher ratio: 19.46
- Campus: Urban
- Colors: Maroon; Gold; Black
- Athletics conference: Western Athletic Conference
- Mascot: Indian
- Rival: Great Bend High School
- Newspaper: Guidon
- Website: School Website

Hays High School is a coeducational public secondary school located in Hays, Kansas operated by Hays USD 489 school district.

== History ==
=== Early beginnings ===
Hays High School was founded as a school in 1872. A school library was built in 1886 and the school was officially instituted a year later. In 1893, the Alumni Association was formed. During the same year, the first literary society (Alpha) was established. Additional literary societies were established over the next several years. In the early 1890s, bookcases were purchased for use in each classroom. In 1921, many library books were gathered and cataloged according to the Dewey Decimal System. By 1937, the school had over 3,700 volumes and the library held 34 people. The current library has approximately 15,000 books and provides seating for 80. The school newspaper, "The Guidon", began in 1902. The newspapers were available to students for 2 cents each and helped the student body stay informed about issues. The football program began in 1902. The first game was played against Lacrosse High School and resulted in a 5–2 victory. The first yearbook was published two years later in 1904. The baseball and tennis programs also began in 1904. At the time, the tennis program was known as the "Junior Tennis Club". During this time, football and baseball games could only be scheduled for Saturdays, which proved to be inconvenient for the programs and the competing schools.

Manual training was required for all students during the early 20th Century. All students were required to devote at least two hours per week to manual training. This was done through the Hays High Manual Training Department which consisted of planning, fitting and squaring, making crosses and squares, dove-tailing, and wood carving. Twelve benches, a grindstone, and a tool chest were all provided to students.

=== 12th Street era ===
In 1916, a new brick high school building was constructed at 323 W. 12th Street at a cost of $65,000. The building began being used as the new high school in the fall of 1917. In 1925, a new athletic field, known as Shively Field, was purchased for $4,000. The field was named after former superintendent C.A. Shively, who served as superintendent of schools from 1914 to 1928. The original building, located at the corner of 12th and Ash, was torn down in 1939 and an addition was made to the west building. The addition added a vocational agriculture shop, library, chemistry laboratory, home economics laboratory, and a wood shop. In addition, the 12th Street Auditorium was also constructed. Between 1939 and 1941, the school became the Hays Junior-Senior High School, as seventh and eighth grades joined the school. The seventh and eighth grades moved to the newly constructed Hays Junior High School in 1964.

== Extracurricular activities ==
=== Athletics ===
Hays High School has a long and storied athletics history. The Indians have won a total of 19 state championships in various sports. Athletic programs compete in the 5A division according to the Kansas State High School Activities Association and the school is a member of the Western Athletic Conference (WAC). Currently, Hays High offers athletic programs including baseball, golf, soccer, softball, swimming, tennis, track and field, basketball, wrestling, cross country, football, and volleyball.

=== State championships ===
State Championships
Season	Sport/Activity	Number of Championships	Year
Fall	Cross Country, Boys	5	1970, 1971, 1972, 1973, 1976
Winter	Basketball, Boys	1	1944
Spring	Golf, Boys	5	1953, 1978, 1988, 1996, 2016
Spring	Track and Field, Boys	5	1959, 2010, 2011, 2012, 2013
Spring	Track and Field, Girls	1	1989
Spring	Tennis, Girls	3	1976, 1977, 1982
Total		20	

Hays High School offers the following sports:

=== Fall ===
- Football
- Volleyball
- Boys' Cross-Country
- Girls' Cross-Country
- Girls' Golf
- Boys' Soccer
- Girls' Tennis
- Cheerleading

=== Winter ===
- Boys' Basketball
- Girls' Basketball
- Wrestling
- Boys' Bowling
- Girls' Bowling
- Winter Cheerleading

=== Spring ===
- Baseball
- Boys' Golf
- Boys' Tennis
- Girls' Soccer
- Girls' Swimming
- Softball
- Boys' Track and Field
- Girls' Track and Field

=== Non-athletic activities ===
==== Forensics ====
Hays High School earned state championships in 4-Speaker Debate in 1989 and 2-Speaker Debate in 2009. State Speech Championships were obtained in 1987 under coach Henry Wolf and 1994 under coach Jeff Haney.

==== Music ====
Hays High School is known for its music programs such as band and orchestra. Hays High also has various vocal classes and programs available.

===== Chamber Singers =====
The Chambers Singers are Hays High School's premier vocal ensemble. They are currently under the direction of Alex Underwood, and perform and participate in events such as cabaret concerts, Kansas All-State Choir auditions, and Masterworks concerts.

===== Musicals =====
Hays High has performed various musicals annually, including AIDA, Lil' Abner, All Shook Up, and Anything Goes.

== Notable alumni ==
- Alex Delton, former college football player
- Dylan Dreiling, baseball outfielder for the Texas Rangers, 2024 College World Series Most Outstanding Player
- Marj Dusay, actress
- Jaren Kanak, college football tight end for the Oklahoma Sooners
