= Hays USD 489 =

Public school district in Hays, Kansas

Address
- 323 W. 12th St. Hays, Kansas, 67601; United States
- Coordinates: 38°52′27″N 99°19′59″W

District information
- Type: Public
- Grades: PreK to 12

Other information
- Website: usd489.com

Hays USD 489 is a public unified school district headquartered in Hays, Kansas, United States. The district includes the communities of Hays, Schoenchen, Antonino, Catharine, Munjor, and nearby rural areas.

== Schools ==
The school district operates the following schools:

- Hays High School
- Hays Middle School
- Lincoln Elementary School
- O'Loughlin Elementary School
- Roosevelt Elementary School
- Wilson Elementary School

== See also ==
- Kansas State Department of Education
- Kansas State High School Activities Association
- List of high schools in Kansas
- List of unified school districts in Kansas
