= Buckeye Township, Ellis County, Kansas =

Buckeye Township
- Township
- Location in Ellis County
- Coordinates: 39°01′45″N 099°19′51″W
- Country: United States
- State: Kansas
- County: Ellis

Area
  - Total: 136.11 sq mi (352.52 km^{2})
  - Land: 136.03 sq mi (352.32 km^{2})
  - Water: 0.077 sq mi (0.2 km^{2}) 0.06%
- Elevation: 2,156 ft (657 m)

Population (2020)
  - Total: 391
  - Density: 2.87/sq mi (1.11/km^{2})
- GNIS feature ID: 0472439

Buckeye Township is a township in Ellis County, Kansas, United States. As of the 2020 census, its population was 391.

== Geography ==
Buckeye Township covers an area of 136.11 square miles (352.5 km^{2}) and contains no incorporated settlements. According to the USGS, it contains three cemeteries: Hyacinth, Saint Andrew and Saint Severin.

== History ==
A post office was opened at Martin in 1875. The post office was discontinued in 1894. The Martin area was part of Saline Township until 1910, when it passed to Riverview Township, and ultimately was incorporated into Buckeye Township. In 2023, the townships of Ellis County were redrawn. Buckeye Township absorbed Catherine Township and Ellis Township, which became East Buckeye and West Buckeye respectively within the township.
