= Ellis Township, Kansas =

Ellis Township
- Township
- Location in Ellis County
- Coordinates: 39°01′30″N 099°29′46″W
- Country: United States
- State: Kansas
- County: Ellis

Area
  - Total: 176.48 sq mi (457.08 km^{2})
  - Land: 176 sq mi (457 km^{2})
  - Water: 0.035 sq mi (0.09 km^{2}) 0.02%
- Elevation: 2,110 ft (643 m)

Population (2000)
  - Total: 418
  - Density: 2.4/sq mi (0.93/km^{2})
- GNIS ID: 0485300

Ellis Township was a township in Ellis County, Kansas, United States. At the 2010 census, its population was 418.

== History ==
A post office was opened at Halton in 1878. The name was changed to Mendota in 1882. The post office was discontinued in 1909. Until 1910, the Mendota area was part of Hamilton Township. In 2023, the townships of Ellis County were redrawn. Ellis Township was absorbed by Buckeye Township, which became West Buckeye within the township.

== Geography ==
Ellis Township covered an area of 176.48 square miles (457.1 km^{2}) and contained one incorporated settlement, Ellis. According to the USGS, it contained two cemeteries: Mount Hope and Saint Marys.

The streams of East Spring Creek, Tomcat Creek and Wild Horse Creek ran through the township.

== Transportation ==
Ellis Township contained one airport or landing strip, Ellis Landing Field.
