= Ellis County, Kansas =

County in Kansas, United States

- County
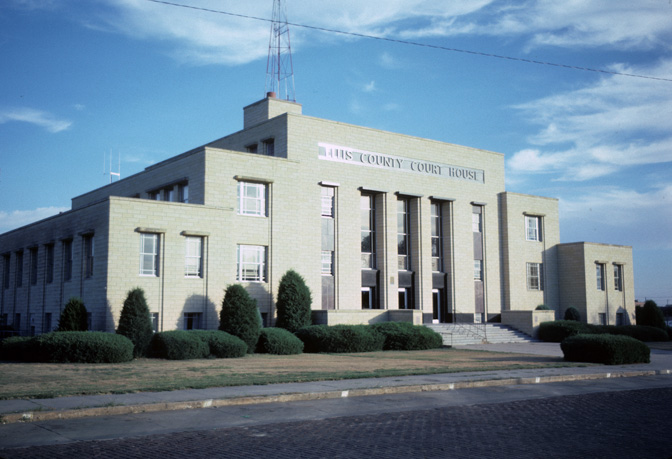
- Ellis County Courthouse in Hays (1979)

- Location within the U.S. state of Kansas
- Country: United States
- State: Kansas
- Founded: 1867
- Named for: George Ellis
- Seat: Hays
- Largest city: Hays

Area
  - Total: 900 sq mi (2,300 km^{2})
  - Land: 899 sq mi (2,330 km^{2})
  - Water: 0.5 sq mi (1.3 km^{2}) 0.05%

Population (2020)
  - Total: 28,934
  - Estimate (2025): 29,075 ▲
  - Density: 32.2/sq mi (12.4/km^{2})
- Time zone: UTC−6 (Central)
  - Summer (DST): UTC−5 (CDT)
- Area code: 785
- Congressional district: 1st
- Website: ellisco.net

Ellis County is a county located in the U.S. state of Kansas. Its county seat and most populous city is Hays. As of the 2020 census, the county population was 28,934. The county was named for George Ellis, a first lieutenant of the Twelfth Kansas Infantry. Ellis County is the official German Capital of Kansas. German immigrants settled in Hays, Ellis, Victoria, and nearby villages in the 1870s and 1880s.

== History ==
=== 19th century ===
In 1854, the Kansas Territory was organized, then in 1861 Kansas became the 34th U.S. state.

Ellis County was established by an act of the state legislature on February 16, 1873, which defined the original borders of the county as:

Commencing where the east line of range 16 west intersects the second standard parallel, thence south to the third standard parallel, thence west to the east line of range 21 west, thence north to the second standard parallel, thence east to the place of beginning.

The first settlers had been arriving since May 1867, with Fort Fletcher (later Fort Hays) having been built in 1865.

Independent county government was established in October 1867, by proclamation of Governor Samuel J. Crawford in response to a petition. Hays was chosen as the permanent seat by an election in April 1870. Early settlers the Lull brothers, from Salina, had in May 1867 begun a town called Rome just north of the railroad route and on the west of Big Creek, expecting that to become the county seat. It gained a general supply store, Bloomfield, Moses & Co, the following month, and a hotel run by Joseph Perry. However, the Big Creek Land Company platted a competing town named Hays City on the east of Big Creek, which gained the important support of the railroad company. Rome disappeared, with Perry's hotel and several other of its buildings being relocated to Hays City.

Ellis County was named for George Ellis, first lieutenant of the Twelfth Kansas Infantry.

The county's early newspapers were the Star-Sentinel, Hays City Times, and Ellis County Free Press published in Hays City; and the Ellis Head-Light and Ellis Review published in Ellis.

==== English and Russian-German immigrants ====
The initial wave of settlement was slow, with three colonies being established in 1872.

George Grant, a wealthy Scottish merchant, purchased 70,000 acres (28,000 ha) of land that year, and some 300 farmers from England settled there over the next two years. Grant bought the land from the Kansas Pacific Railroad with the intention of creating a community of British aristocrats and agriculturalists in the middle of rural Kansas. His first town was Victoria named after Queen Victoria where Victoria Manor, a two story stone structure, acted as temporary housing for the immigrants and as a transport depot for the Kansas Pacific.

Grant's sales pitch to the immigrants was that it was cheaper to buy land in Kansas at US$11 (equivalent to $295.63 in 2025) per acre (Grant himself having purchased it at US$0.88 (equivalent to $23.65 in 2025) per acre) than it was to buy land in Britain, and that Grant would till the land and seed it with imported British stock.

The first wave of young British aristocratic families set sail on April 1, 1873. Stories of the time recorded them as not becoming agriculturalists, as Grant had hoped, but mainly indulging in aristocratic pursuits whilst living off family remittances, including hunting the local wildlife.

Another story recounts them placing a dam across Big Creek to make a lake between Victoria and Hays which they then sailed across in a steamboat until the dam was broken by a flood; although at the time of the Ellis County centennial in the 1970s, one local resident expressed doubts at the historical veracity of this tale, considering the geography of Big Creek in that area.

However, whilst Grant himself put in great effort to start the colony, including importing Black Angus cattle and running his own cattle farm to the south of Victoria, he died in 1878 and after his death all of the British aristocrats returned to Britain.

A plague of grasshoppers in 1874 drove many emigres away, to be replaced in 1875 by many Russian immigrants.

The Russian immigrants were, strictly speaking, Volga Germans who had settled in Russia in 1760. The Russification policies begun in 1871 by Alexander II, and especially the January 13, 1874 reversal of the original decree that had exempted them from conscription into the Russian military when they had settled in Russia in the first place, prompted them to look to the United States and elsewhere.

Five delegates originally went on a ten-day exploratory mission to Nebraska. In December 1874, a four-person delegation went to Topeka and Larned in Kansas, reporting unfavourably on what they found. In the meantime the first Germans had been conscripted in November 1874, spurring many to emigrate anyway, which they did arriving in Baltimore on November 23, 1875 and in Topeka on the 28th of that month.

Initially deterred from homesteading by the US$5 (equivalent to $29.92 in 2025) per acre price of land in North Topeka, they were escorted on three tours of Ellis County by A. Roedelheiner of the Kansas Pacific.

Their initial tour of land around Hog Back almost persuaded the immigrants to return to Russia, but they were shown further land on the Smoky Hill River and near what was to become Catherine and Herzog. This Ellis land was cheaper at US$2.5 (equivalent to $75.59 in 2025) per acre, and so on February 21, 1876 fourteen German families came to Hays and from there moved to Liebenthal in Rush County. Three families from Katherinenstadt in Russia also came to Hays on March 1, 1876 and, whilst temporarily renting accommodation therein, built their homes in Catherine to which they moved on April 8.

Twenty-three families settled in the failing British colony at Victoria on April 8, 1876, settling on the east bank of Victoria Creek just west of where Victoria now exists. Another large wave of immigrants left Russia in June 1876, and some of them arrived in Hays on July 26, 1876 and in Catherine the next day. Others took a different route and arrived and settled in Topeka. Thirteen of the families arrived in Hays on August 20, 1876 and settled in Pfeifer the next day.

One of the largest groups of immigrants was 104 families (originally to be 108, but four had been held back because family members had been conscripted, which legally prevented them from emigrating from Russia) in 1876.

The Mennonites in the group settled in Nebraska, while the others arrived in Victoria on August 3, 1876 and thereafter settled in Herzog. The settlers of Munjor stayed in Herzog for two months, before settling on Big Creek, just north of the present location of Munjor.

A small wave of immigrants followed the first wave to Pfeifer in late September 1876, with another small wave from Katherinenstadt arriving in Catherine on September 26. The last wave of immigrants in 1876 settled in Munjor.

The German immigrants founded Schoenchen in 1877, some coming directly from Schoenchen in Russia, with others coming from Liebenthal in Rush County. Their original plan had been to move from Liebenthal to another site in Rush, but the place that they had chosen was school land that they could not afford, meaning that they could not deed enough of it to the community to erect their church, whilst at the same time land for a church had been deeded in Liebenthal.

In recrimination, the Rush County settlers moved to Ellis, joining the direct immigrant party at Schoenchen in April and May 1877. Two other small waves came that year, one to Catherine on August 6, 1877 from Katherinenstadt, and one to Pfiefer from Pfiefer and Kamenka in Russia.

Immigration began to wane in 1878, with a party from Katherinenstadt arriving on June 20 to settle in Herzog and Pfeifer, and another party from Obermonjour in late July/early August. By this point, property prices had been depressed back in Russia by all of the sales made by the preceding emigrants, and further emigrants were now emigrating at a net loss. Another party, having had to cover the Russian emigration fees through deceit, claiming that two of their number had died to officials who only dealt with the two people who left the train, since the party collectively had not enough money for all even though they had pooled their funds, arrived in Herzog and Munjor and was the last large wave of Volga German immigrants to Ellis.

By 1903, there had been 222 immigrants to Catherine, some going elsewhere afterwards. Munjor grew from 130 families and 794 people in 1897 to 156 families and 931 people by 1900. The largest of the Volga German settlements was Herzog, having roughly 1700 people (measured from church congregation size as accounted in the Victoria Chronicle) in 1895, with Pfeifer and Schoenchen coming fourth and fifth.

=== 20th century ===
In 1942, the Walker Army Airfield was built northwest of Walker. Thousands were stationed at the airfield for training of the Boeing B-29 Superfortress during World War II. The airfield was abandoned and most of it razed.

== Geography ==
According to the U.S. Census Bureau, the county has a total area of 900 square miles (2,300 km^{2}), of which 900 square miles (2,300 km^{2}) is land and 0.5 square miles (1.3 km^{2}) (0.05%) is water.

=== Geology and hydrology ===
The county is crossed by the Saline River across the north, with its principal branch being Eagle Creek. Other rivers include Big Creek, with its principal tributary Victoria Creek, which is in turn a tributary of the Smoky Hill River which flows across the south. The county had several salt marshes in 1886.

The river banks had a lot of limestone, and around Hays City in the 19th century there were great quantities of clay.

=== Adjacent counties ===
- Rooks County (north)
- Osborne County (northeast)
- Russell County (east)
- Rush County (south)
- Ness County (southwest)
- Trego County (west)

=== Major highways ===
- I-70 / US-40
- US-183

=== Airport ===
Hays Regional Airport is located within the county. Used primarily for general aviation, it hosts one commercial airline, United Express, which offers daily jet service to Denver, Colorado.

== Demographics ==
Historical population
Census	Pop.	Note	%±
1870	1,336		—
1880	6,179		362.5%
1890	7,942		28.5%
1900	8,626		8.6%
1910	12,170		41.1%
1920	14,138		16.2%
1930	15,907		12.5%
1940	17,508		10.1%
1950	19,043		8.8%
1960	21,270		11.7%
1970	24,730		16.3%
1980	26,098		5.5%
1990	26,004		−0.4%
2000	27,507		5.8%
2010	28,452		3.4%
2020	28,934		1.7%
2025 (est.)	29,075	▲	0.5%
U.S. Decennial Census; 1790-1960 1900-1990; 1990-2000 2010-2020

The Hays Micropolitan Statistical Area includes all of Ellis County.

In 1886, the population was 5.842, having risen from 5,046 in 1885. In 1910, the population was 12,170.

=== 2020 census ===
As of the 2020 census, the county had a population of 28,934. The median age was 34.1 years. 20.7% of residents were under the age of 18 and 16.4% of residents were 65 years of age or older. For every 100 females there were 98.1 males, and for every 100 females age 18 and over there were 96.3 males age 18 and over. 75.6% of residents lived in urban areas, while 24.4% lived in rural areas.

The racial makeup of the county was 88.4% White, 1.2% Black or African American, 0.3% American Indian and Alaska Native, 0.9% Asian, 0.0% Native Hawaiian and Pacific Islander, 3.4% from some other race, and 5.7% from two or more races. Hispanic or Latino residents of any race comprised 7.0% of the population.

There were 11,853 households in the county, of which 26.1% had children under the age of 18 living with them and 26.6% had a female householder with no spouse or partner present. About 33.4% of all households were made up of individuals and 11.8% had someone living alone who was 65 years of age or older.

There were 13,166 housing units, of which 10.0% were vacant. Among occupied housing units, 62.0% were owner-occupied and 38.0% were renter-occupied. The homeowner vacancy rate was 1.6% and the rental vacancy rate was 11.7%.

=== 2000 census ===
As of the 2000 census, there were 27,507 people, 11,193 households, and 6,771 families residing in the county. The population density was 31 people per square mile (12 people/km^{2}). There were 12,078 housing units at an average density of 13 per square mile (5.0/km^{2}). The racial makeup of the county was 96.10% White, 0.67% Black or African American, 0.21% Native American, 0.82% Asian, 0.02% Pacific Islander, 1.31% from other races, and 0.89% from two or more races. Hispanic or Latino of any race were 2.37% of the population.

There were 11,193 households, out of which 28.80% had children under the age of 18 living with them, 50.00% were married couples living together, 7.80% had a female householder with no husband present, and 39.50% were non-families. 30.10% of all households were made up of individuals, and 10.80% had someone living alone who was 65 years of age or older. The average household size was 2.35 and the average family size was 2.96.

In the county, the population was spread out, with 22.40% under the age of 18, 18.40% from 18 to 24, 25.20% from 25 to 44, 19.60% from 45 to 64, and 14.30% who were 65 years of age or older. The median age was 33 years. For every 100 females there were 95.80 males. For every 100 females age 18 and over, there were 92.60 males.

The median income for a household in the county was $32,339, and the median income for a family was $44,498. Males had a median income of $29,885 versus $21,269 for females. The per capita income for the county was $18,259. About 6.50% of families and 12.90% of the population were below the poverty line, including 9.20% of those under age 18 and 10.00% of those age 65 or over.

== Government ==
=== Presidential elections ===
Presidential election results

United States presidential election results for Ellis County, Kansas
Year	Republican		Democratic		Third party(ies)	
Year	No.	%	No.	%	No.	%
1888	690	44.43%	756	48.68%	107	6.89%
1892	546	33.52%	0	0.00%	1,083	66.48%
1896	460	30.01%	1,051	68.56%	22	1.44%
1900	627	33.55%	1,228	65.70%	14	0.75%
1904	1,009	51.06%	928	46.96%	39	1.97%
1908	768	34.50%	1,421	63.84%	37	1.66%
1912	175	8.22%	1,381	64.87%	573	26.91%
1916	1,186	32.87%	2,335	64.72%	87	2.41%
1920	2,385	75.17%	740	23.32%	48	1.51%
1924	1,763	46.37%	842	22.15%	1,197	31.48%
1928	1,700	33.50%	3,364	66.29%	11	0.22%
1932	1,465	24.54%	4,449	74.52%	56	0.94%
1936	1,622	25.07%	4,834	74.73%	13	0.20%
1940	3,622	52.15%	3,299	47.49%	25	0.36%
1944	3,369	60.13%	2,218	39.59%	16	0.29%
1948	2,676	40.51%	3,863	58.48%	67	1.01%
1952	4,882	65.86%	2,528	34.10%	3	0.04%
1956	4,466	59.33%	3,058	40.62%	4	0.05%
1960	3,156	35.16%	5,815	64.78%	6	0.07%
1964	2,440	30.42%	5,553	69.24%	27	0.34%
1968	3,944	46.72%	3,809	45.12%	688	8.15%
1972	5,463	55.67%	4,113	41.91%	237	2.42%
1976	4,719	41.98%	6,280	55.87%	241	2.14%
1980	5,634	52.54%	3,940	36.74%	1,150	10.72%
1984	7,509	67.65%	3,457	31.15%	133	1.20%
1988	5,194	48.67%	5,289	49.56%	189	1.77%
1992	3,985	32.00%	4,544	36.49%	3,924	31.51%
1996	6,809	56.97%	4,142	34.66%	1,001	8.38%
2000	6,516	58.39%	3,926	35.18%	718	6.43%
2004	7,891	64.75%	4,033	33.09%	263	2.16%
2008	8,207	65.94%	4,010	32.22%	230	1.85%
2012	8,399	71.70%	3,057	26.10%	258	2.20%
2016	8,466	70.86%	2,742	22.95%	739	6.19%
2020	9,758	70.42%	3,737	26.97%	361	2.61%
2024	9,743	72.11%	3,511	25.99%	257	1.90%

Ellis County is an anomaly in western Kansas, having voted several times for Democratic presidential candidates, even when the vast majority of the state's 105 counties went for the Republican nominee. This is due to the county's distinctive (in Kansas) German Catholic heritage, contrasting with the Southern “Bible Belt” or Yankee heritage of most rural Kansas counties. It was the solitary county in Kansas to support Catholic Al Smith over Herbert Hoover in 1928, when Kansas was Hoover's strongest state nationwide, and also was won by John F. Kennedy in 1960 by almost thirty percent as one of only two Kansas counties to back the Massachusetts senator. Ellis County bucked the national and statewide trend by voting for Michael Dukakis over winner George H. W. Bush in the 1988 presidential election, one of only three Kansas counties to go for Dukakis. Ellis County gave a plurality to Bill Clinton over Bush and Ross Perot in the 1992 presidential election, but has been solidly in the Republican column since, giving 66 percent to Republican John McCain to 32 percent for Democrat Barack Obama in the 2008 election, higher than the 57 percent McCain won statewide.

=== Laws ===
Wild Bill Hickok served as sheriff in 1870. Ellis County was a prohibition, or "dry", county until the Kansas Constitution was amended in 1986 and voters approved the sale of alcoholic liquor by the individual drink with a 30% food sales requirement. The food sales requirement was removed with voter approval in 1988.

== Education ==
=== Unified school districts ===
There were 44 school districts by 1886.

- Ellis USD 388
  - western third of county; small portion in extreme eastern Trego County
- Victoria USD 432
  - eastern third of county to Russell county line
- Hays USD 489
  - extends to Rooks and Rush county lines and approximately five miles each way on I-70 from city center

=== Private schools ===
- Holy Family Elementary in Hays
- St. Mary's Elementary in Ellis
- Thomas More Prep-Marian High in Hays

=== Universities and Colleges ===
- Fort Hays State University
- North Central Kansas Technical College

== Communities ==
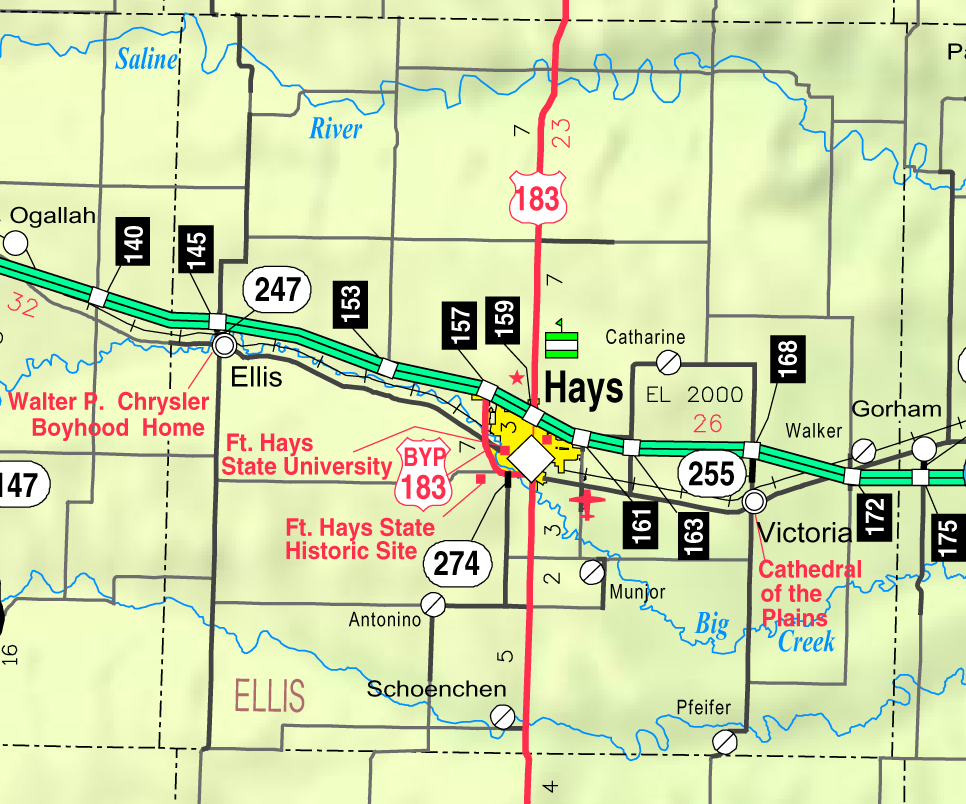
2005 map of Ellis County (map legend)

Many settlements in Ellis are named after the original settlements in Russia from which the Volga Germans immigrated, including Catherine from Katherinenstatd (a.k.a. Baronsk and founded in 1765 by Baron de Beauregard), Shoenchen (a.k.a. Paninskoje and founded in 1767), Pfeifer (a.k.a. Gniluska and founded in 1766), Herzog (founded in 1764), and Munjor from Obermonjour (founded 1766) and Neo-Obermonjour (founded 1859). In 1886, there were twelve post offices in the county: Catharine, Easdale, Ellis, Hays City, Martin, Mendota, Munjor, Palatine, Stockrange, Turkville, Victoria, and Walker.

List of townships / incorporated cities / unincorporated communities / extinct former communities within Ellis County.

=== Cities ===
- Ellis
- Hays (county seat)
- Schoenchen
- Victoria

=== Unincorporated communities ===
† means a community is designated a Census-Designated Place (CDP) by the United States Census Bureau.

- Antonino
- Catharine†
- Emmeram
- Munjor†
- Pfeifer
- Toulon
- Walker
- Yocemento

=== Ghost towns ===
In the 19th and early 20th century there were various communities that no longer exist today:

- Chetolah
- Easdale
- Hog Back
- Mendota in Hamilton Township 20 miles (32 km) north-west of Hays
- Norfolk in Freedom Township 16 miles (26 km) south-east of Hays
- Rome
- Smoky Hill in Smoky Hill Township 15 miles (24 km) south-west of Hays
- Stockrange
- Turkville

=== Townships ===
Ellis County is divided into nine townships. The cities of Ellis and Hays are considered governmentally independent and are excluded from the census figures for the townships. In the following table, the population center is the largest city (or cities) included in that township's population total, if it is of a significant size.

Township	FIPS	Population center	Population	Population density /km^{2} (/sq mi)	Land area km^{2} (sq mi)	Water area km^{2} (sq mi)	Water %	Geographic coordinates
Big Creek	06650		1,798	7 (18)	252 (97)	0 (0)	0.01%	38°52′40″N 99°20′39″W
Buckeye	08950		285	1 (2)	352 (136)	0 (0)	0.06%	39°1′24″N 99°18′25″W
Freedom	24625		125	1 (3)	117 (45)	0 (0)	0%	38°43′48″N 99°7′36″W
Herzog	31525		894	3 (7)	325 (126)	1 (0)	0.18%	38°55′29″N 99°7′19″W
Sources: "Census 2000 U.S. Gazetteer Files". U.S. Census Bureau, Geography Division. Archived from the original on August 2, 2002.

At the start of the 20th century, the townships were: Big Creek, Buckeye, Catherine, Ellis, Freedom, Hamilton, Herzog, Lookout, Pleasant Hill, Saline, Smoky Hill, Victoria, Walker, and Wheatlan.

== Gallery ==
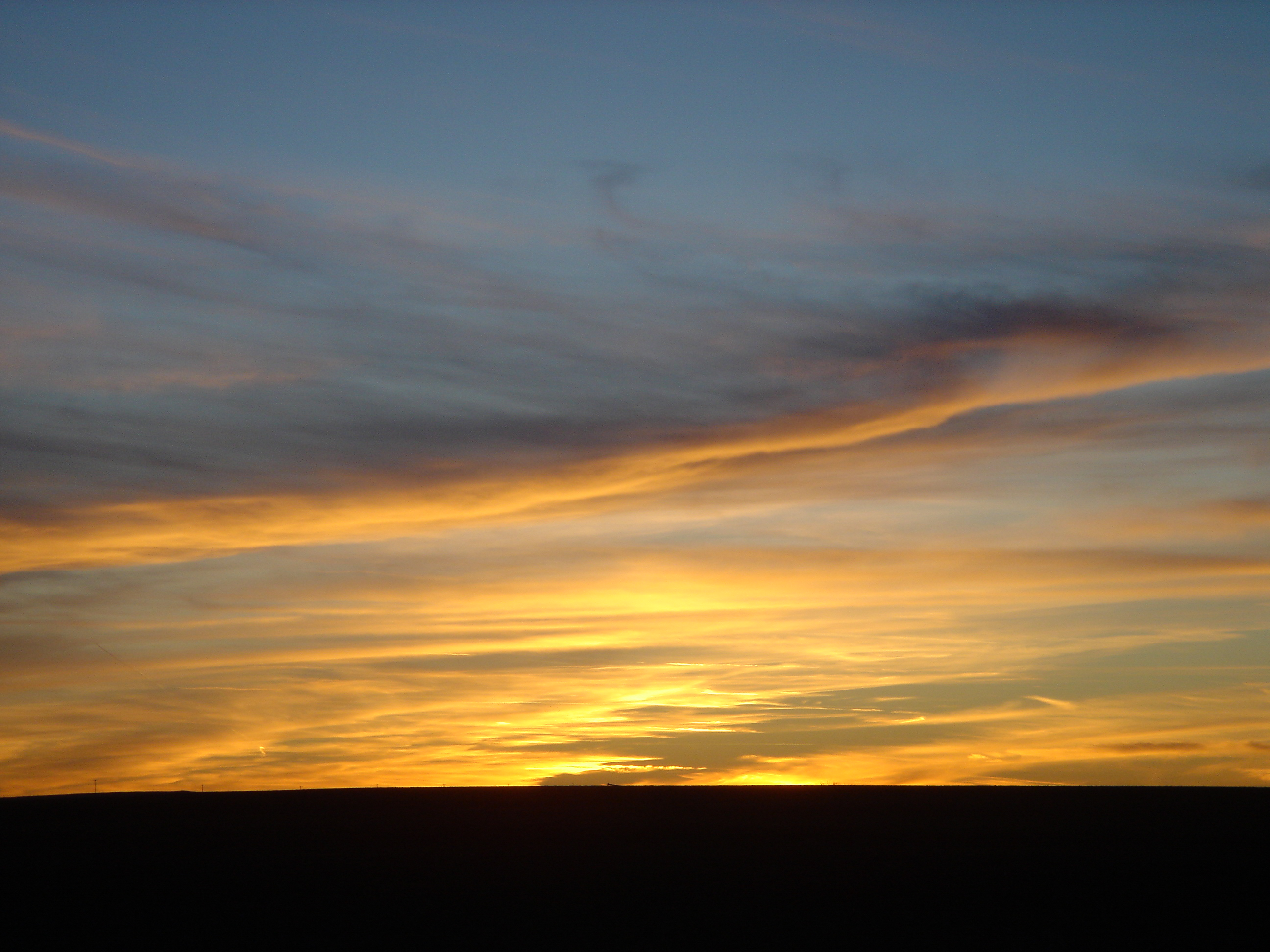

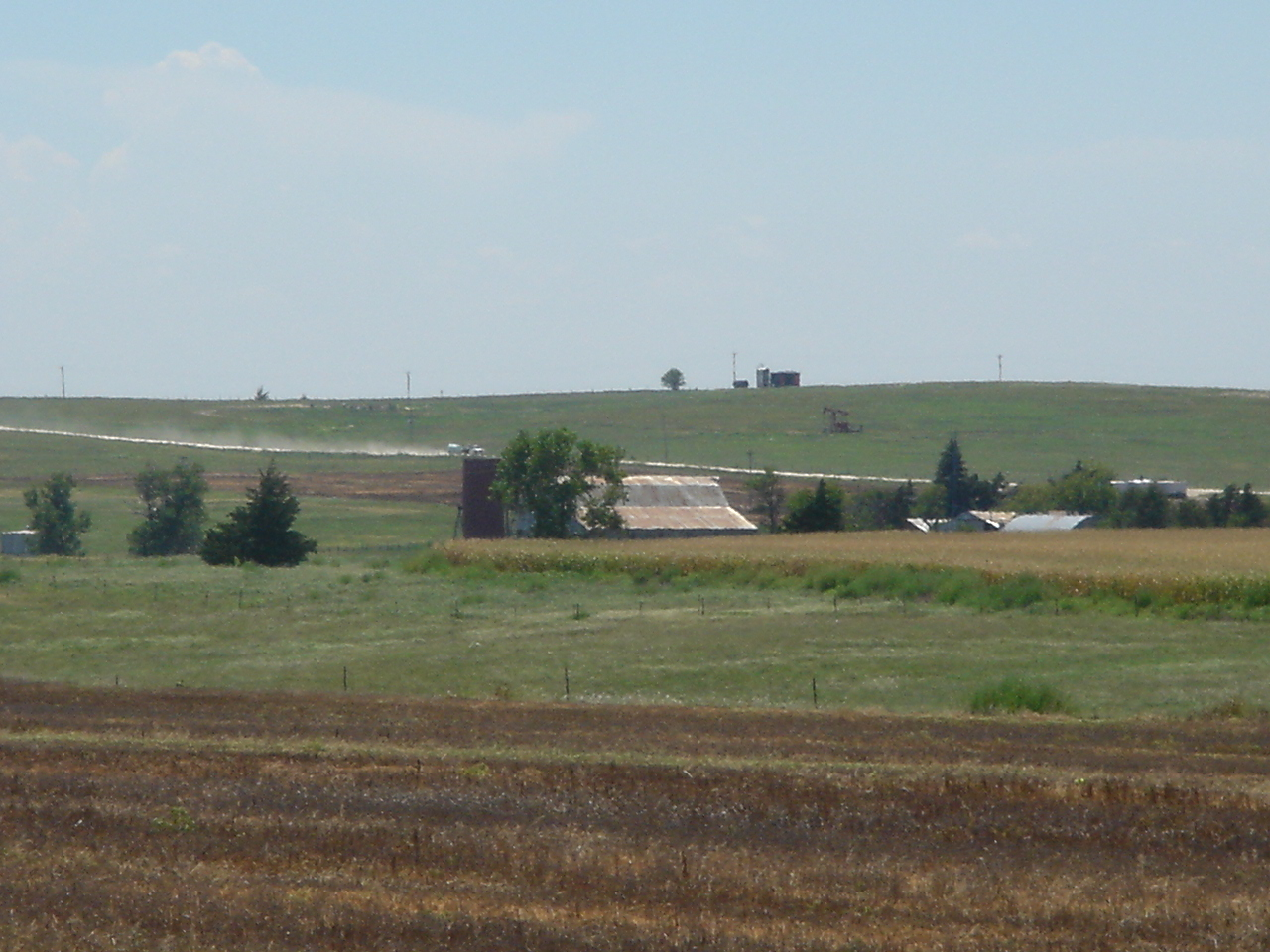

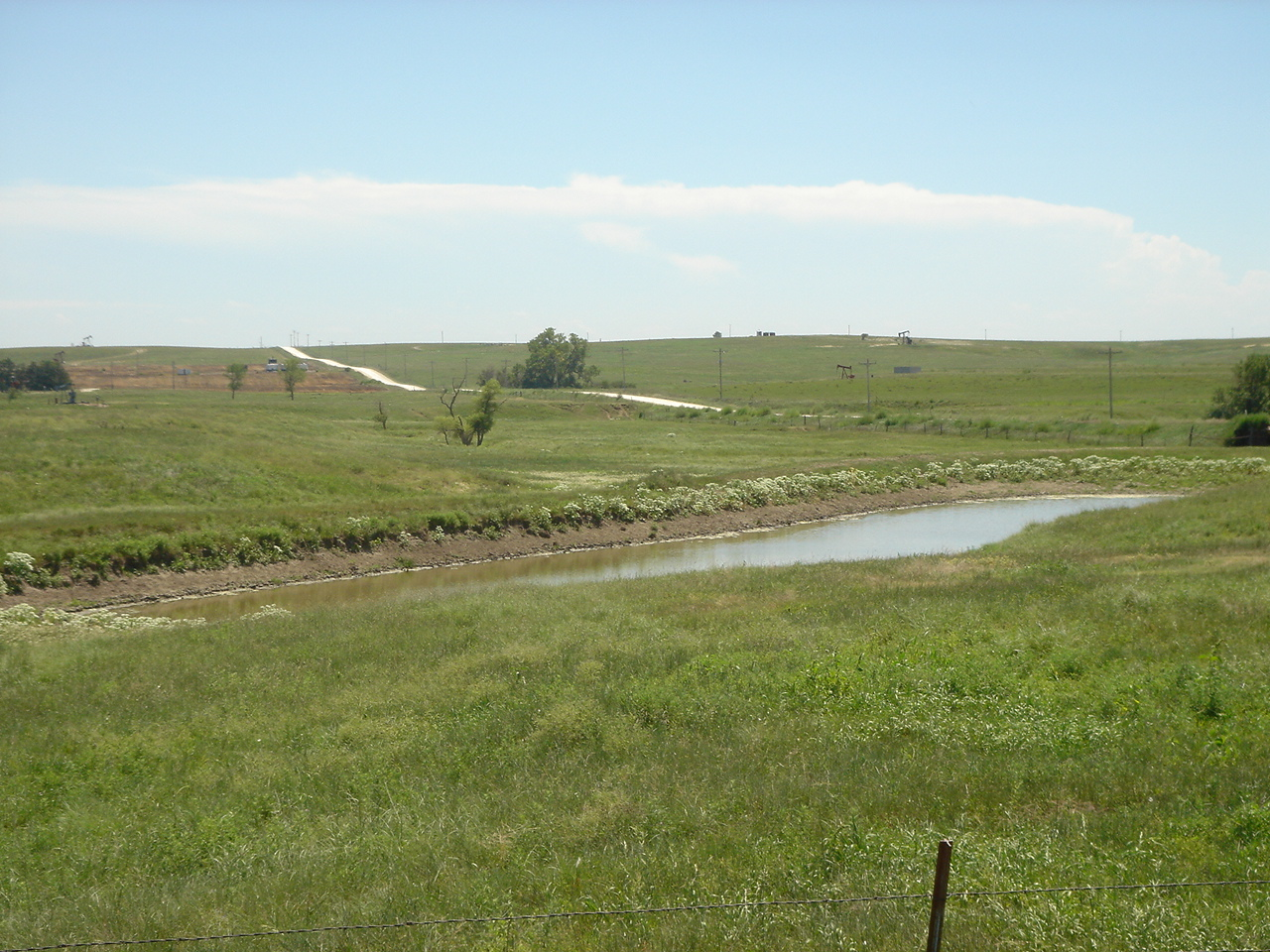

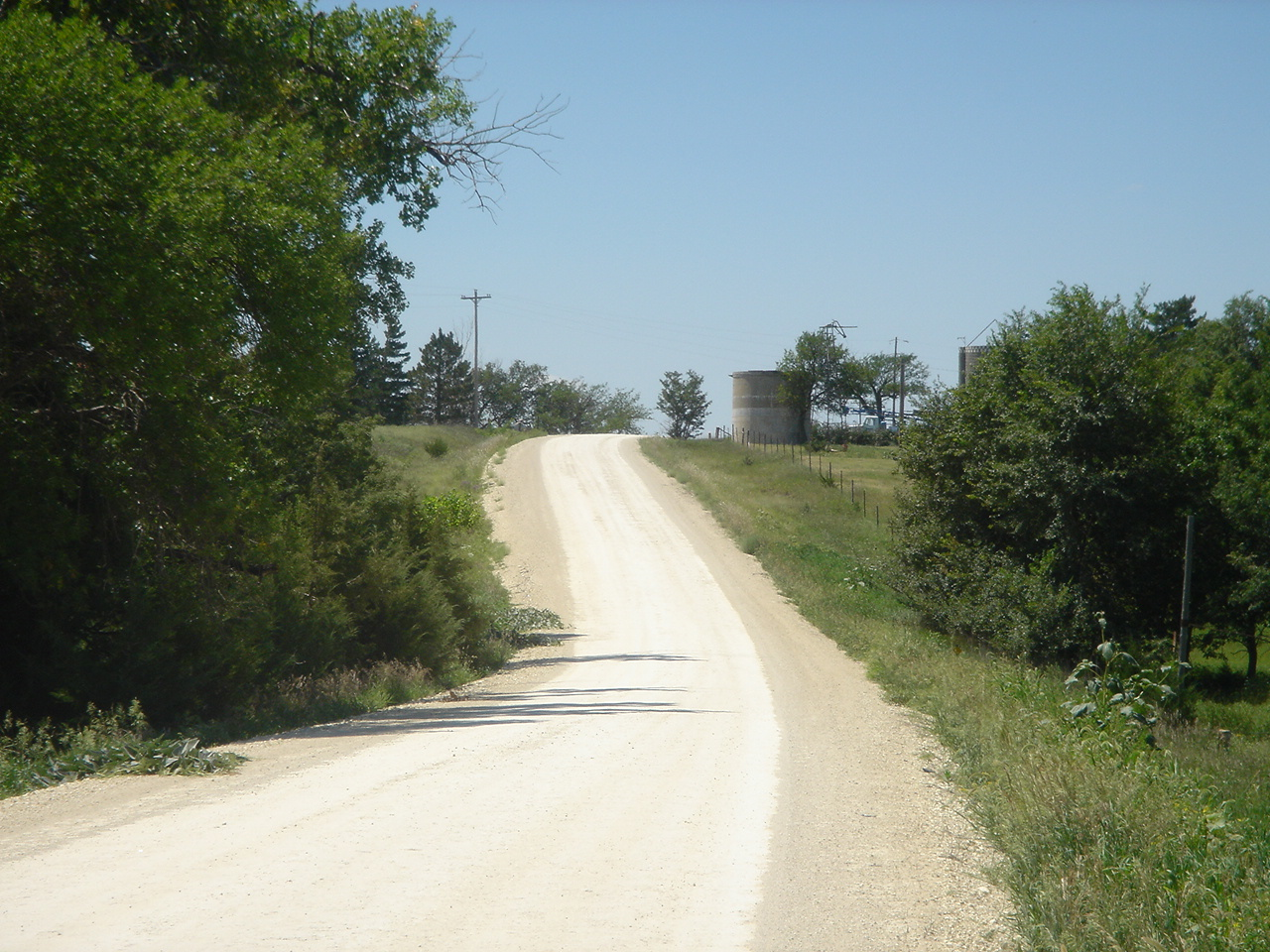

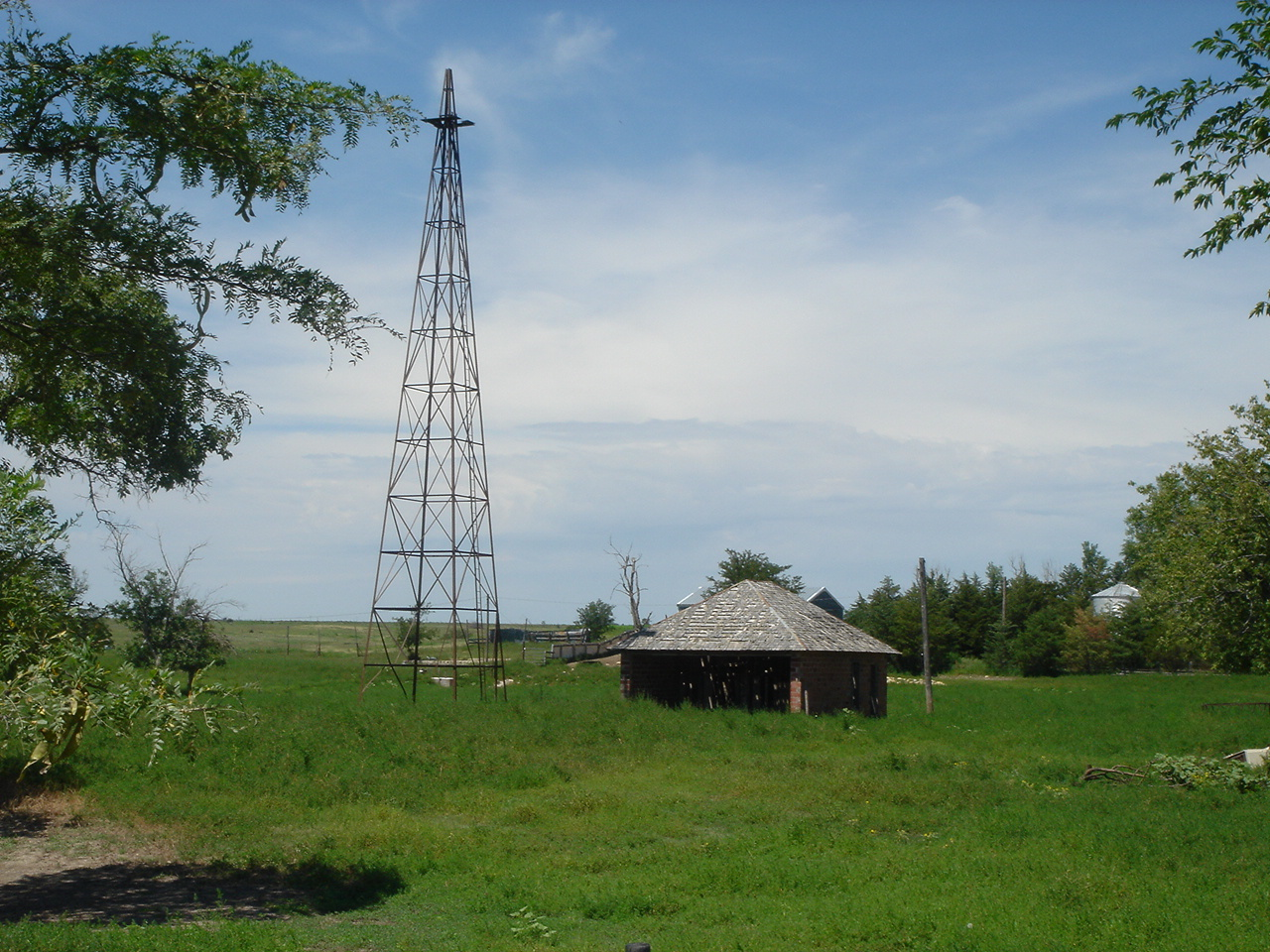

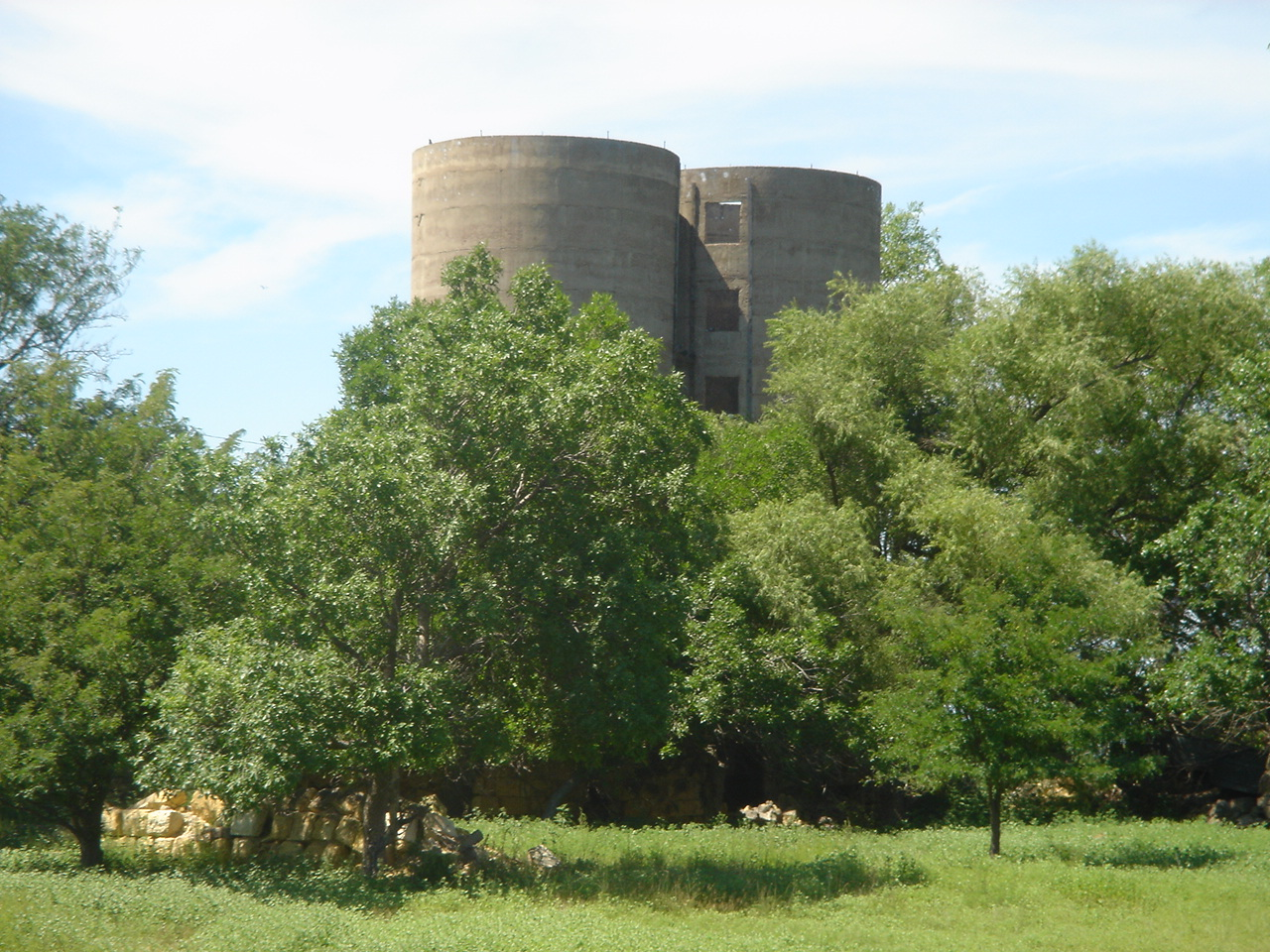

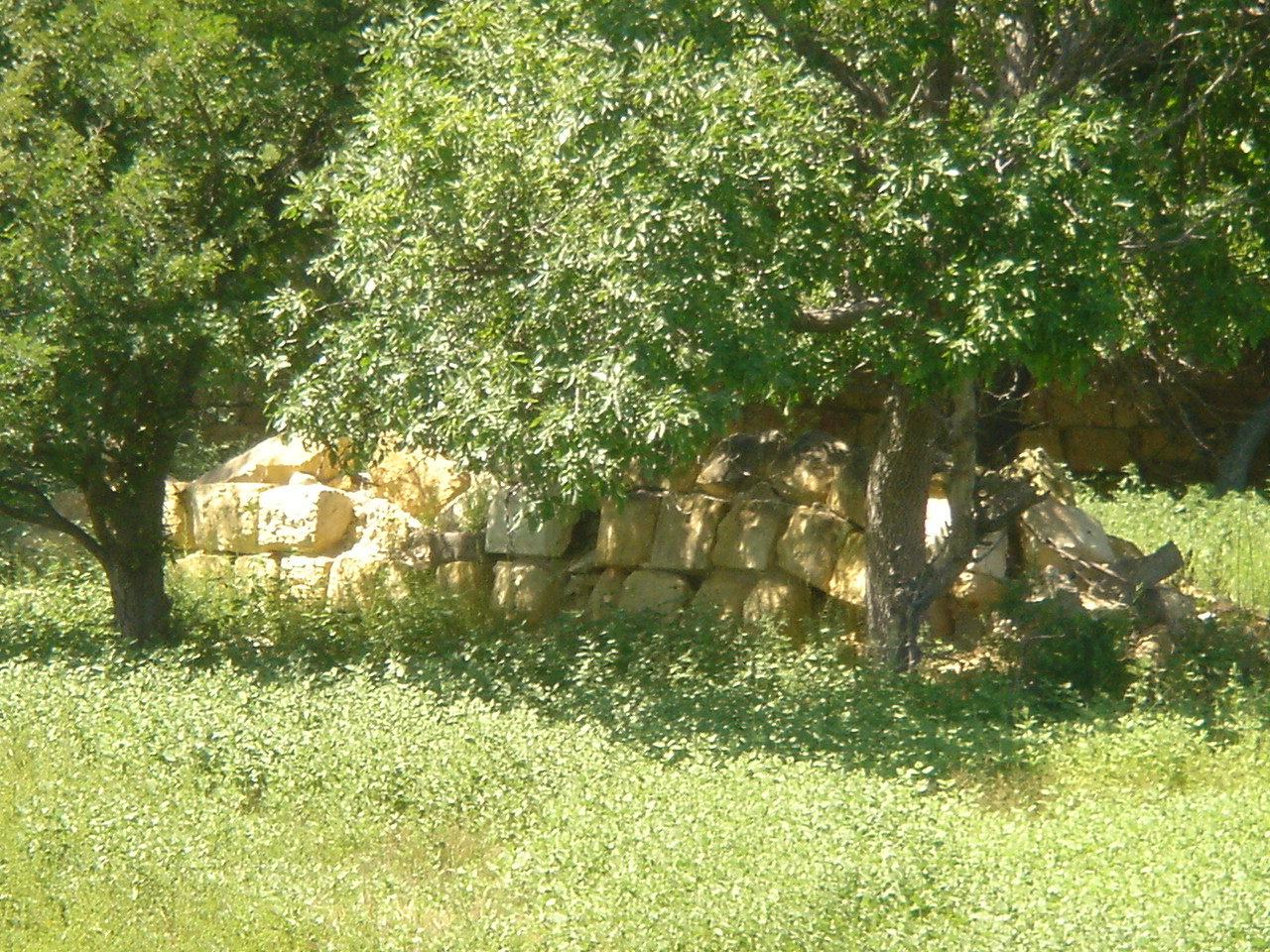

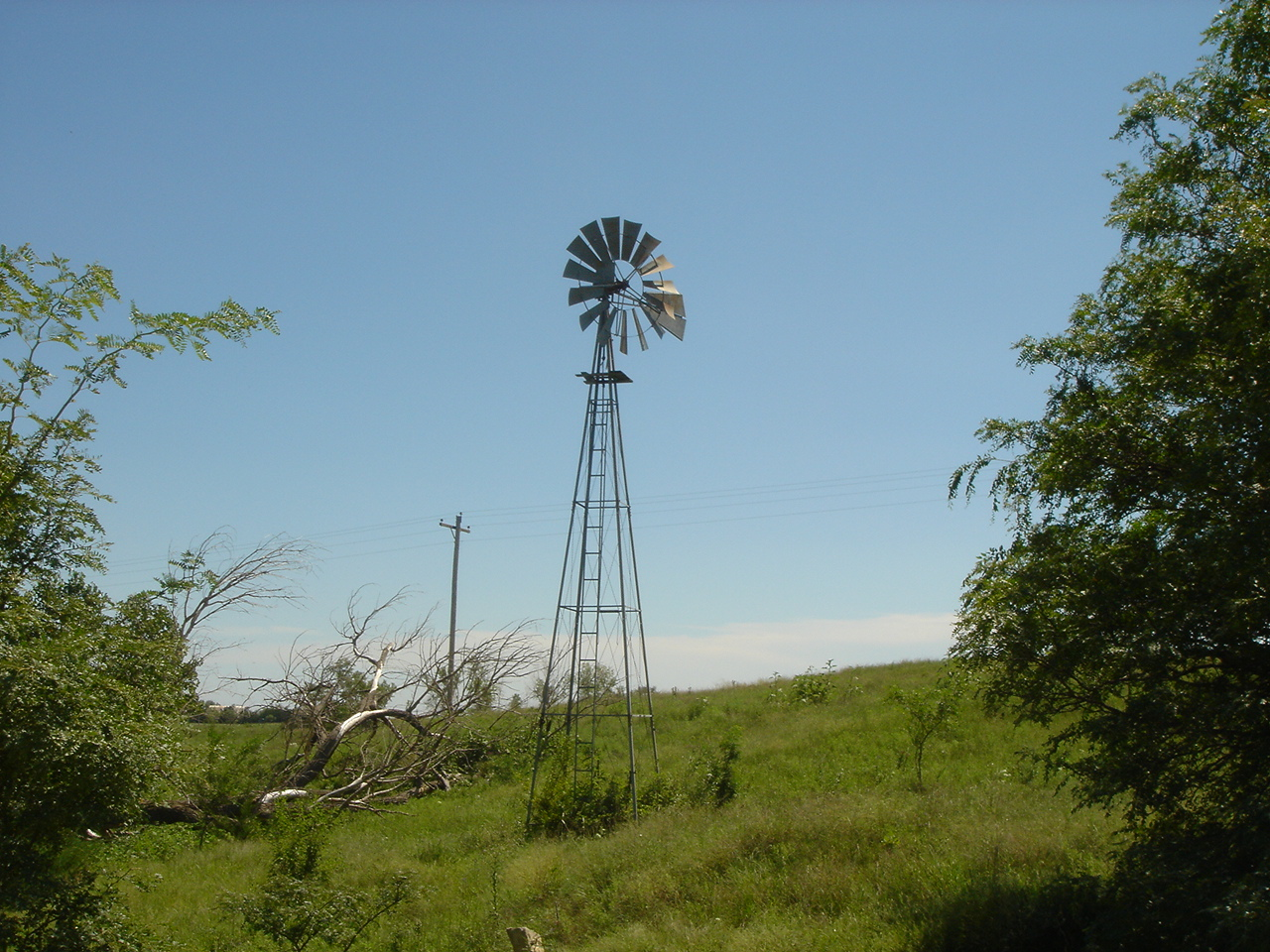

== See also ==
- National Register of Historic Places listings in Ellis County, Kansas
- Walker Army Airfield, an abandoned World War II airfield.

Community information for Kansas

- Kansas locations by per capita income
- List of counties in Kansas
- List of townships in Kansas
- List of cities in Kansas
- List of unincorporated communities in Kansas
- List of ghost towns in Kansas
