= Schoenchen, Kansas =

City in Ellis County, Kansas

- City
- Location within Ellis County and Kansas

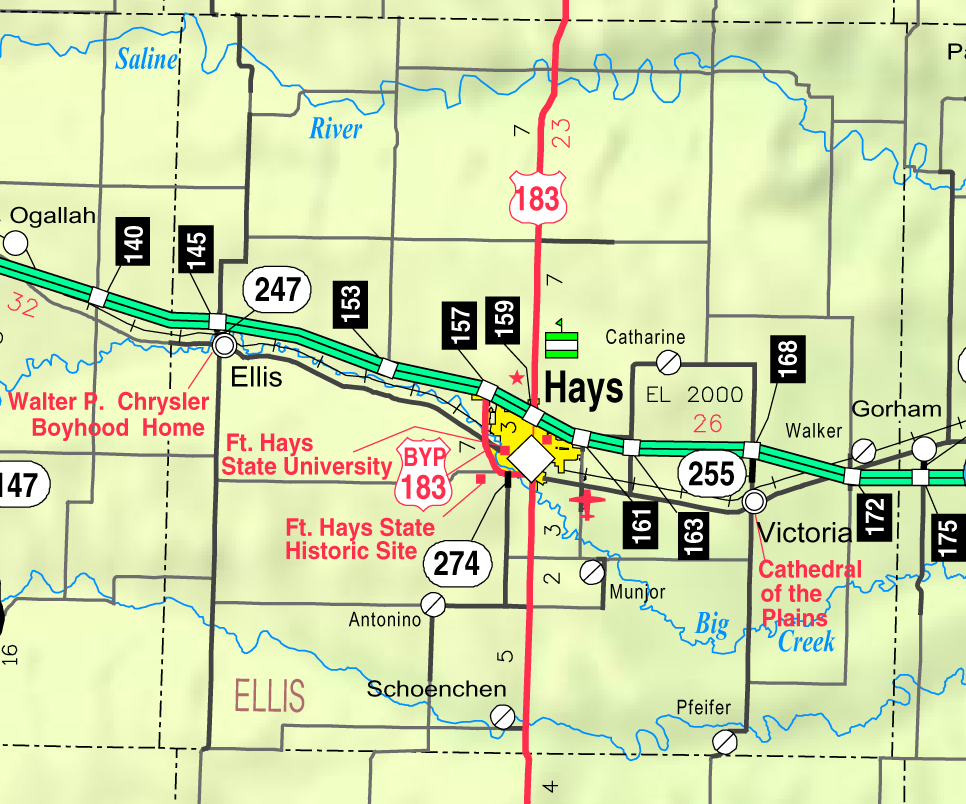
- KDOT map of Ellis County (legend)
- Coordinates: 38°42′46″N 99°19′56″W
- Country: United States
- State: Kansas
- County: Ellis
- Founded: 1877
- Incorporated: 1935
- Named for: Schoenchen, Russia

Area
  - Total: 0.12 sq mi (0.32 km^{2})
  - Land: 0.12 sq mi (0.32 km^{2})
  - Water: 0 sq mi (0.00 km^{2})
- Elevation: 1,923 ft (586 m)

Population (2020)
  - Total: 170
  - Density: 1,400/sq mi (530/km^{2})
- Time zone: UTC-6 (CST)
  - Summer (DST): UTC-5 (CDT)
- ZIP Code: 67667
- Area code: 785
- FIPS code: 20-63425
- GNIS ID: 2396555

Schoenchen is a city in Ellis County, Kansas, United States. As of the 2020 census, the population of the city was 170.

== History ==
Following a dispute over the proposed relocation of nearby Liebenthal, Volga German settlers founded Schoenchen in April 1877. They originally named the community San Antonio, but then renamed it Schoenchen after one of the villages they immigrated from in Russia. The settlers built their first church in 1880, replacing it in 1901 with a permanent structure, St. Anthony Catholic Church, which still stands. The community's first post office opened in 1902.

== Geography ==
Schoenchen is located one-half mile west of U.S. Route 183 and is roughly 11 miles (18 km) south of Hays, the county seat, 137 miles (220 km) northwest of Wichita, and 264 miles (425 km) west of Kansas City.

Schoenchen lies on the south bank of the Smoky Hill River in the Smoky Hills region of the Great Plains. The confluence of the river and one of its tributaries, Lookout Hollow, is immediately northwest of the community.

According to the United States Census Bureau, the city has a total area of 0.11 square miles (0.28 km^{2}), all land.

=== Climate ===
The climate in this area is characterized by hot, humid summers and generally mild to cool winters. According to the Köppen Climate Classification system, Schoenchen has a humid subtropical climate, abbreviated "Cfa" on climate maps.

== Demographics ==
Historical population
Census	Pop.	Note	%±
1940	259		—
1950	170		−34.4%
1960	188		10.6%
1970	182		−3.2%
1980	209		14.8%
1990	128		−38.8%
2000	214		67.2%
2010	207		−3.3%
2020	170		−17.9%
U.S. Decennial Census

=== 2010 census ===
As of the 2010 census, there were 207 people, 76 households, and 59 families residing in the city. The population density was 2,070 inhabitants per square mile (800/km^{2}). There were 86 housing units at an average density of 860 per square mile (330/km^{2}). The racial makeup of the city was 96.6% White, 1.9% American Indian, 1.4% from other races. Hispanics and Latinos of any race were 1.9% of the population.

There were 76 households, of which 36.8% had children under the age of 18 living with them, 63.2% were married couples living together, 1.3% had a male householder with no wife present, 9.2% had a female householder with no husband present, and 22.4% were non-families. 18.4% of all households were made up of individuals, and 3.9% had someone living alone who was 65 years of age or older. The average household size was 2.72, and the average family size was 3.10.

In the city, the population was spread out, with 25.6% under the age of 18, 12.6% from 18 to 24, 23.2% from 25 to 44, 25.6% from 45 to 64, and 13.0% who were 65 years of age or older. The median age was 35.2 years. For every 100 females, there were 107 males. For every 100 females age 18 and over, there were 102.6 males age 18 and over.

The median income for a household in the city was $48,021, and the median income for a family was $48,854. Males had a median income of $34,688 versus $21,250 for females. The per capita income for the city was $19,241. 5.7% of families and 11.3% of the population were below the poverty line, including 15.8% of those under age 18 and 18.8% of those age 65 or over.

== Economy ==
As of 2012, 80.0% of the population over the age of 16 was in the labor force. 0.0% was in the armed forces, and 80.0% was in the civilian labor force with 80.0% being employed and 0.0% unemployed. The composition, by occupation, of the employed civilian labor force was: 29.7% in management, business, science, and arts; 22.7% in production, transportation, and material moving; 22.7% in sales and office occupations; 19.5% in service occupations; and 5.5% in natural resources, construction, and maintenance. The three industries employing the largest percentages of the working civilian labor force were: educational services, and health care and social assistance (22.7%); manufacturing (14.8%); and retail trade (12.5%).

The cost of living in Schoenchen is relatively low; compared to a U.S. average of 100, the cost of living index for the community is 82.8. As of 2012, the median home value in the city was $85,000, and the median selected monthly owner cost was $919 for housing units with a mortgage and $525 for those without.

== Government ==
Schoenchen is a city of the third class with a mayor-council form of government. The city council consists of five members, and it meets on the first Monday after the 10th of each month.

Schoenchen lies within Kansas's 1st U.S. Congressional District. For the purposes of representation in the Kansas Legislature, the city is located in the 40th district of the Kansas Senate and the 110th district of the Kansas House of Representatives.

== Education ==
The community is served by Hays USD 489 public school district.

Schoenchen High School closed in 1966 due to school unification. The Schoenchen High School mascot was Schoenchen Bluejays.

Schoenchen Elementary School operated for several years after the high school closure. The mascot was the Cardinals.

== Infrastructure ==
=== Transportation ===
U.S. Route 183 runs north–south 0.5 miles (0.80 km) east of the city. Schoenchen Road, a paved county road, runs east–west through the city.

=== Utilities ===
Local residents primarily use stored gas for heating fuel.

== Media ==
Schoenchen is in the Wichita-Hutchinson, Kansas television market.

== Culture ==
=== Points of interest ===
The Schoenchen Community Center, housed in a former bar and grill, is the community's polling place and event venue, hosting Schoenchen's annual German Feast.
