= Herzog Township, Kansas =

Herzog Township
- Township
- Location in Ellis County
- Coordinates: 39°01′40″N 099°06′31″W
- Country: United States
- State: Kansas
- County: Ellis

Area
  - Total: 125.85 sq mi (325.95 km^{2})
  - Land: 125.62 sq mi (325.35 km^{2})
  - Water: 0.23 sq mi (0.6 km^{2}) 0.18%
- Elevation: 1,860 ft (567 m)

Population (2020)
  - Total: 839
  - Density: 6.68/sq mi (2.58/km^{2})
- GNIS feature ID: 0472452

Herzog Township is a township in Ellis County, Kansas, United States. As of the 2020 census, its population was 839.

== History ==
In 2023, the townships of Ellis County were redrawn. Herzog Township absorbed Victoria Township.

== Geography ==
Herzog Township covers an area of 125.85 square miles (326.0 km^{2}) and contains no incorporated settlements. According to the USGS, it contains three cemeteries: Sacred Heart, Saint Anna and Saint Fidelis.

The stream of Sweetwater Creek runs through this township.

== Transportation ==
Herzog Township contains one airport or landing strip, Victoria Pratt Airport.
