= Elizabeth Polly =

American hospital matron

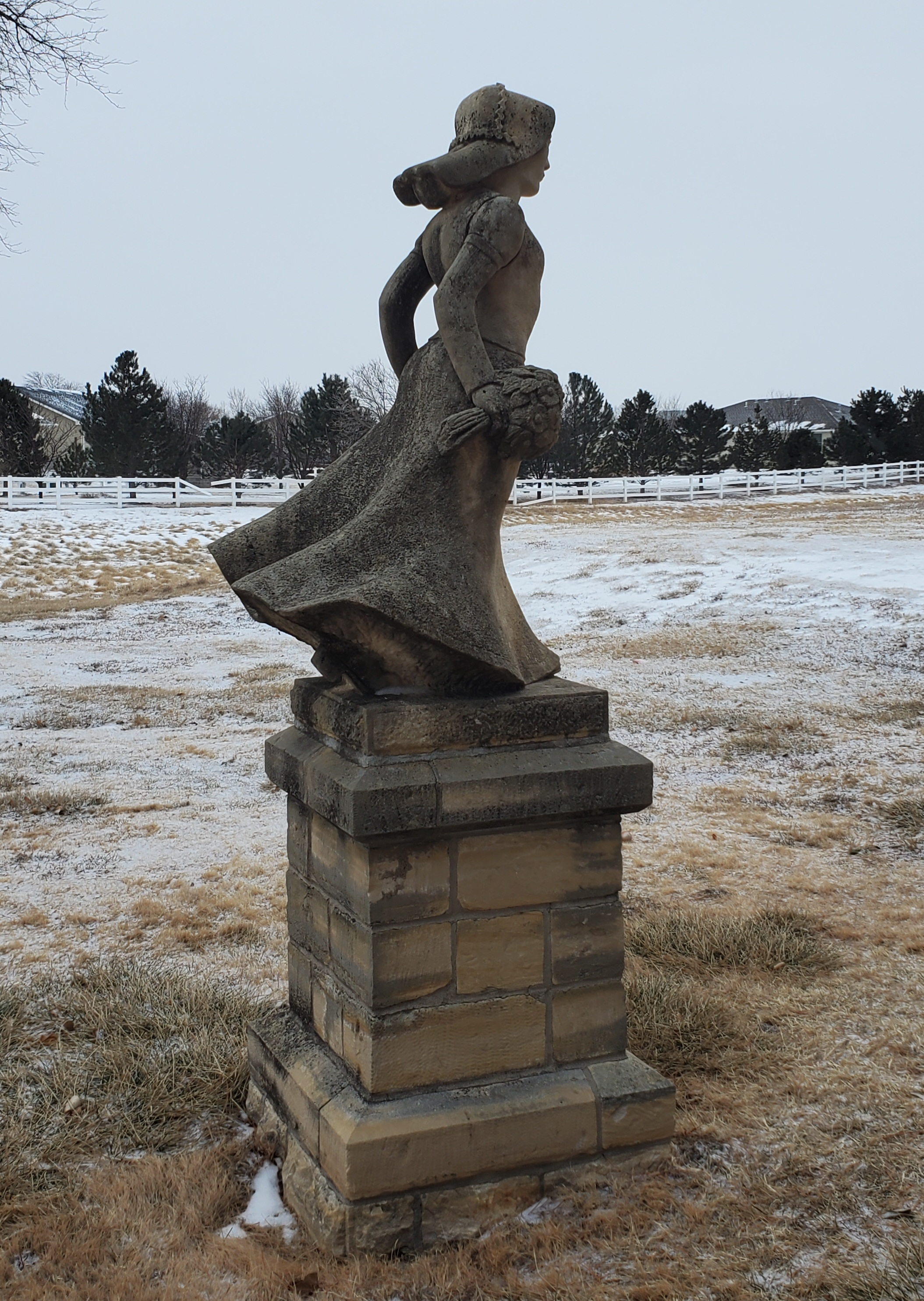
- Peter Felten, Jr.'s portrayal of the walking spirit of Elizabeth Polly. Elizabeth Polly Park, Hays, Kansas.
- Born: Elizabeth Decker c. 1843
- Died: 1867; Fort Hays
- Other name: Blue Light Lady
- Occupation: Hospital matron
- Known for: Treating dying soldiers and haunting Sentinel Hill

Elizabeth Polly is traditionally the name of a beloved hospital matron at Fort Hays, Kansas, an "angel of mercy" during the cholera outbreak of 1867 who also died of the disease. Local legend has it that her ghost is still seen walking the area.

== Service and death ==
In 1867, Fort Hays was established on a low slope south of Big Creek, its role being to provide security for the Smoky Hill Trail. For the most part, the "fort" was still just a bivouac of hundreds of tents in the late summer of 1867 when it became the center of a war with the plains tribes over the construction of the Kansas Pacific Railway parallel to the trail.

Ephraim Edward Polly was a Civil War veteran who enlisted in the 1st Colorado Cavalry Regiment on Sept 11, 1861. Ephraim separated from the Army on Aug 23, 1865, and then, around age 24-25, reenlisted as a hospital steward, or male nurse. He served in that position in the early months of the U.S. Army encampment at the newly established Fort Hays.

With the maiden name Decker, Elizabeth is identified as Ephraim Polly's wife from a c. 1864 marriage. As would be common for wives of hospital stewards, Elizabeth served as a hospital matron.

By August 1867, a cholera epidemic had broken out among the tents of over 1000 troops. The cholera soon spread to the 1200 railroad construction workers who were sheltering near the camp in the new village of Rome, fearing attack from the Cheyenne Dog Soldiers.

Elizabeth sought to help the sick and dying soldiers deal with what were, for many, their final hours. Often in the evening she would walk to the high limestone bluff a mile and a half southwest of the fort, now known as Sentinel Hill, where she is said to have found some comfort and solace.

When it was apparent that she had contracted the disease herself, she pleaded with her husband to bury her on top of that hill. Upon her death, soldiers were detailed to dig her grave on the crest of Sentinel Hill; but only inches beneath the sod they struck massive limestone bedrock. Unable to dig a grave on top of the hill, the sorrowful soldiers instead buried her on a lower slope nearer to the fort. Given a military funeral, her burial clothing was the uniform she wore while caring for the suffering, a blue dress and a white bonnet.

Mr. Polly continued in Hays City as a pharmacist for a few years and remarried. Leaving Hays in 1873, Ephraim Polly purchased a Texas Panhandle ranch to operate as a trail station on the military road between Fort Supply and Fort Elliott, and he was elected the first Judge of Hemphill County, Texas.

== "The Lonely Grave" ==
A long-standing mystery in the county is the location of Elizabeth's supposed lost grave.

One tradition for her gravesite is that there was no tombstone, possibly only two wooden planks, barely readable years later, from which was reportedly read her name (Elizabeth), her birth date (1843), and her birthplace, (Liberty). From the idea that Elizabeth came from Liberty, Missouri, comes a story that a decade after her death, her grave was inspected by an incognito visitor from Liberty, Jesse James, presumably on behalf of Elizabeth's surviving relatives. That the grave had no durable markers suggests a reason her grave was lost.

Another tradition holds that her gravesite was lost because it was marked by four limestone posts, supposedly stolen by a matching number of four thieves. The legend claims that tragedy found each of the thieves in the hours after the theft: one felled in a gunfight, two killed in a carriage accident, and the other hit by a train. If the grave was indeed marked by posts made from the particular bedrock limestone from "Elizabeth's Hill", the soldiers would not have been aware that Fort Hays Limestone posts crumble and rot away in a number of years.

Regardless of how her grave may have been marked, the site would have been separate from the military reservation and not within the fort's military and civilian cemeteries. When the fort was closed 22 years later, the soldiers' remains were relocated to Fort Riley or Fort Leavenworth, while civilian graves were moved to the north of Hays City, but no known grave for Elizabeth Polly was moved.

Multiple attempts to locate her gravesite have been made. While multiple bodies have been exhumed from the farms and ranch land surrounding the hill, none was conclusively shown to be that of Elizabeth Polly. Some contend that a particular grave found at the base of the hill was not Polly's, being instead that of a Mexican cattleman, based on the marker's Spanish inscription. In fact, the "Lonely Grave," as it is called, may not be an actual burial site at all, as no remains were found in attempts to fulfill Miss Polly's wishes by moving her to the top of the hill.

== Blue Light Lady ==
She's up there on that hill somewhere
'tho her grave has long been lost
And her rest is disturbed, for she walks without a word
Among us -- who count her cost

— Bob Maxwell, Ballad of Elizabeth Polly

Around the community of Hays, Elizabeth Polly is known as the "Blue Light Lady." Her spirit is said to still walk Sentinel Hill, also called Elizabeth Polly Hill and Blue Light Lady Hill, looking for soldiers to comfort or to find her peace at the hilltop.

Some tales say that she walks the hills holding a blue lantern, which if you look into you become one of the spirits trapped inside. Many people have made attempts to witness her spirit firsthand. Some have claimed that she has appeared wearing a blue, prairie-style dress and bonnet, while others claim that she is a misty blue light. Other people have claimed that while waiting at the top of the hill for Elizabeth's spirit to arrive, footsteps have been heard walking up the hill and suddenly disappearing at the top, yet nobody was to be found around the hill.

A particular event was reported in 1950 when a police officer radioed a report to dispatch saying that he had just hit a woman dressed in blue on the road between Big Creek and the old fort. He quickly exited his car and searched for a body, but found none.

== Memorials ==
- A pyramid monument of local stonepost limestone was erected atop the Sentinel Hill gravesite a century after her death (1967-1968) by Peter Felten, Jr., sponsored by the Saturday Afternoon Club, the Fort Hays Nurses Club, and the local chapter of the Kansas State Nurses Association.
- Elizabeth Polly Park was established by the city of Hays in 1982, featuring the Peter Felten, Jr., sculpture Elizabeth Polly.
