= Battle of the Saline River =

Battle during the American Indian Wars within Kansas

- Part of the American Indian Wars
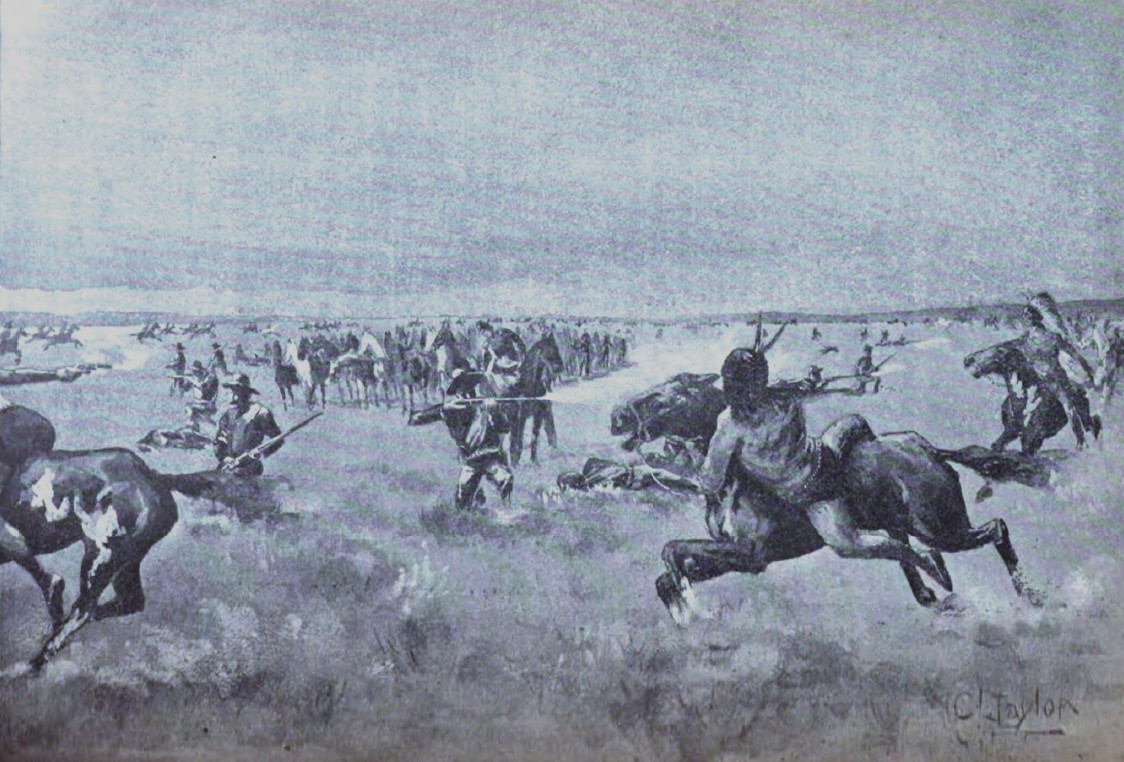
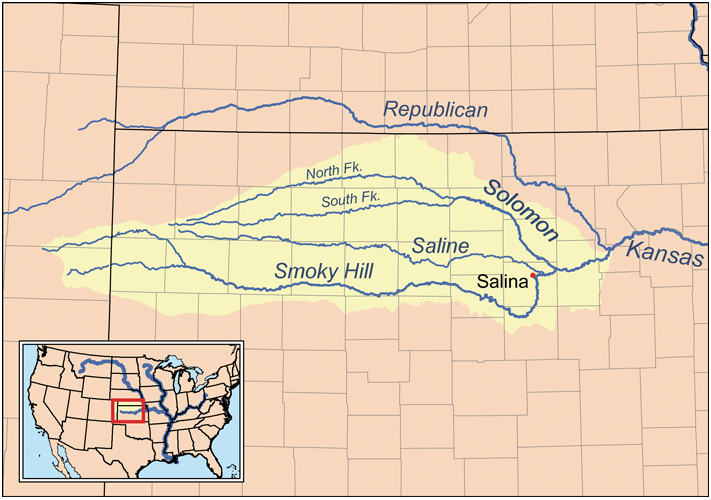
- Wounded and lifted on Horse, a painting by C. Taylor from the book Ups and Downs of an Army Office, George Augustus Armes' autobiography. The painting describes when the then Captain Armes was wounded in the hip and lifted up on a horse during the Battle of the Saline River, August 2, 1867. A map of the Smoky Hill River drainage basin in the central Great Plains of North America, State of Kansas, that includes the Saline River. These forks with the Republican River form the Upper Forks of the Kansas River over which several excursions and battles ranged, 1867-1869.
Date	August 2, 1867
Location	Ellis County, Kansas
Result	Inconclusive

Belligerents
United States	Cheyenne

Commanders and leaders
(United States) Cpt G. A. Armes; William Cody, scout	Tall Wolf (son of Medicine Arrows)

Units involved
(United States) Co F, 10th Cav	Dog Soldiers

Strength
34 cavalry	350–400 warriors or more

Casualties and losses
1 killed several wounded 6 cases of cholera	6 killed Unknown wounded

The Battle of the Saline River in the beginning of August, 1867, was one of the first recorded combats of the Buffalo Soldiers of the U.S. 10th Cavalry. This battle occurred 25 miles northwest of Fort Hays in Kansas on August 2.^{[see discussion]}

== Prelude ==
In the summer of 1867, with realization that the Union Pacific railroad construction in Nebraska would reach Fort Laramie before the Kansas Pacific Railway, and the request of the Denver community for a railroad connection, the route of the Kansas Pacific Railway was diverted from the course of the Republican River to the Smoky Hill River. This was considered a trespass to the Cheyenne and Kiowa claims to Buffalo hunting in western Kansas, who began general raids on the railroad construction and settlers along the new route.

On August 1, Cheyenne warriors under Tall Wolf, son of Medicine Arrows, attacked and killed a party of railroad workers at Campbell's Camp in eastern modern Ellis County. As the narrowly senior officer at the months-old new Fort Hays, then little more than a bivouac, Cpt Henry Clark Corbin dispatched Cpt George Augustus Armes to the camp with Armes' command of 47 troopers of Company F, 10th Cavalry. Cpt. Armes found the slain Campbell's Camp workers in the late afternoon of August 1. Armes attempted an immediate pursuit to the north but soon returned to the camp to request reinforcements.

== Battle ==
Later in the morning of the 2nd August, without reinforcements and leaving 4 men sick with cholera and some guards and messengers, Armes and 34 troopers followed the active "hostile indian" trail north from Campbell's Camp to the Saline River. Following the Saline River several miles west, the cavalry was surrounded by about 400 horse-mounted Cheyenne warriors. Armes formed a defensive infantry style "hollow square" with the cavalry mounts in the center. Seeking better defensive ground, Armes walked his command south toward Fort Hays while maintaining the defensive square. After 8 hours of combat, 2,000 rounds of defensive fire and 15 miles of movement in the square, the Cheyenne disengaged and withdrew as the troopers gained a bluff in sight of the fort. Company F, without reinforcements, concluded 113 miles of movement during the 30-hour patrol, riding the final 10 miles east back to Fort Hays with only one trooper killed in action. Captain Armes commented later, "It is the greatest wonder in the world that my command escaped being massacred." Armes credited his officers for a "... devotion to duty and coolness under fire."

== Aftermath ==
Captain Armes was earnest in locating what he thought was the main Indian village on the Solomon Folks and recovering the large numbers of stolen horse stock he expected to be held there. However, his convalescence kept him unable to ride in the saddle for a couple of weeks. When released from bed rest, his service was limited to riding in his personal carriage up the line to reassure the construction workers. As soon as he could ride, about two weeks later, he led his command to the Solomon Folks in coordination with the 18th Kansas Volunteer Cavalry. Contact with larger numbers of Indians led to the Kansas Battle of Prairie Dog Creek and the (1st) Battle of Beaver Creek. Although casualties were light, the U.S. and Kansas forces withdrew to the railroad for the fall and winter and the seeming U.S. retreat from these battles did not discourage the Cheyenne and Kiowa for the time being.

Even so, the Medicine Lodge Treaty would be signed within a month, but soon broken. It was not until General Sheridan's winter campaign of 1867-68, including the Battle of Washita River, that Indian resistance within the state was broken and the railroad construction secured. Other battles continued after 1868, such as the ones near Sterling, Colorado (the Battle of Summit Springs) and near Cheyenne, Oklahoma, but the fighting in the upper forks of the Kansas River was over.

The last Indian battle in the State of Kansas took place on September 27, 1878. It was known as "Battle of Punished Woman's Fork" or "Battle of Squaw's Den Cave."

== See also ==
- Buffalo Soldiers
- List of battles fought in Kansas
- Military history of African Americans
