= Fort Wallace =

US cavalry fort in Kansas

- near Wallace, Kansas
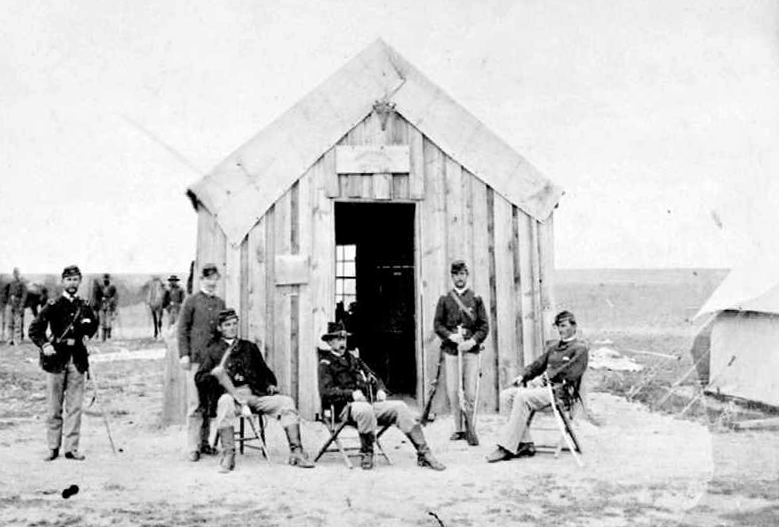
- Officers at Fort Wallace in 1867, including Theophilus H. Turner, who discovered Elasmosaurus in the area the same year, second from the left

Site information
- Type: Military base
- Controlled by: United States
- Condition: Dismantled

Location
- Location in Kansas
- Location within Kansas Location within the United States
- Coordinates: 38°54′18″N 101°33′34″W

Site history
- Built: 1865
- Built by: U.S. Army
- In use: 1865-1882
- Demolished: 1886

Garrison information
- Garrison: 2nd Cavalry Regiment; 5th Infantry Regiment; 6th Infantry Regiment; 7th Cavalry Regiment; 9th Cavalry Regiment
- Occupants: George Custer; George Forsyth

Fort Wallace (c. 1865–1882) was a US Cavalry fort built in Wallace County, Kansas to help defend settlers against Cheyenne and Sioux raids and protect the stages. It is located on Pond Creek, and it was named after General W. H. L. Wallace. There were accommodations for 500 men and the troops were scattered between Fort Hays and Fort Denver.

All that remains today is the cemetery, but for a period of over a decade Fort Wallace was one of the most important military outposts on the frontier.

== Fort Wallace Museum ==
Today, Fort Wallace is represented by a privately operated museum nearby in the town of Wallace, with relics from the fort as well as photos, reproduction items, and literature covering the post's history and the settlement of the Great Plains. A casting of the plesiosaur Elasmosaurus discovered by Turner and Scout William Comstock is also on display. Facades of some of the buildings from Fort Wallace and from the Old Town of Wallace are featured in the Milford Becker Addition opened in 2017.

== Location ==
The old Fort Wallace cemetery still exists, and is located next to the Wallace Township Cemetery at 38°54′23″N 101°33′36″W.

== Other uses ==
Fort Wallace is also a fort in the game Red Dead Redemption 2.
