= Smoky Hill Trail =

Historical American trail

Route information
- Length: 592 mi (953 km)
- Existed: 1855; 170 years ago–1870

Major junctions
- East end: Atchison, Kansas
- West end: Denver, Colorado

Location
- Country: United States

Highway system

The Smoky Hill Trail ran through the Smoky Hills, in central Great Plains of North America, and was in use from 1855 to 1870. Before American colonization, the land along the Smoky Hill River was favored hunting ground for the Plains Indians, and had an ancient American Indian trail. This gave rise to the establishment of the Smoky Hill Trail across what was then Kansas Territory. It extended west from Atchison, Kansas to the Kansas River, then along the Smoky Hill River, and finally to Denver, spanning the width of what became the state of Kansas and the eastern portion of Colorado. The trail was named after the Smoky Hill River, whose course it paralleled for much of its length.

In 1859, the Pike's Peak Gold Rush prompted increased exploration of the westward path from the Missouri River through the dangerously vast Kansas Territory prairie. Emigration by gold prospectors was enticed greatly by a deluge of newspaper articles with wild claims of efficiency and natural provisions of the Smoky Hill Trail. These were especially published in towns competing as Smoky Hill Trail launch stations for the gold rush. Several routes were explored by individual emigrant parties. Many who attempted the Smoky Hill Trail got repeatedly lost from it or found no natural provisions, contrary to the published reports and guidebooks, culminating in one infamous case of cannibalism. The Rocky Mountain News said "for the benefit of speculators and lot owners, in prospective towns along the line of travel, has been tried once over this fated Smoky Hell route with only too lamentable success, and its instigators stand to-day, in the sight of Heaven, guilty of manslaughter, to say the least".

In 1860, a few officially organized expeditions were sponsored by a collective fundraiser among the city of Leavenworth and various towns along the Kansas Valley and the Kansas River. The resulting road and guide reports were far too late, because the Pike's Peak Gold Rush embarkment traffic had peaked in 1859, was substantial in 1860, and was depleted by 1861. The official road-building expedition's markers were already eroding due to wild buffalo migration by then.

The Smoky Hill Trail continued as a path westward for American settlers, while considered the forerunner of an impending railroad. Beginning in 1865, the trail was the route for the short-lived Butterfield Overland Despatch serving freight and passengers. To protect travelers, the United States Army established several forts along the trail, including Fort Downer, Fort Harker, Fort Hays, Fort Monument, and Fort Wallace. In 1867, the Comanche and the Kiowa, and in 1868, the Sioux and the Arapaho signed treaties withdrawing their opposition to the construction of a railroad along the Smoky Hill River. The Kansas Pacific Railway was completed in 1870, rendering the Smoky Hill Trail obsolete.

== Gallery ==
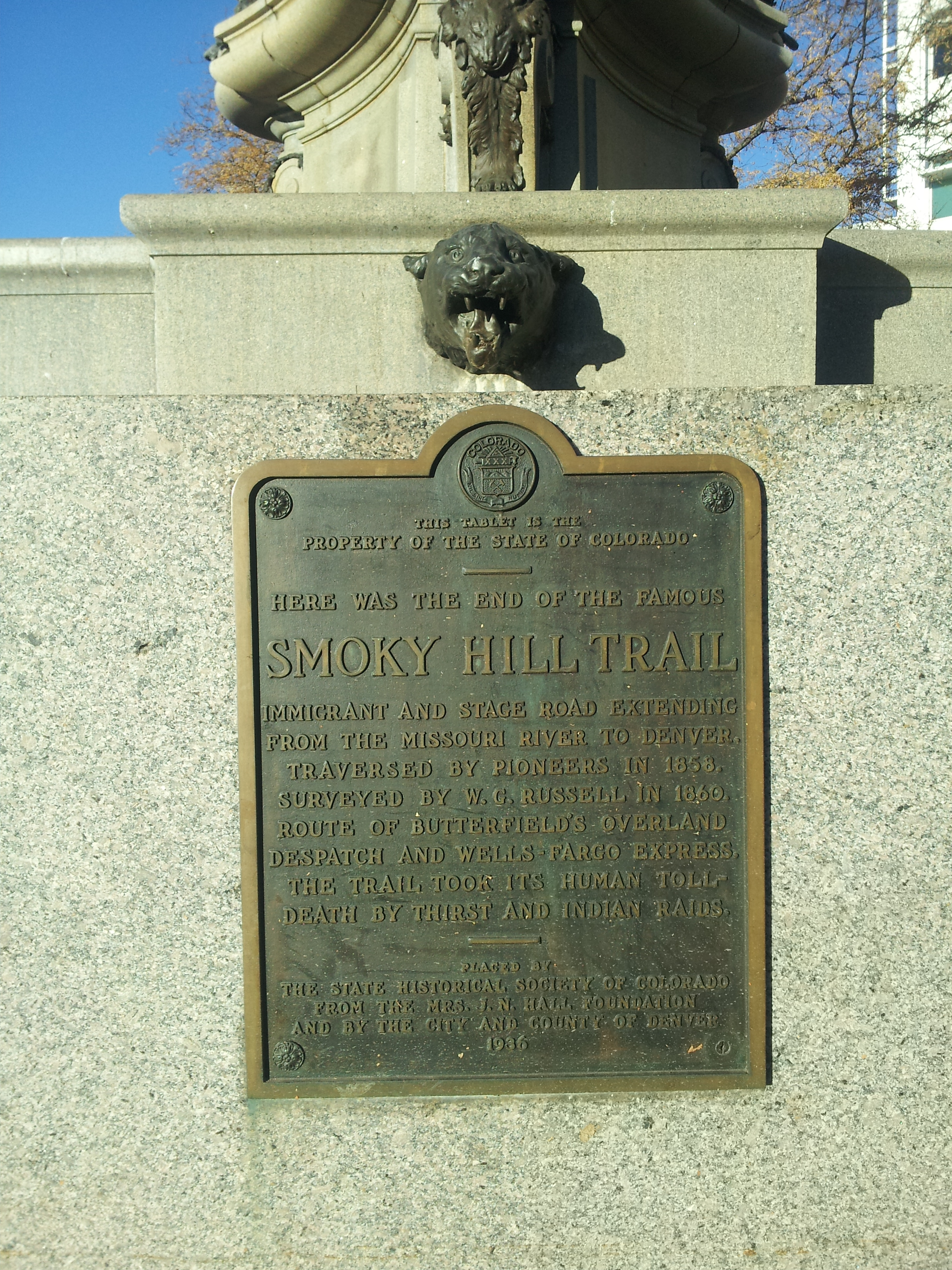
Smoky Hill Trail Marker on Pioneer Monument

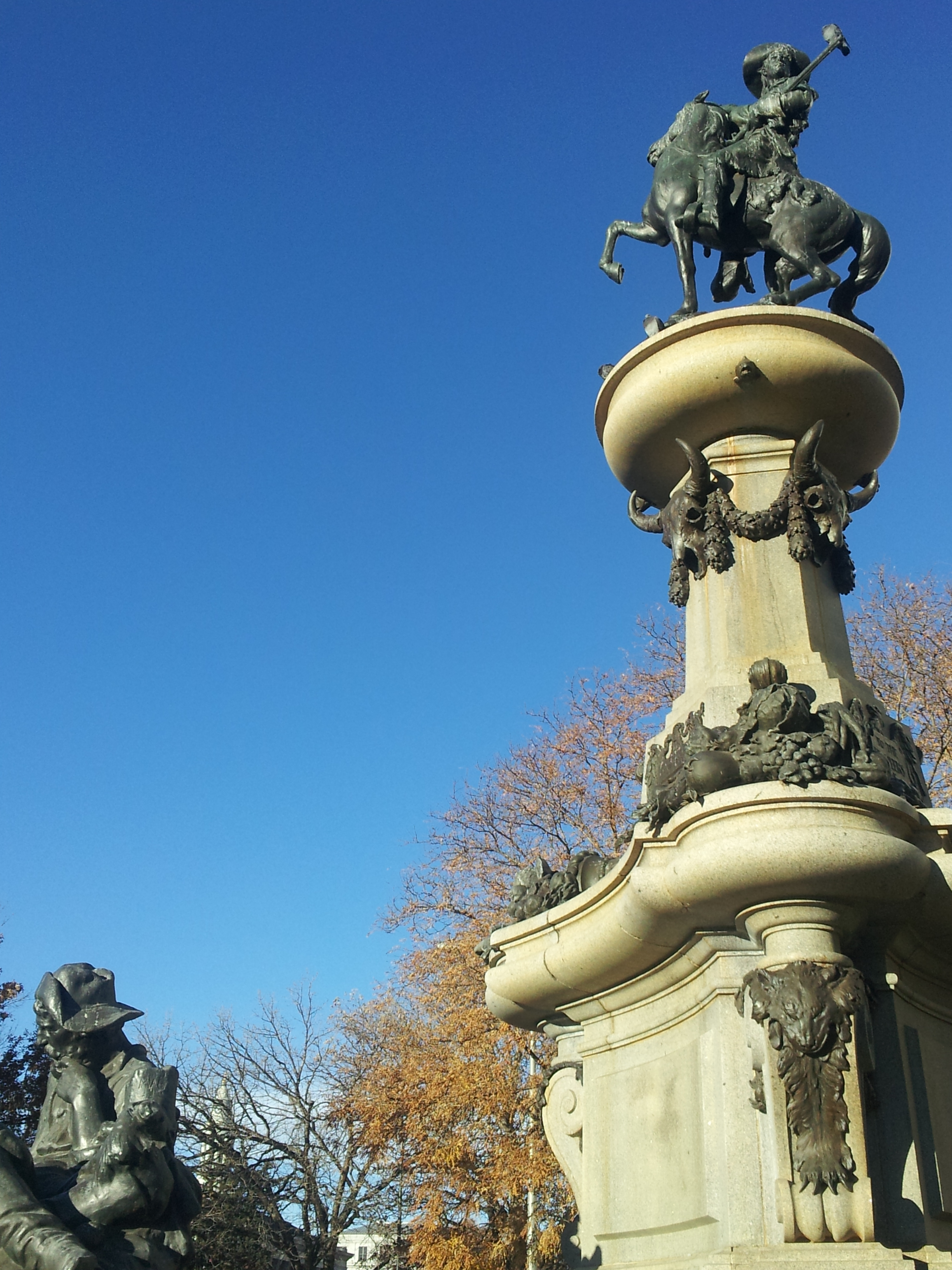
Pioneer Monument, Denver, Colorado

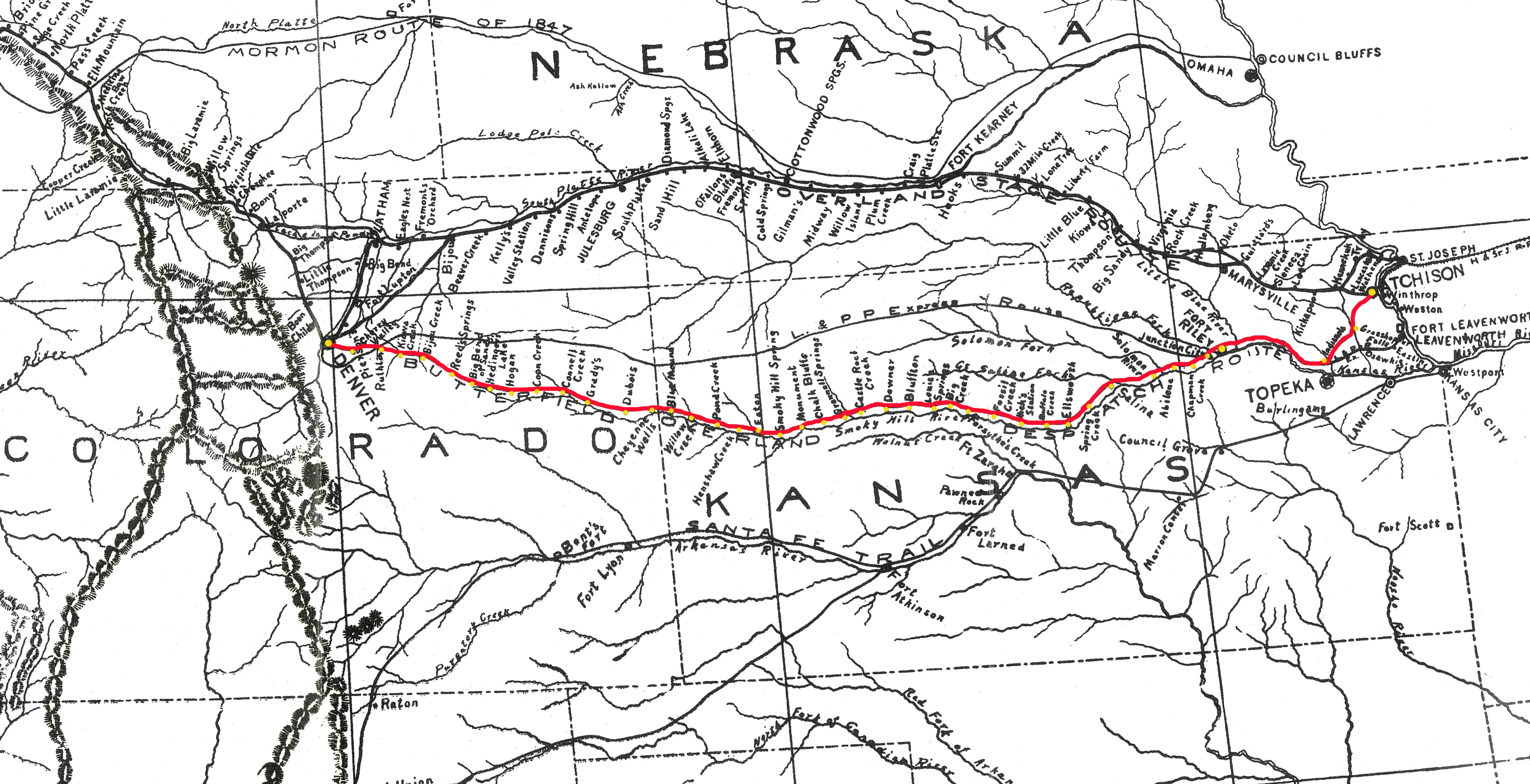
Route of the Butterfield Overland Despatch along the Smoky Hill Trail.
