= Pond Creek Station =

- U.S. National Register of Historic Places
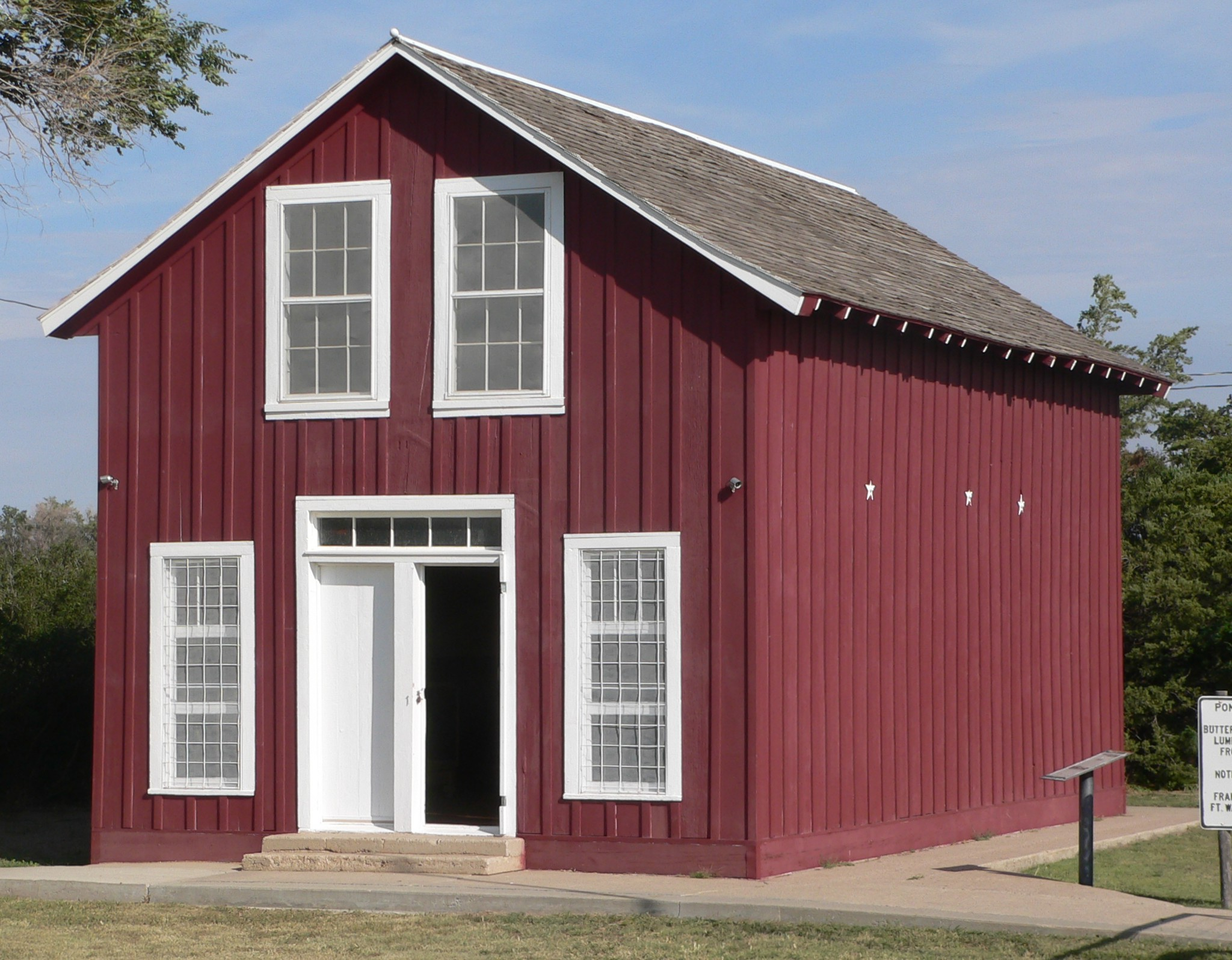

- Location within Kansas Location within the United States
- Location: E of Wallace on U.S. 40, Wallace, Kansas
- Coordinates: 38°54′37.25″N 101°34′59.7″W
- Built: 1865
- NRHP reference No.: 72000528
- Added to NRHP: February 23, 1972

The Pond Creek Station, located east of Wallace on US 40, in Wallace County, Kansas, is a two-story frame building that was a stagecoach station built in 1865. It is believed to be the oldest manmade structure in northwest Kansas and the only Butterfield Overland Dispatch stage company building surviving in Kansas. It was listed on the National Register of Historic Places in 1972.

The station building has been moved more than once, including in 1871 and 1898; it is now located just half a mile from its original location. It includes bullet holes from Indian attacks. At the time of its NRHP listing, it was used as a museum building by the Fort Wallace Memorial Association.
