= Medicine Arrows =

Cheyenne chief (c. 1795 – 1876)

Medicine Arrows (real name Ho'honaeve'ohtanehe, transl. Rock Forehead or Stone Forehead; c.1795 – 1876) was a Cheyenne chief and Keeper of the Medicine Arrows from 1850 until his death. Rock Forehead became known to whites as Medicine Arrows after his appointment to this office. Among the Cheyenne he was also known by the nickname "Walks with His Toes Turned Out."

Rock Forehead was a cousin of Black Kettle. His nephew, Little Man, would later become Arrow Keeper after his son, Black Hairy Dog. Several of his children took part in violent confrontations with whites. His youngest son, Fox Tail (Vohkėseeheva'xe), was accused of killing a Mexican herder at Fort Zarah in 1866 during a drunken brawl. His oldest son, Tall Wolf, was one of the principal men who took part in violent raids on white settlements along the Saline and Solomon rivers in Kansas in August 1867 and August 1868, one of the precipitating events leading ultimately to the Battle of the Saline River and the Battle of Washita River in 1867 and 1868 respectively. Rock Forehead's camp was one of several camps along the Washita River downstream of Black Kettle's village at the time the battle of the Washita which took place on November 27, 1868.

Rock Forehead's daughter was married to a man in Tall Bull's Dog Soldier band. She and her four children survived the Battle of Summit Springs on July 11, 1869, in which Tall Bull's village was destroyed by the 5th Cavalry Regiment; they were taken prisoner but were later released.

Fearing military reprisals following the Red River War, Rock Forehead fled his reservation in January 1875 to join the Northern Cheyenne in Montana. He died there peacefully in 1876. His son Black Hairy Dog succeeded him as Keeper of the Medicine Arrows. Descendants of Rock Forehead reside in the Western Oklahoma area.

== Notes ==
- Custer, George Armstrong. (1874). My Life on the Plains: Or Personal Experiences With the Indians. New York: Sheldon and Company.
- Greene, Jerome A. (2004). Washita, The Southern Cheyenne and the U.S. Army. Campaigns and Commanders Series, vol. 3. Norman, OK: University of Oklahoma Press. ISBN 0-8061-3551-4.
- Hardorff, Richard G., compiler & editor (2006). Washita Memories: Eyewitness Views of Custer's Attack on Black Kettle's Village. Norman, OK: University of Oklahoma Press. ISBN 0-8061-3759-2.
- Hoig, Stan. (1980). The Battle of the Washita: The Sheridan-Custer Indian Campaign of 1867-69. Lincoln, NE: University of Nebraska Press. ISBN 0-8032-7204-9. Previously published in 1976 (Garden City, NY: Doubleday). ISBN 0-385-11274-2.
