= Gwendolen Overton =

American writer (1874–1958)

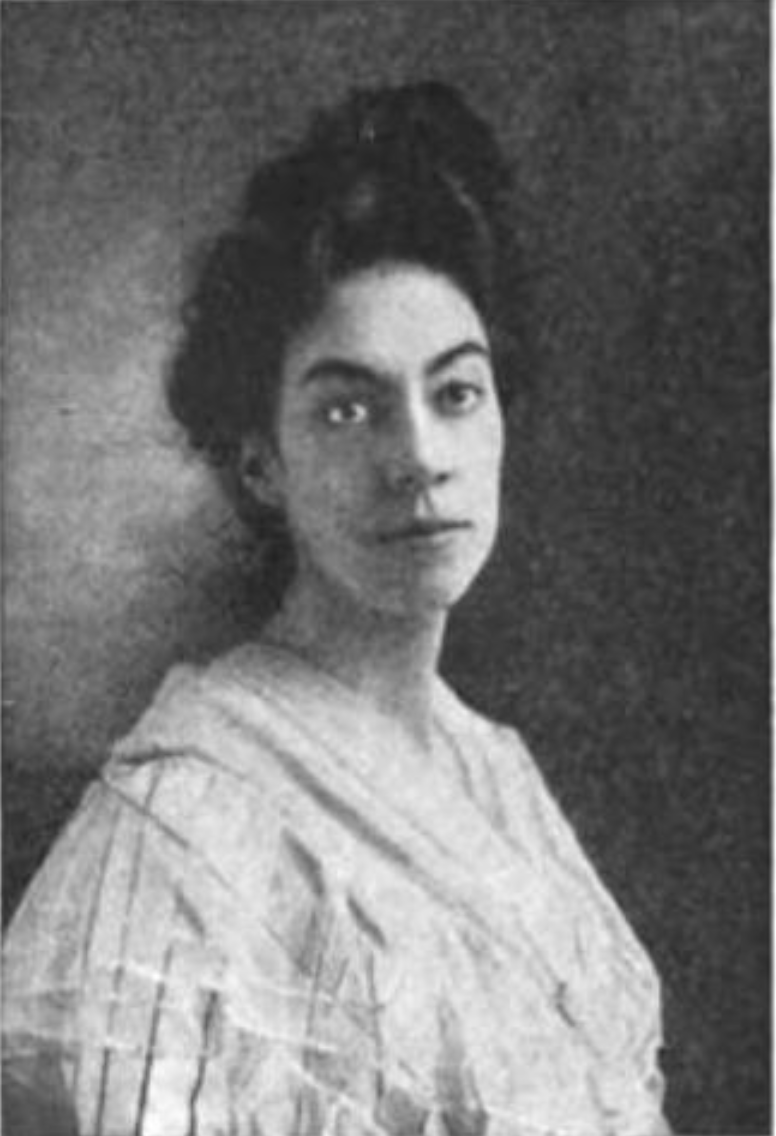
- Overton in 1901
- Born: February 19, 1874; Fort Hays, Kansas, U.S.
- Died: October 15, 1958 (aged 84); Los Angeles, California, U.S.
- Occupation: Writer
- Spouse: Melville Wilkinson (m. 1910)
- Writing career
- Language: English; French; Spanish
- Genres: novels; short stories
- Notable works: A Heritage of Unrest; The Captain's Daughter

Signature
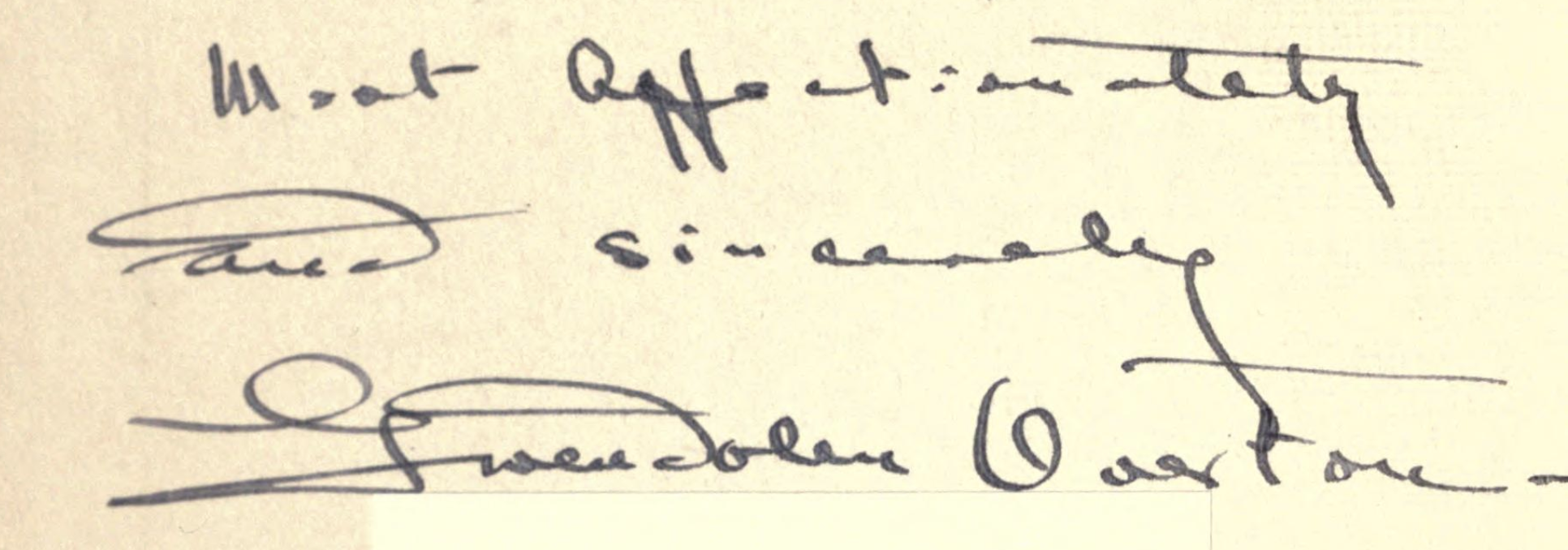

Gwendolen Overton (1874/76-1958; after marriage, Wilkinson) was an American fiction writer of novels and short stories. She spent her early life on the frontier with numerous changes of residence incident to her father's army life. This gave her a wide acquaintance with the country, and she absorbed the materials for much of her subsequent work. After living in various Eastern cities, and in Europe, she traveled in Canada, Mexico, and Central America before making her home in California. Overton began writing at an early age, and published several books, notably A Heritage of Unrest and The Captain's Daughter, as well as some short stories.

== Early life and education ==
Gwendolen Overton was born in Fort Hays, Kansas, on February 19, 1874, (Note: Baym (2012) records Gwendolen's year of birth as 1876.) Her parents were Jane Dyson (née Watkins) and Captain Gilbert Edmond Overton, an officer in the United States Army. She came from a long line of U.S.-born ancestors.

She began her continuous traveling when she was a month or two old. At that time she was taken with the troops, in an ambulance, on the long march from Kansas to Arizona. She lived in nearly all the army posts of Arizona and New Mexico. She took to ridding on the back of a burro at a young age, and then a mule, before she became a horsewoman. Overton was considered to be one of the finest horsewomen in the army. She was on the frontier most of the time, and in the Eastern U.S. part of the time, until she was fourteen, when the family moved to France for a few years.

Overton received her education in the public schools of the U.S. and Switzerland, and by private tutors in the U.S. and Paris. She learned to speak Spanish and French, as well as the French way of life and French literature.

== Career ==
Later the Overtons spent two years in Washington, D.C. When Overton was about 21 or 22, the family went to live in Los Angeles, California. Overton continued to live there when she was not on one of her long periodical trips to the East, or Mexico, Canada or elsewhere.

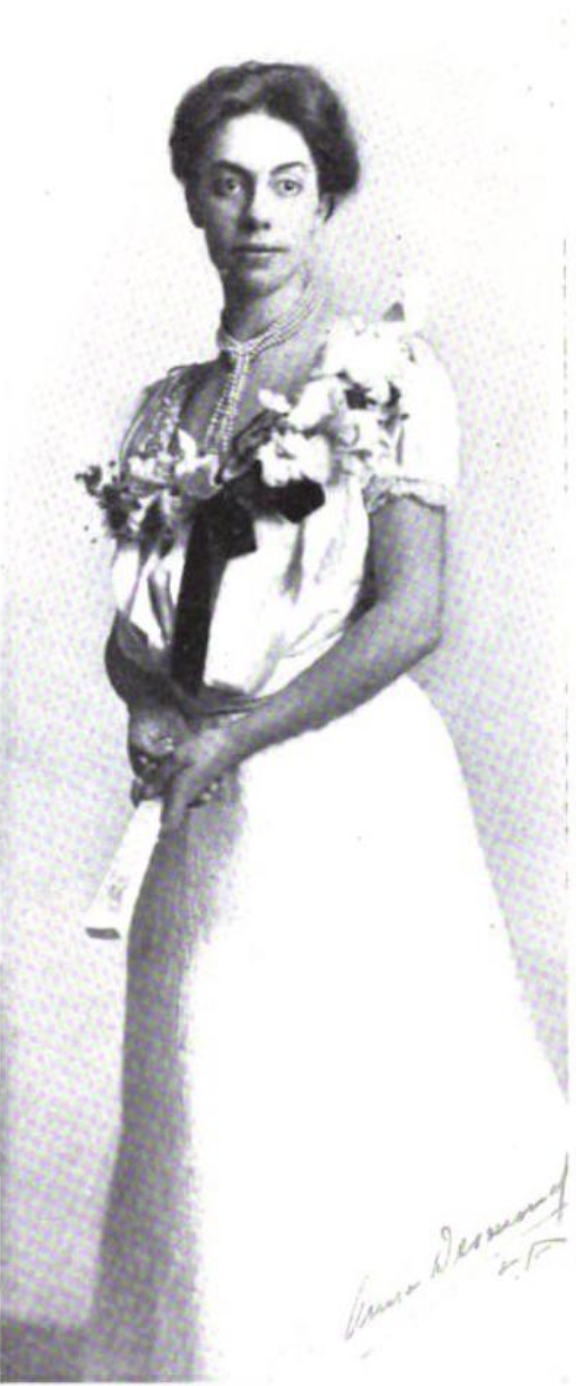
Overton in 1903

She was often spoken of as a California writer, but her outlook upon life, and to a large extent also her character, were formed by the plains and mountains in the Western U.S. The portions of Arizona and New Mexico in which army posts were situated left a deep impression.

For this reason, the distinction of Overton as a Californian writer was inexact. Besides, Overton did not write about California.

“If I can claim to be from or of any one place, I suppose I should say it was of the part of the country I wrote about in my first book. That life influenced me very greatly, and I dare say that no one who does not know it can understand the hold it takes on the affection and imagination of one who was brought up to it... Personally, I know I have a standard so severe as a consequence of Ste. Beuve and Brunetière that I am foredoomed to dissatisfaction with anything I may do."

In her choice of reading, Overton differed characteristically from other novelists of her day. She read few modern novels, and did not care for the lives of other authors, poets and people of that description. People of action attracted her. It was their lives that she fancied. Having been brought up and trained on the better French novelists and the French critics made Overton hypercritical of modern novelists in the English language. She seemed to have no penchant for literary colonies, clubs, or papers. Overton was at her desk by 8:30 every morning and worked until lunch time.

Overton was the author of several novels such as The captain's daughter, which ran serially in The Youth's Companion; A Heritage of Unrest, a psychological study set in Arizona; and Anne Carmel, set in Nova Scotia. Captains of the World is presented from the point of view of the labor union.

Her first story was printed in the Evening Star of Washington, D.C, about 1890. Since then, she was a frequent contributor of short stories to Ainslee's Magazine, Appleton's Magazine, Harper's Monthly Magazine, Our Paper, St. Nicholas, The Argonaut , The Atlantic The Forum, The Land of Sunshine, The Railway Clerk, and other Eastern magazines.

Overton favored woman suffrage; she wrote magazine and newspaper articles on the topic.

== Personal life ==
On February 10, 1910, in Los Angeles, Overton married Melville C. Wilkinson. Their home, "Cien Sierras Ranch", was located in Blythe, California.

In religion, she was Episcopalian, but particularly interested in the broader Theosophical doctrines. In politics, she was Independent. She believed strongly in Single tax, but was otherwise conservative.

She spent her afternoons in recreation. In particular, she liked sailing, and much of her leisure was spent on the water in company with her younger brother.

Later in life, Overton became a quiet resident in Los Angeles. Overton died in that city on October 15, 1958.<ref"Overton". Los Angeles Times. October 18, 1958. p. 13.</ref>

== Selected works ==
=== Books ===
- Anne Carmel (New York : Macmillan, 1903)
- The captain's daughter (New York, London : The Macmillan Company, 1903)
- Captains of the world (New York : The Macmillan; London, Macmillan, 1904)
- The golden chain (New York, London : The Macmillan company, 1903)
- The heritage of unrest (New York : The Macmillan company; London, Macmillan & Co., Ltd., 1901)
- Woman Suffrage (The North American Review, 1911) (text)

=== Articles ===
- "At Twilight", Harper's Magazine, 1915
- "A Wall Tent Bewitchment", Ainslee's Magazine, 1901
- "David", The Atlantic Monthly, 1911
- "Esther's Christmas", St. Nicholas, 1910
- "Goss", Our Paper, 1908
- "Manuela's Transformation. A Western Romance.", The Railway Clerk, 1906
- "Marie Bashkirtseff", Forum, 1912
- "Miss Etherington", Harper's Monthly Magazine, 1907
- "The Price", Harper's New Monthly Magazine, 1912
- "Revolt Against Petticoat Rule", Appleton's Magazine, 1903
- "The Speech of Deeds", Harper's Monthly Magazine, 1907

== Gallery ==
Anne Carmel

The captain's daughter

Captains of the world

The golden chain

The heritage of unrest
