= Fort Hays =

United States Army fort near Hays, Kansas

- 1472 U.S. Highway 183 Alt, Hays, Kansas in United States
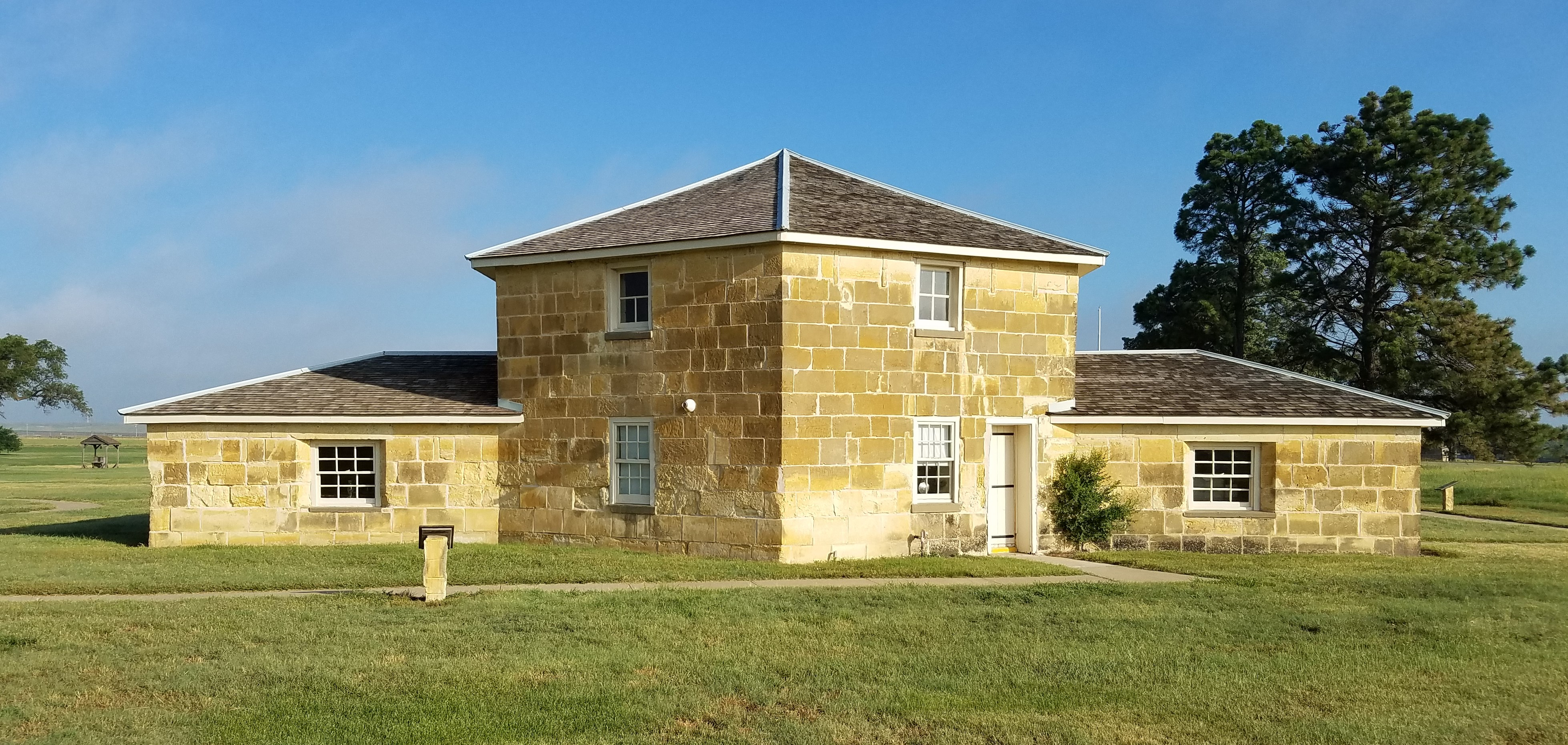
- The stone blockhouse at Fort Hays

Site information
- Type: Military base
- Owner: Kansas Historical Society
- Open to the public: Yes
- Condition: Partially dismantled; remnants preserved as a historical site

Location
- Location in Kansas
- Coordinates: 38°51′42″N 99°20′32″W

Site history
- Built: 1865 (1st site); 1866 (2nd site); 1867 (final site)
- Built by: U.S. Army
- In use: 1865-1889

Garrison information
- Past commanders: Nelson Miles; Philip Sheridan
- Garrison: 5th Infantry Regiment; 7th Cavalry Regiment; 10th Cavalry Regiment; 38th Infantry Regiment
- Fort Hays State Historic Site
- U.S. National Register of Historic Places
- Location: Frontier Historical Park, Hays, Kansas
- Area: 177 acres (72 ha)
- Built: 1867
- NRHP reference No.: 71000314
- Added to NRHP: January 25, 1971

Fort Hays, originally named Fort Fletcher, was a United States Army fort near Hays, Kansas. Active from 1865 to 1889 it was an important frontier post during the American Indian Wars of the late 19th century. Reopened as a historical park in 1929, it is operated by the Kansas Historical Society as the Fort Hays State Historic Site.

== History ==
To protect Butterfield Overland Despatch stage and freight wagons traveling the Smoky Hill Trail from Cheyenne and Arapaho attacks, the U.S. Army established Fort Fletcher on October 11, 1865. Named after then governor of Missouri Thomas C. Fletcher, the fort was located on the trail 1/4 mile (0.4 km) south of the confluence of Big Creek and the North Fork of Big Creek in western Kansas. Lt. Col. William Tamblyn and three companies of the 1st U.S. Volunteer Infantry established the post and were stationed there along with detachments of the 13th Missouri Cavalry. Raids on the stage line continued despite the military presence, and the line soon went bankrupt. Use of the trail ceased, and Fort Fletcher closed on May 5, 1866.

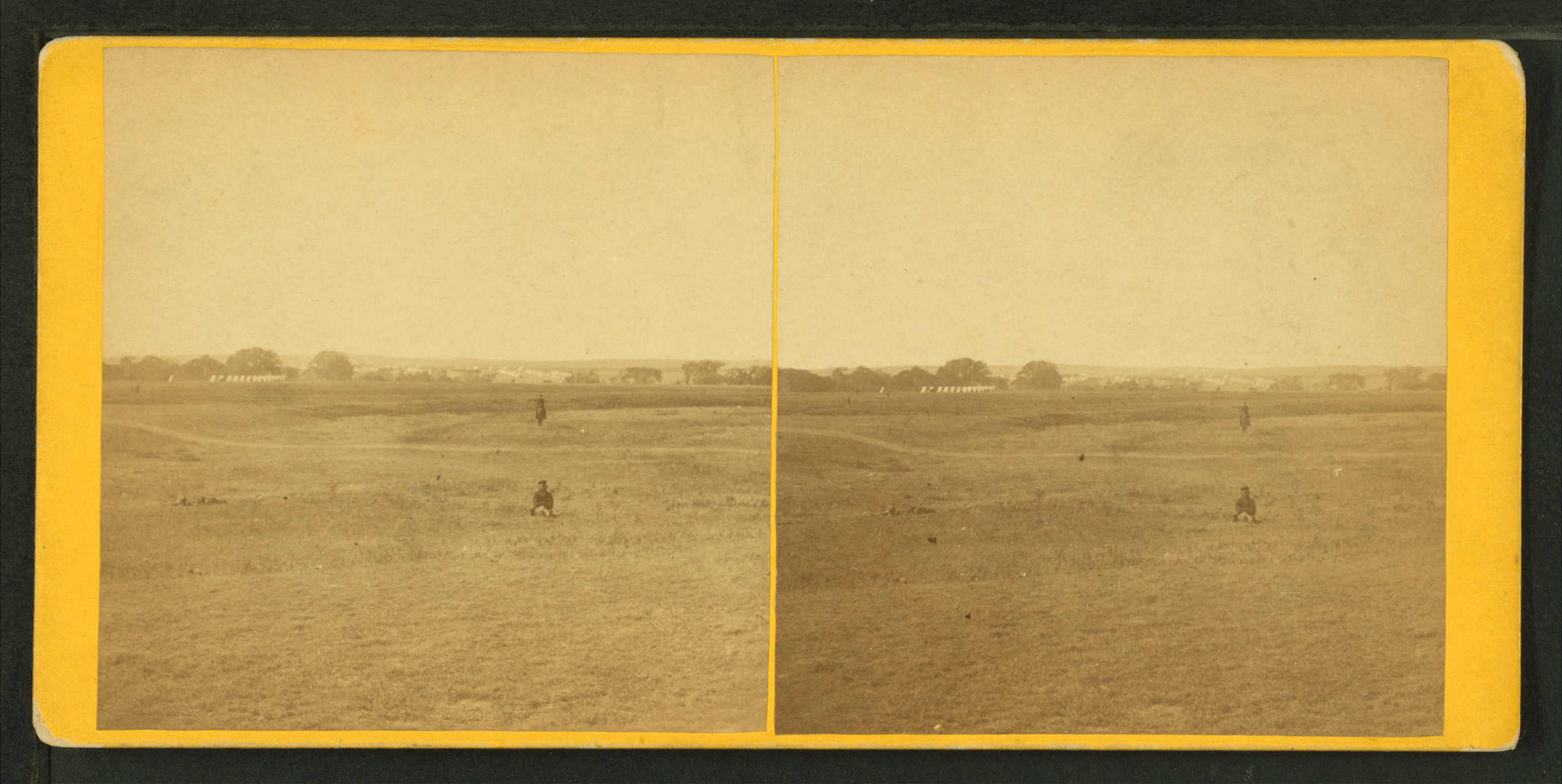
View of the new Fort Hays (the bivouac beyond the distant trees of Big Creek) from the weeks-old Hays City train station (1867)

The U.S. Army reopened Fort Fletcher on October 11, 1866, at the confluence of Big Creek and its north fork, 1/4 mile north of the previous site. This time, the purpose of the fort was to protect workers building the Union Pacific Eastern Division railway westward, parallel to the Smoky Hill Trail. A month later, in November, the Army renamed the post Fort Hays after Brig. Gen. Alexander Hays who was killed at the Battle of the Wilderness during the American Civil War. On June 7, 1867, a severe flood nearly destroyed the fort, killing nine soldiers and civilians.

The Army planned to use Fort Hays as a supply depot for other posts in the region and thus needed it to be located close to the railway. But, the path of the railroad was five miles (8 km) to the north. Between that and the flood, the Army decided to relocate the fort. On orders from Maj. Gen. Winfield Hancock, Maj. Alfred Gibbs chose a new location 15 miles (24.1 km) to the northwest where the railway would cross Big Creek. The Army occupied this site, moving Fort Hays to its final location, on June 23, 1867. Attracted by the fort's new location and the railroad's westward extension, settlers soon arrived and established the communities of Rome and Hays City nearby, the latter named after the fort.

The Fort Hays reservation occupied a triangular area of approximately 7,500 acres (3,000 ha). Like other forts on the Great Plains, it was not a true fortification but appeared to be more like a frontier settlement. There was no wall around the post, and the only defensive structure was a blockhouse. The post was designed as a base for supplies and troops who could be dispatched into the field to protect vulnerable people and places when conflict with Plains Indians broke out. Development of the fort continued over time, and, at one point, it included around 45 buildings.

A cholera epidemic struck the area late in the summer of 1867. Among the victims was Elizabeth Polly, a woman who had been ministering to the ill at the fort. Buried at the base of a nearby hill, she went on to become a figure in local folklore, the "Blue Light Lady," as people claimed to see her ghost in the area around the fort.

Fort Hays became a key Army installation in the Indian Wars, serving as a base of operations for combat forces and a supply point for Fort Dodge and Camp Supply to the south. Maj. Gen. Philip Sheridan, supported by Lt. Col. George Custer and the 7th Cavalry Regiment, used it as his headquarters during his 1868-1869 campaign against the Cheyenne and the Kiowa. Both Buffalo Bill Cody and Wild Bill Hickok served as Army scouts at Fort Hays at points during this period. Custer and the 7th Cavalry continued to operate from the fort when Col. Nelson Miles assumed command in April 1869. Miles led the 5th Infantry Regiment, assigned to protect the railroad as its construction extended west into Colorado Territory. In 1871, Custer and the 7th Cavalry were reassigned to the South, and Miles and the 5th Infantry headquarters relocated to Fort Leavenworth. Throughout this period, elements of the 10th Cavalry Regiment, known as "Buffalo Soldiers", and the 38th Infantry Regiment were also stationed at the fort. On May 3, 1869, a gunfight broke out between soldiers of the 38th Infantry Regiment and civilians In Hays; 1 soldier of the 7th cavalry was dangerously wounded in the head and five civilians were wounded.

The U.S. Army continued to use Fort Hays until June 1, 1889, finally closing and abandoning it November 8, 1889. The Kansas Legislature requested that the site be donated for use as a soldiers' home, but the U.S. Department of the Interior (DOI) subsequently assumed custody of the fort's land and buildings. In 1895, the Legislature again requested donation of the site to no avail, this time for educational and recreational purposes. Four years later, the DOI declared the fort's land open for settlement. On March 28, 1900, due to efforts by the Kansas congressional delegation, the U.S. Congress passed an act donating the Fort Hays reservation to the state of Kansas for use as an experiment station of the Kansas State Agricultural College and a branch of the Kansas State Normal School. In 1901, the Legislature established the experiment station and set aside land for the normal school. The school opened in June 1902 and eventually became Fort Hays State University. Kansas State University continues to operate the experiment station as an agricultural research center.

The majority of the fort's buildings were auctioned off or sold for scrap in 1902. What remained of the reservation reopened as Frontier Historical Park in 1929. A museum opened on the grounds in 1955. Named a state historic site in 1967, it was acquired by the Kansas Historical Society which continues to operate the property as the Fort Hays State Historic Site.

== Fort Hays State Historic Site ==
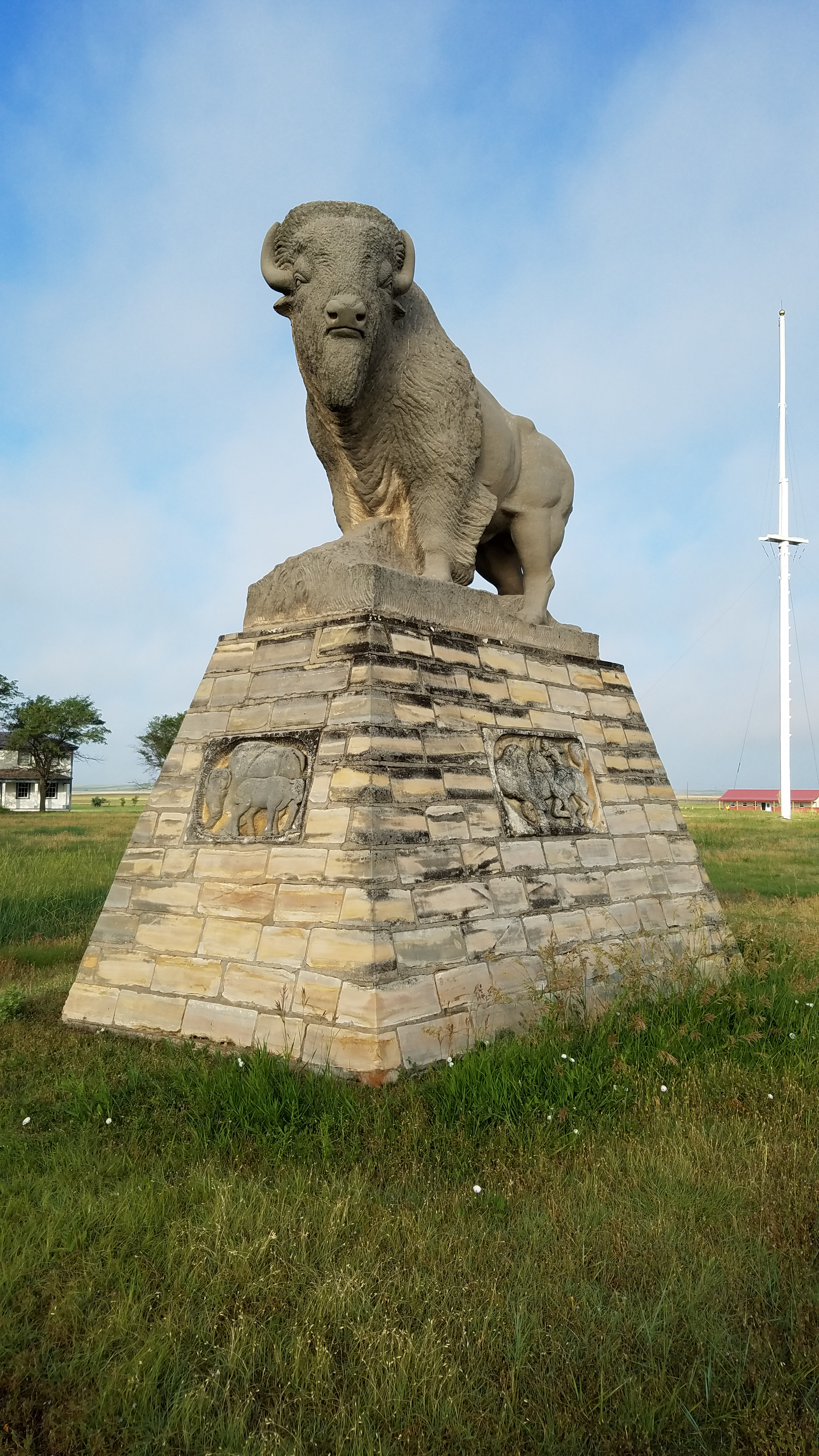
Monarch of the Plains, 1967 Pete Felten Jr.

The Kansas Historical Society maintains what remains of the Fort Hays reservation as the Fort Hays State Historic Site. The site includes a visitor center, the fort's parade ground, and four of its original buildings: the blockhouse, the guardhouse, and two of the officers' quarters. The blockhouse, built in 1867, and the guardhouse, built in 1872, house exhibits on the fort's history, its construction, and on life at the fort as experienced by the soldiers stationed there. The two restored officers' quarters feature furnishings from the 1860s through the 1880s, spanning the fort's active period. The visitor center, built in 1967, contains exhibits on the conflict between the U.S. and the Plains Indians as well as Plains Indian artifacts from the period. Other exhibits on the grounds represent civilians who lived and worked at the fort and the locations of the post's other original buildings. Commemorating the 1867-1967 centennial, the sculpture Monarch of the Plains was installed overlooking the highway passing the Historic Site.

== Location ==
The Fort Hays State Historic Site is located at 38°51′42″N 99°20′32″W (38.8616784, -99.3423263) at an elevation of 2,024 feet (617 m). It consists of 177 acres (72 ha) on the south side of the U.S. Route 183 Bypass immediately southwest of Hays, Kansas. The main campus of Fort Hays State University lies north of the site across the bypass and Big Creek.

The original site of Fort Fletcher, used from October 1865 to May 1866, was located on Big Creek one-quarter mile south of the creek's confluence with the North Fork of Big Creek. The second site of Fort Fletcher, used from October 1866 to June 1867 and renamed Fort Hays in November 1866, was located at the confluence. The confluence is located at 38°47′52″N 99°05′04″W about 5 miles (8.0 km) south of Walker, Kansas and 14 miles (23 km) southeast of Hays. The final site of Fort Hays, to which the post moved in June 1867, is where the historic site stands today.

== In popular culture and the arts ==
Fort Hays was a setting of the films The Plainsman (1936) and Dances with Wolves (1990), the television film Stolen Women, Captured Hearts (1997), and the 1967 television series Custer. The film set used for the Fort Hays scenes in Dances with Wolves is located near Rapid City, South Dakota and is now operated as a tourist attraction, the Fort Hays Old West Town & Dinner Show.

== Notable people ==
Notable individuals who lived at, worked at, or were associated with Fort Hays include:

- George A. Armes (1844–1919), U.S. Army Major
- Louis H. Carpenter (1839–1916), U.S. Army Brigadier General
- Buffalo Bill Cody (1846–1917), scout, buffalo hunter, showman
- George Custer (1839–1876), U.S. Army Bvt. Major General
- George Forsyth (1837–1915), U.S. Army Bvt. Brigadier General
- Wild Bill Hickok (1837–1876), scout, lawman
- Nelson A. Miles (1839–1925), U.S. Army Lieutenant General
- Gwendolen Overton (1874/76-1958), writer; born at Fort Hays
- Elizabeth Polly (?-1867), hospital matron
- Marcus Reno (1834–1889), U.S. Army Bvt. Brigadier General
- Philip Sheridan (1831–1888), U.S. Army General of the Army
- George M. Sternberg (1838–1915), U.S. Army Surgeon General, early Kansas paleontologist
- Samuel Mellison (1849–1927) Ft. Hays Post Trader and Sutler for 9 years until closing at which time he was presented with the flag from Ft. Hays, November 8, 1889.

Notable individuals who visited the early operational Fort Hays include:

- Alexander Gardner (1821–1882), photographer, October 1867
- Alexei Alexandrovich Romanov (1834–1889), Grand Duke of Russia
- Henry M. Stanley (1841–1904), Welsh-American journalist and explorer
- Samuel J. Crawford (1835–1913), third Governor of Kansas, September 14–15, 1867

== Gallery ==
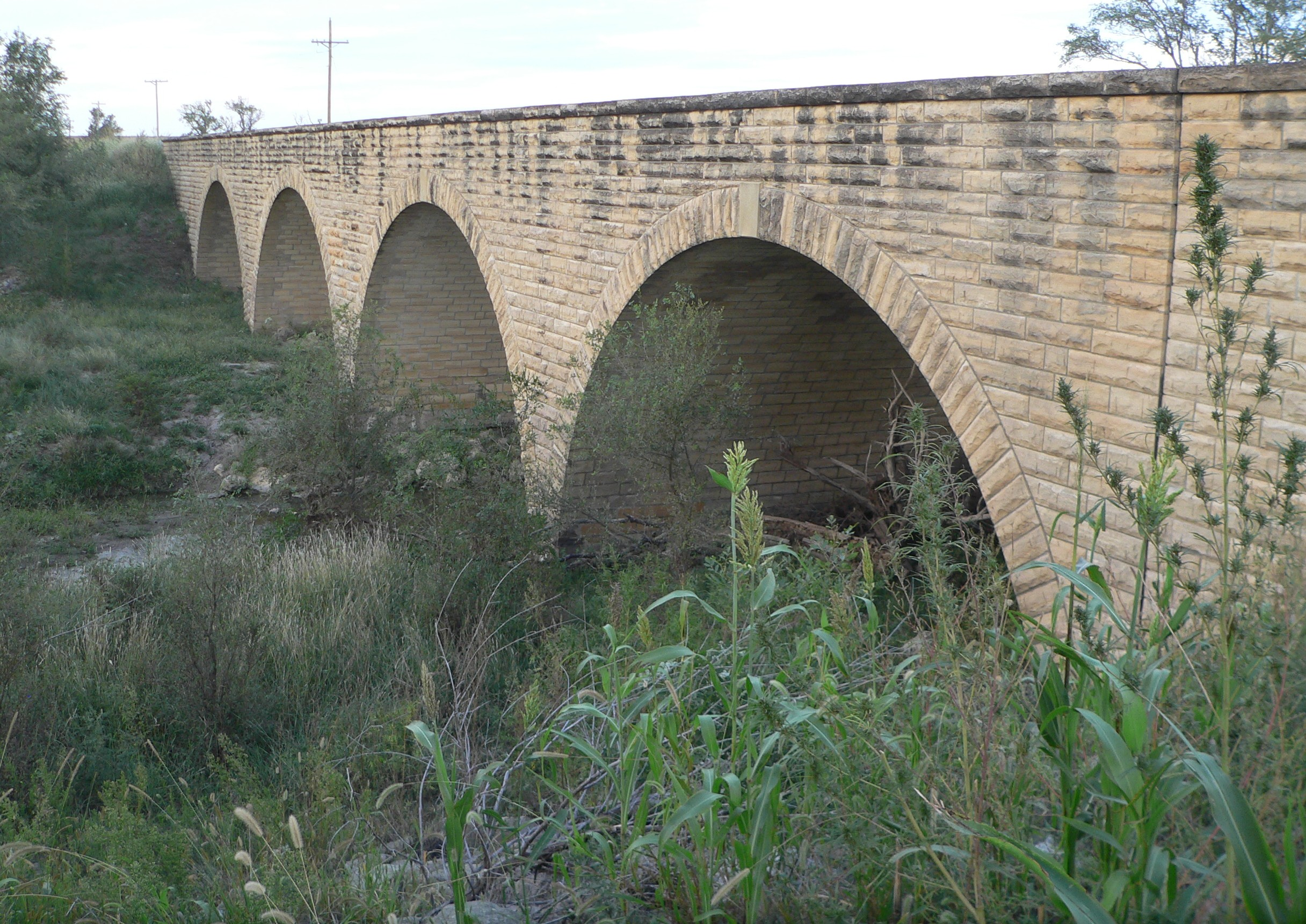
Fort Fletcher Bridge

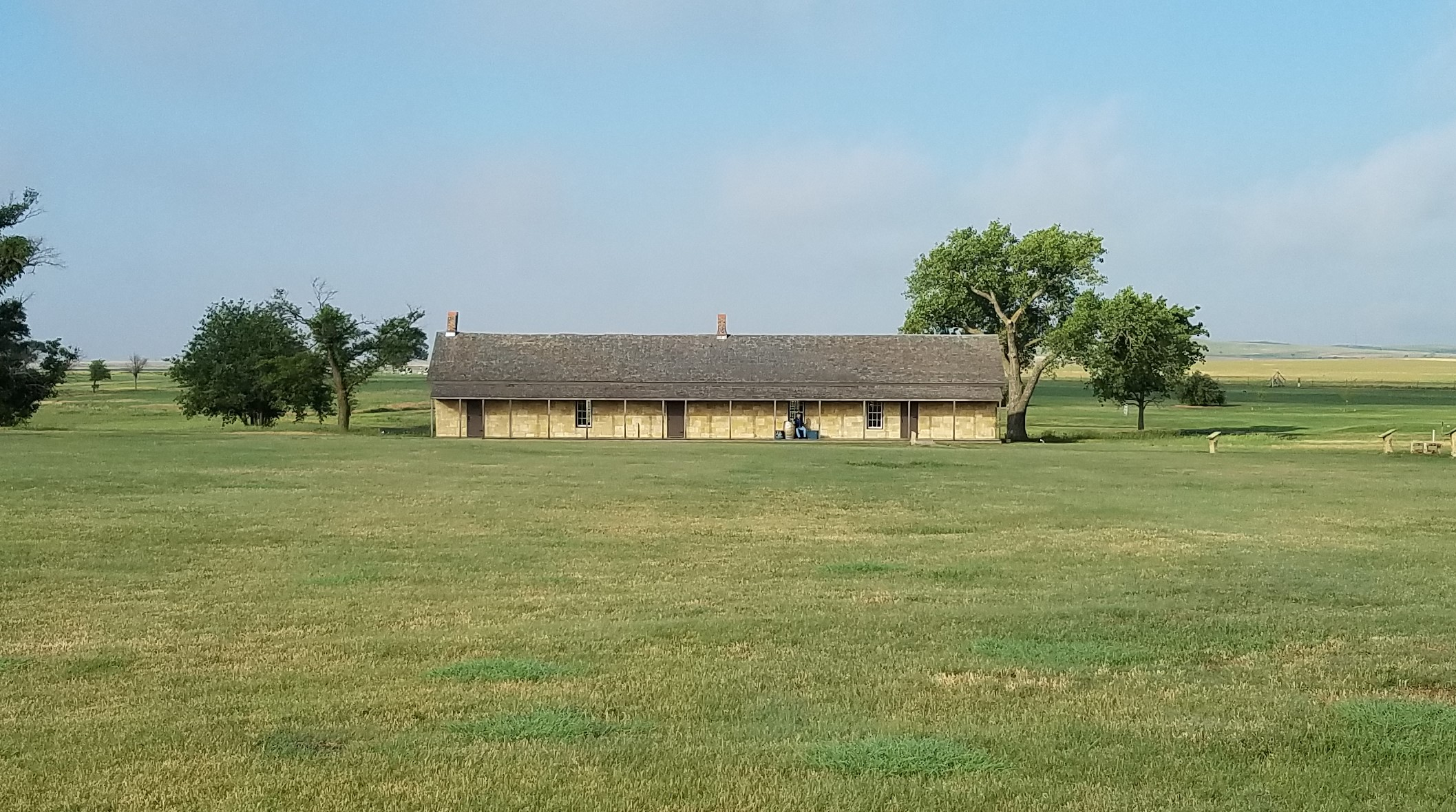
Fort Hays guardhouse, built in 1867

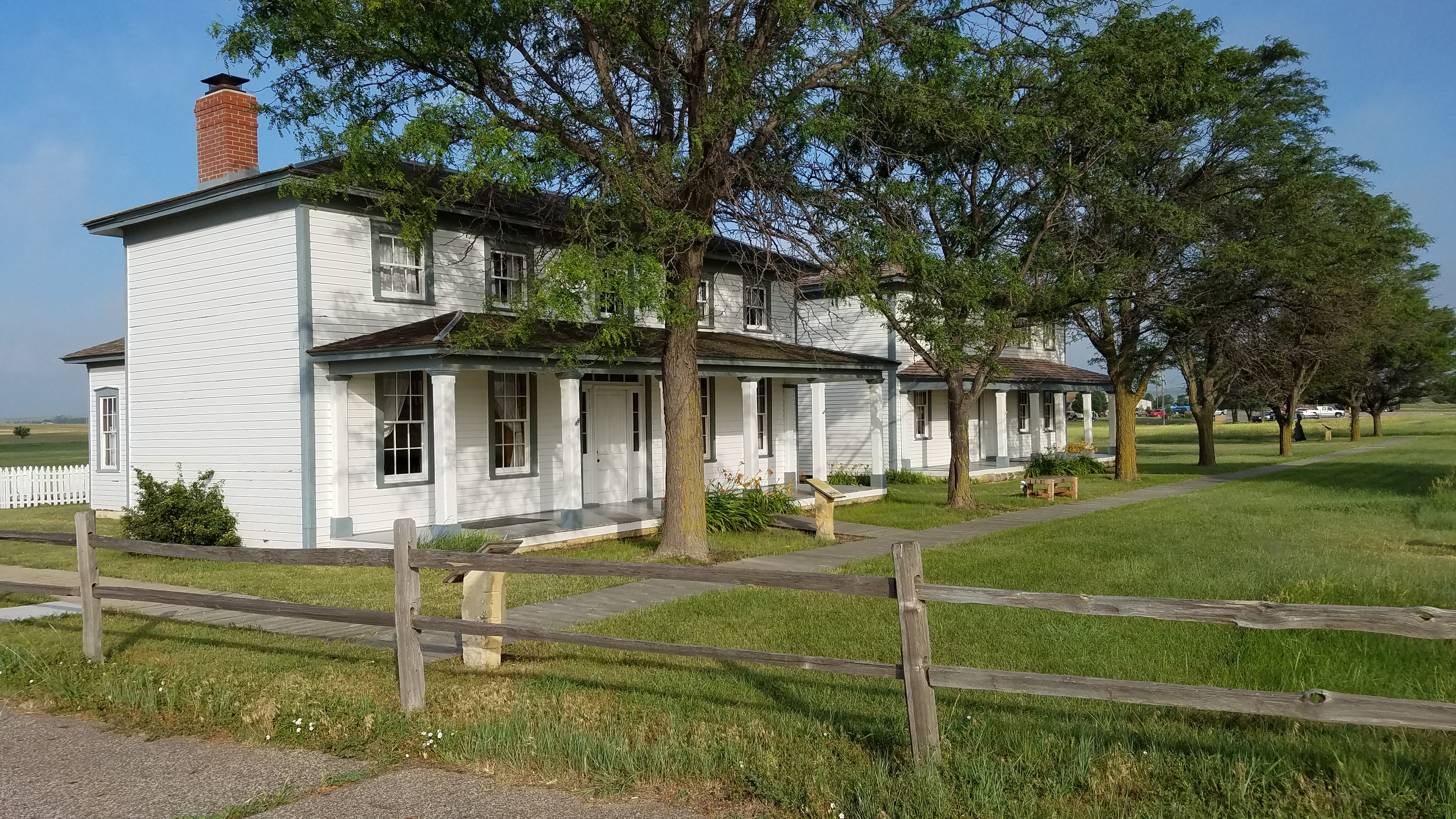
Fort Hays officers' quarters, built 1867–1870

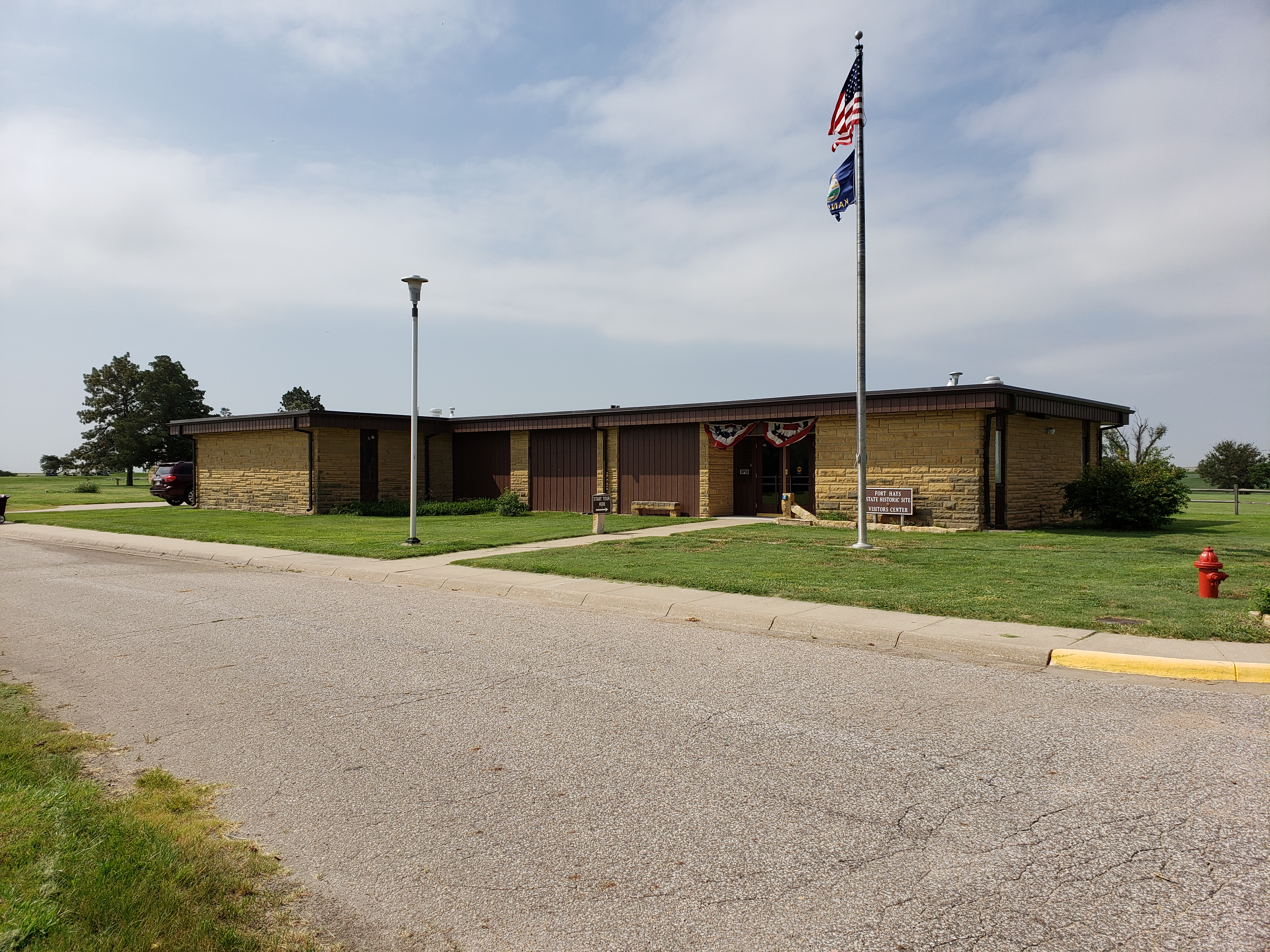
Fort Hays Visitor Center
