= Kansas Pacific Railway =

Defunct American railroad

Overview
- Headquarters: Wyandotte, Kansas (part of present-day Kansas City, Kansas)
- Locale: Kansas and Colorado
- Dates of operation: 1863–1880
- Successor: Union Pacific

Technical
- Track gauge: 4 ft 8 1/2 in (1,435 mm) standard gauge

The Kansas Pacific Railway (KP) was a historic railroad company that operated in the western United States in the late 19th century. It was a federally chartered railroad, backed with government land grants. The railroad was originally titled the "Union Pacific, Eastern Division", although it was completely independent of the Union Pacific Railroad. At a time when the first transcontinental railroad was being constructed by the Central Pacific and Union Pacific Railroads, it tried and failed to join the transcontinental ranks. The owners lobbied heavily in Washington, D.C. for public funding, but failed to fund continued construction west of Colorado.

Instead, the Pennsylvania Railroad, working with Missouri financiers, designed the KP as a feeder line to the transcontinental system. It operated many of the first long-distance lines in the state of Kansas in the 1870s, extending the national railway network westward across that state and into Colorado. Its main line furnished a principal transportation route that opened up settlement of the central Great Plains, and its link from Kansas City to Denver provided the last link in the coast-to-coast railway network in 1870.

The railroad was consolidated with the Union Pacific in 1880, and its mainline continues to be an integral part of the Union Pacific network today.

== History ==
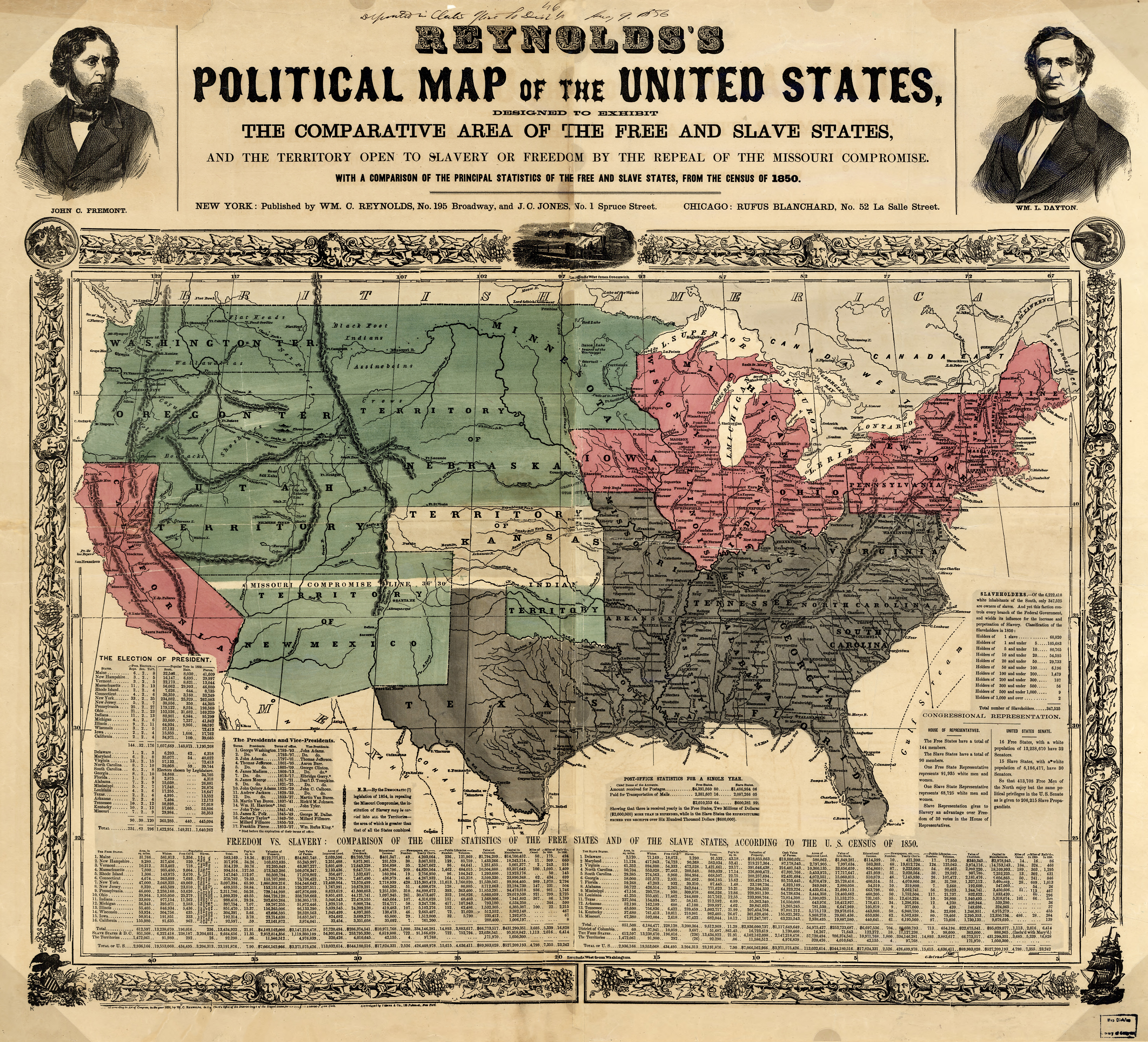
An 1856 map of the political context of the LP&W/UPED.

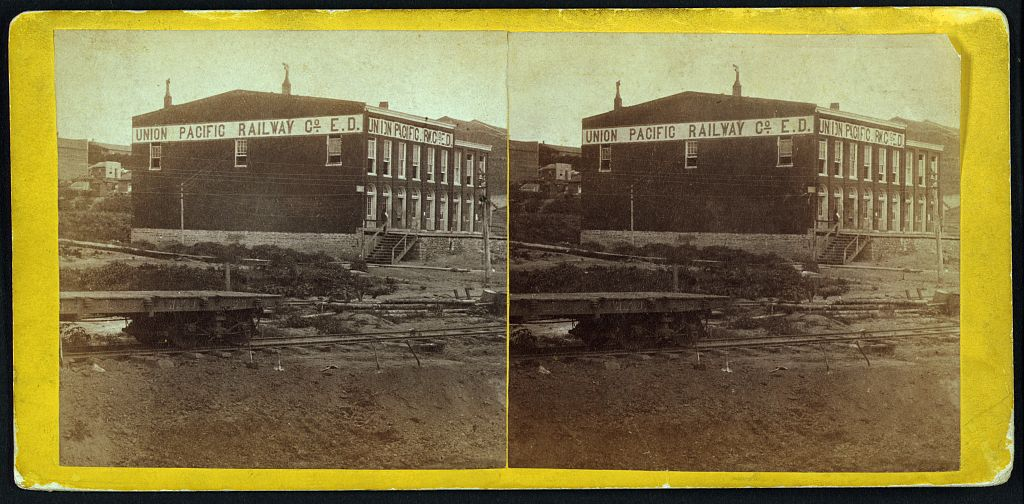
The railroad's headquarters in Wyandotte City, previously the Wyandotte Constitutional Hall of 1859.
Alexander Gardner, 1867.

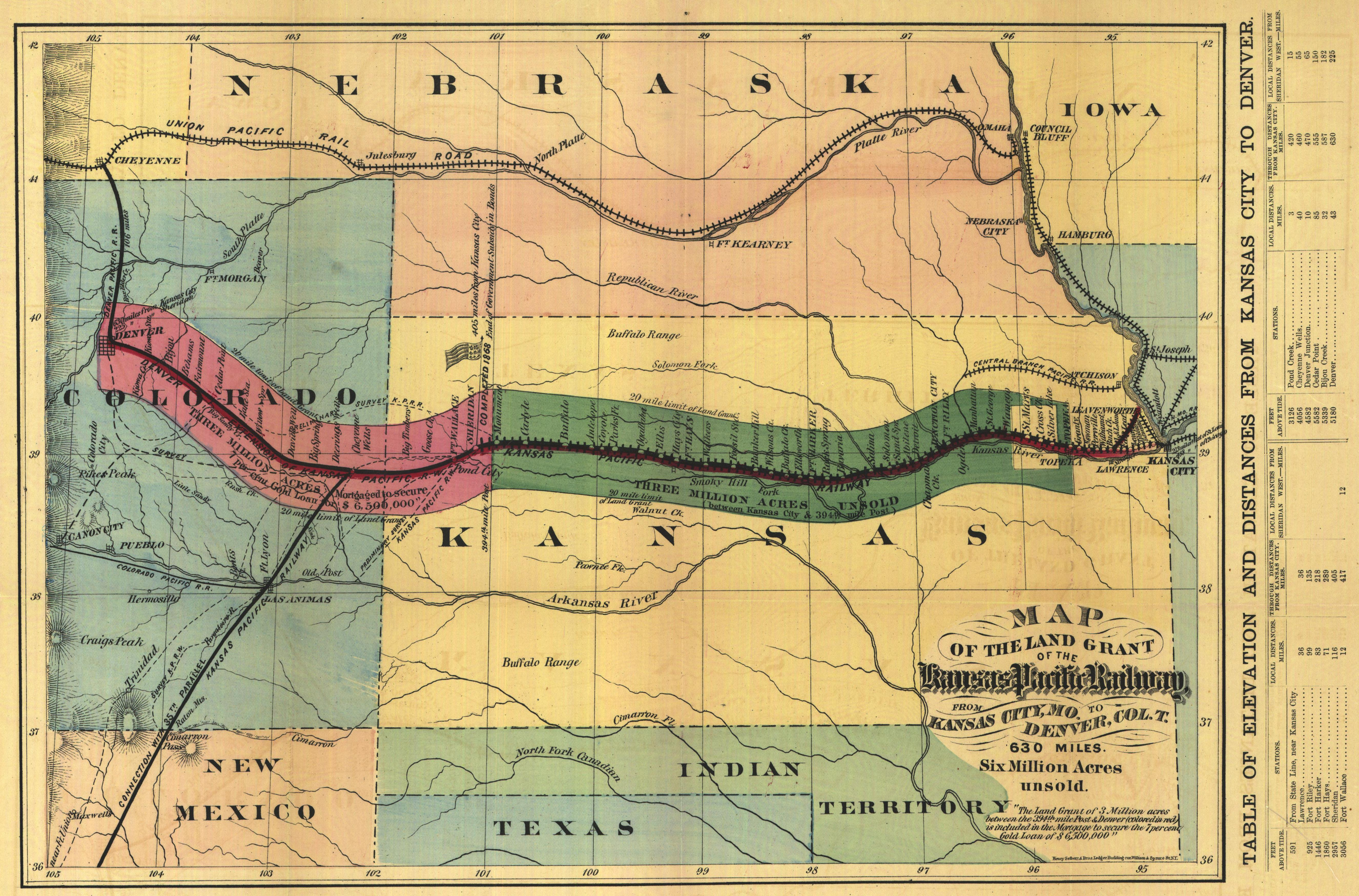
An 1869 map of the Kansas Pacific land grants available to settlers (green and red bands). The green band marks the track completed by that year, and the red marks the completion to Denver by 1870.

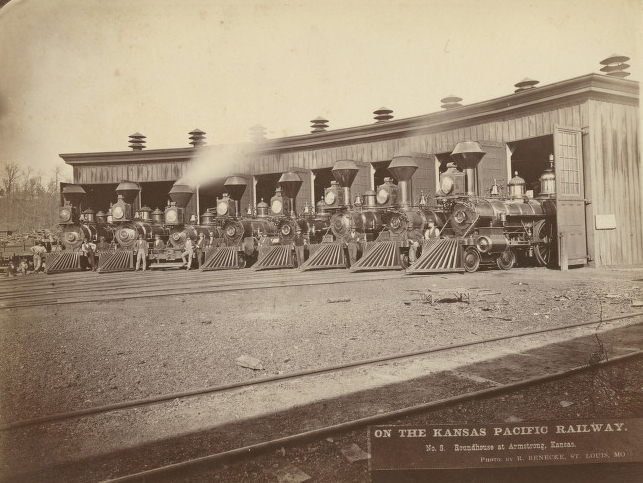
Roundhouse at Armstrong, Kansas, named for Silas Armstrong, a Wyandotte high chief (now within Kansas City, Kansas). Robert Benecke, 1873.

The progenitor of the Kansas Pacific was organized in 1855 as the Leavenworth, Pawnee and Western Railroad (LP&W). Fort Leavenworth was the first permanent U.S. settlement in Kansas. Also organized in 1855 on the east boundary of Fort Riley, Pawnee was very briefly the original territorial capital of Kansas before being demolished by order of Secretary of War Jefferson Davis the same year.

The construction of the line was motivated in part by the desire of the U.S. government to extend transportation routes into the Kansas Territory (1854–1861), which due to the Kansas–Nebraska Act the previous year became the center of violence between Abolitionist and Pro-Slavery states, in what was called Bleeding Kansas (1854–1859) and the prelude to Kansas Statehood (1861) and the subsequent American Civil War (1861–1866). Moreover, major river ports had been established on either side of Kaw Point; one was the Pro-Slavery Westport, MO, and the other was Wyandotte City founded in 1844 by the Sandusky Wyandot who had purchased 36 square miles of land from the Delaware Indians above the mouth of the Kansas River. These riverports served a number of transcontinental wagon trails, notably, the Santa Fe Trail, the Oregon Trail, and the Smoky Hill Trail. However, as was the case with a number of other proposed territory railroads organized at the time, no construction occurred before the Civil War.

In 1863, John C. Frémont and Samuel Hallett acquired control of LP&W stock and reorganized it as the Union Pacific Eastern Division (UPED). The UPED was authorized by the United States Congress as part of the Pacific Railway Act, in order to create a second southerly branch of the transcontinental railroad, alongside the Union Pacific. With Leavenworth businesses failing to support the railroad, Hallett located the railhead of the UPED at the Wyandotte City riverport. In 1864, freight and passenger service was established between Wyandotte City and Lawrence.

In March 1869, an Act of the United States Congress changed the name to Kansas Pacific Railway. As in the case with the Union Pacific, the Pacific Railway Act authorized large land grants to the railroad along its mainline. Such grants were to be distributed to homesteaders who would populate the lands near the railroad, forming new towns and providing the economic activity needed to support the railroad itself.

The original intent was to build a railroad from the river port of Wyandotte City (now Kansas City), west to Fort Riley, then up the Republican River northwest to join the Union Pacific main line at Fort Kearny in Nebraska. This course avoided the Cheyenne main buffalo hunting grounds. The company began construction on its main line westward from Kansas City in September 1863. In 1864, the first 40 miles (64 km) of the line to Lawrence was in operation. In the fall of 1866, the line had reached Junction City, which became the end of the first division of the railroad and where a roundhouse was constructed.

However, as the tracks reached Junction City, it became clear that the Union Pacific Railroad would win the race to Fort Kearny and the 100th meridian. Moreover, citizens in Denver in the Colorado Territory, eager to be connected to the national network, lobbied furiously to extend the rail lines to their city. For these reasons the Kansas Pacific surveyed a new course to Denver along the Smoky Hill Trail.

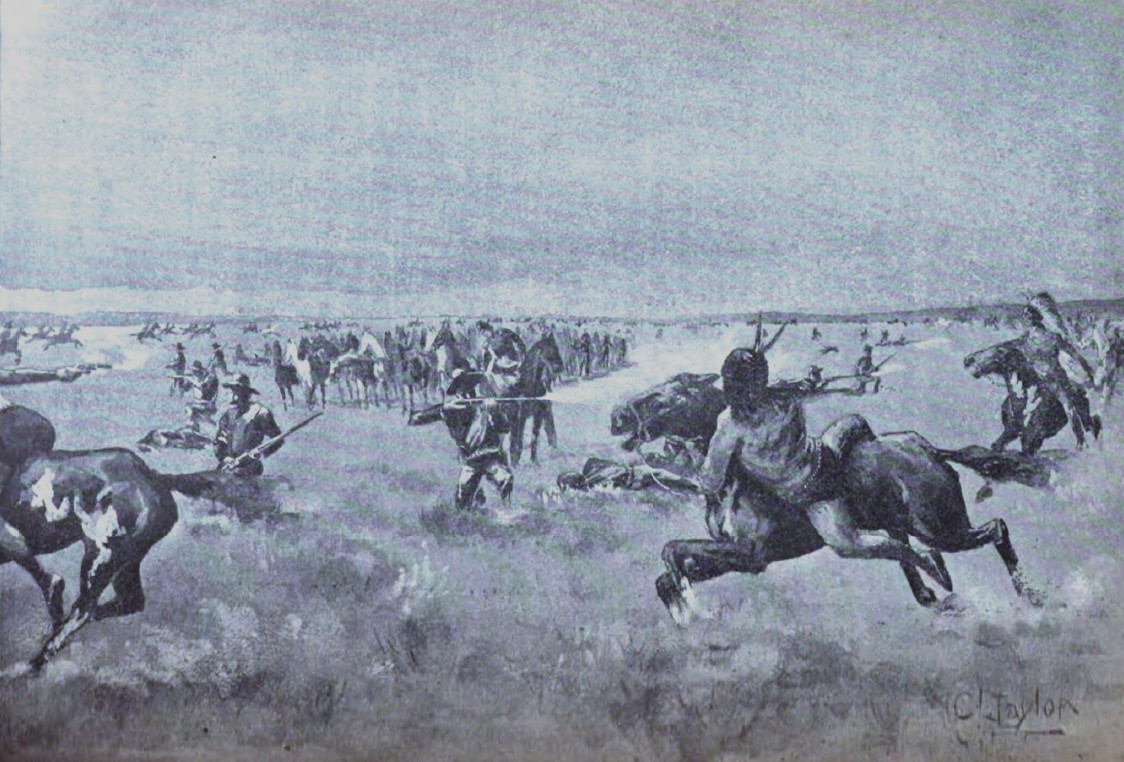
Battle of the Saline River between Cheyenne Dog Soldiers and the 10th Cavalry (Buffalo Soldiers) (C. Taylor, 1911)

Thus, changing course in 1867, the construction progressed through Salina to Fort Hays. Considering this an act of trespass, Cheyenne Dog Soldiers began raiding construction camps, damaging equipment, and stealing horses and mules. On August 1st, a raid on Campbell's grading camp killed 7 workers, prompting a response by the 10th Cavalry Regiment. The ensuing August 2nd Battle of the Saline River was the first action of the Buffalo Soldiers.

The escalation of raids on survey parties and construction camps drove all workers into Rome, the short-lived townsite founded by William Cody. Work was halted west of Hays City for two years as the region witnessed Battle of Beaver Creek, Battle of the Washita River, Battle of Beecher Island, and Battle of Summit Springs. It was during this time that William Cody became famous as a buffalo hunter for the railroad and as a scout for the U.S. Army, winning the name "Buffalo Bill".

It was also at this time that famous Civil War photographer Alexander Gardner was contracted by the railroad to photograph the line for promotional purposes. With the hostilities delaying his journey, he made several photographs of the end of track, including his famous Westward The Course of Empire Takes Its Way. Taken days before the signing of the Medicine Lodge Treaty (wherein the tribes had consented to permit the railroad) the image shows a construction party at end-of-track, which was then only a couple miles west of Hays City. By the time of these photographs (mid/late-October, 1867) Rome had been largely abandoned in favor of the permanent settlement of Hays City. Included in several pictures of this location around Hays City is his escort detachment from the 38th Infantry Regiment. With winter approaching, the Indians retired to winter camps, enabling Gardener was able to continue his journey to photograph the Southwest territories.

In 1868, the U.S. Congress enacted a law that was signed by President Andrew Johnson to build a second-phase extension of the line to the Rocky Mountains, with the intention of continuing past Denver through the Rocky Mountains to the Pacific, to compete with the Union Pacific main line. No funds were granted for the construction, however, a situation made more dire by the general collapse in railroad investments following the end of the American Civil War.

With the end of combat in 1869, construction continued from Hays City to Sheridan, Kansas. Then, with the backing of German investors, construction continued on into Colorado in October 1869. By March 1870, the westward line had reached Kit Carson, Colorado, and the company began to build eastward from Denver. On August 15, 1870, the two KP branches met on the Colorado Eastern Plains at Comanche Crossing, which was renamed Strasburg in honor of an engineer of the Kansas Pacific.

The arrival of the first trains to Denver in August was two months after the completion in June 1870 of the Denver Pacific Railway main line linking Denver with the Union Pacific at Cheyenne in the Wyoming Territory. The Kansas Pacific and Denver Pacific lines intersected at the Denver "Jersey Junction", approximately three miles north of downtown. The Strasburg "joining of the rails" of the Kansas Pacific on August 15, 1870, actually marked the completion of a true coast-to-coast railway network in the United States. The golden spike event in Utah the previous year had marked the linking of the Union Pacific with the Central Pacific Railroad, but until 1872, passengers were required to disembark between Council Bluffs, Iowa, and Omaha, Nebraska, to cross the Missouri River by boat.

In 1873, another famous Civil War photographer, Robert Benecke published his contracted promotional photographs of the railroad.

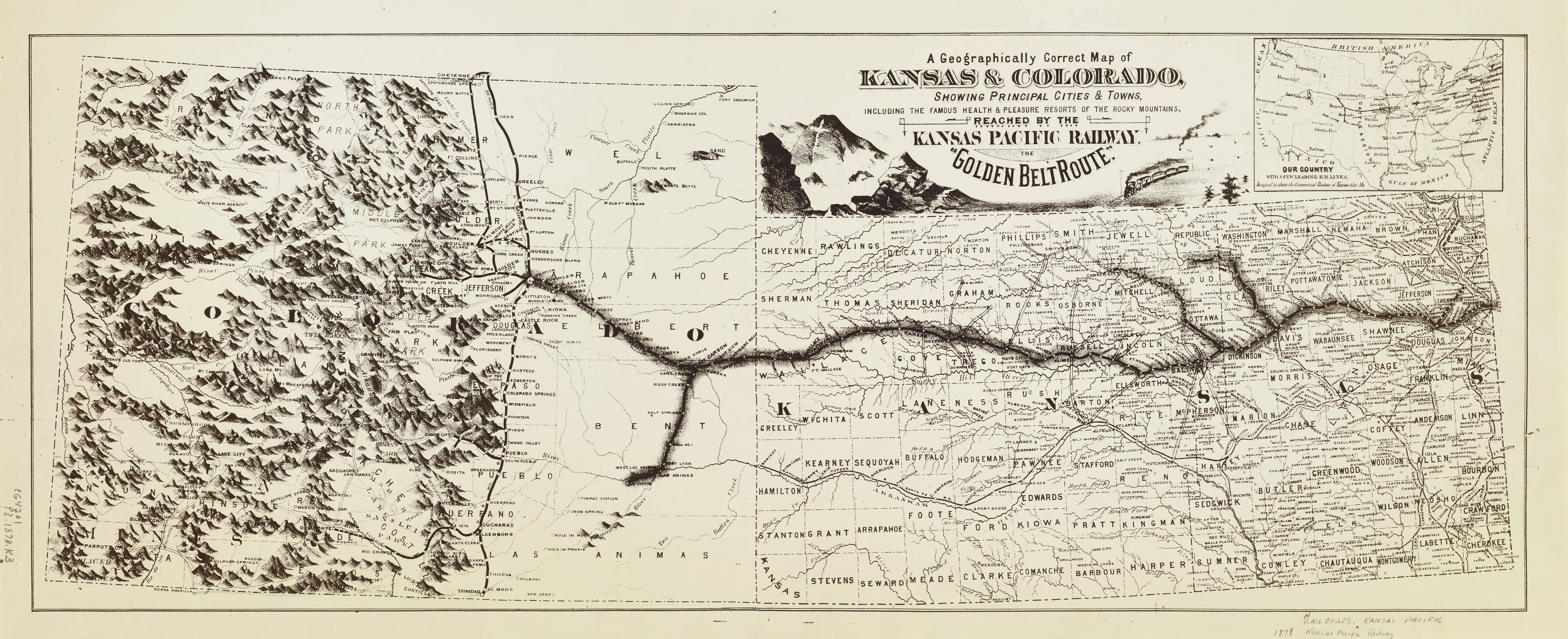
A 1878 map shows principal cities and towns along the railroad.

In 1874, Union Pacific investor Jay Gould gained effective control of the Kansas Pacific. In 1880, the Kansas Pacific and the Denver Pacific were consolidated at Gould's direction into the Union Pacific. The company's intention to extend the old Kansas Pacific mainline through the Rockies was strengthened by renewed competition from its archrival, the Chicago, Burlington and Quincy. In the early 1880s, the Union Pacific sent surveyors on several expeditions up the Platte Canyon and the Poudre Canyon. When the Burlington withdrew its plans for its own transcontinental line, however, the Union Pacific lost interest in extending a line west from Denver. It was not until 1934, with the completion of the Dotsero Cutoff, connecting the mainline of the Denver and Salt Lake Railroad with the Denver and Rio Grande Western mainline, that the standard gauge rail network west from Denver would cross the Rockies and reach Salt Lake City.

In 1885, the railroad went before the Supreme Court in Kansas Pacific R. Co. v. Dunmeyer in a dispute over land titles.

== Representation in fiction ==
The struggle to build the railway against the backdrop of the American Civil War was depicted in the 1953 western movie Kansas Pacific, starring Sterling Hayden and Eve Miller.

In Superman (1978 film), Lois Lane as a girl is shown riding with her parents on a Kansas Pacific passenger train through Smallville, Kansas, boyhood home of Clark Kent.

== See also ==
- Grey Beard, Southern Cheyenne chief who fought to prevent construction of the railroad
- Railroad land grants in the United States
- Perry, Kansas, named after railroad president
