= Butterfield Overland Despatch =

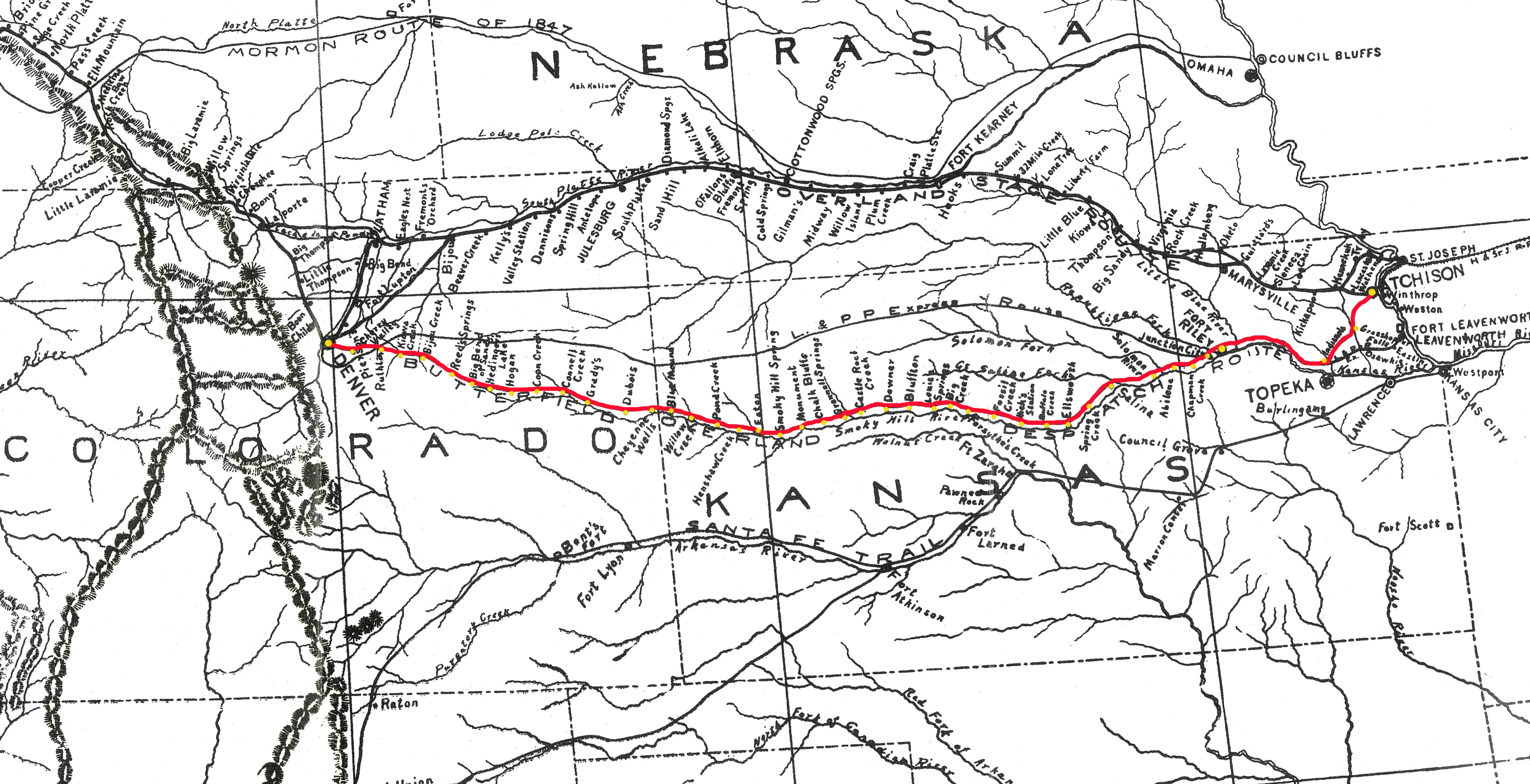
Route of the Butterfield Overland Despatch is highlighted in red

The Butterfield Overland Despatch was a mail and freight service operating across the Great Plains of America in the 1860s.

Due to increased travel to Colorado after the discovery of gold in 1858, David A. Butterfield, backed by New York capital, organized a joint-stock express and passenger carrying service between the Missouri River and Denver. In July 1865, the route via the Smoky Hill River was surveyed and soon thereafter coaches were in operation. Ben Holladay, acting for a competing organization, bought the Butterfield Overland Despatch in March 1866, when Eastern express companies threatened to take it over and establish a service between the Missouri River and Sacramento, California.

== See also ==
- Pond Creek Station, a preserved station of the company, built in 1865, near Wallace, Kansas
