= George Augustus Armes =

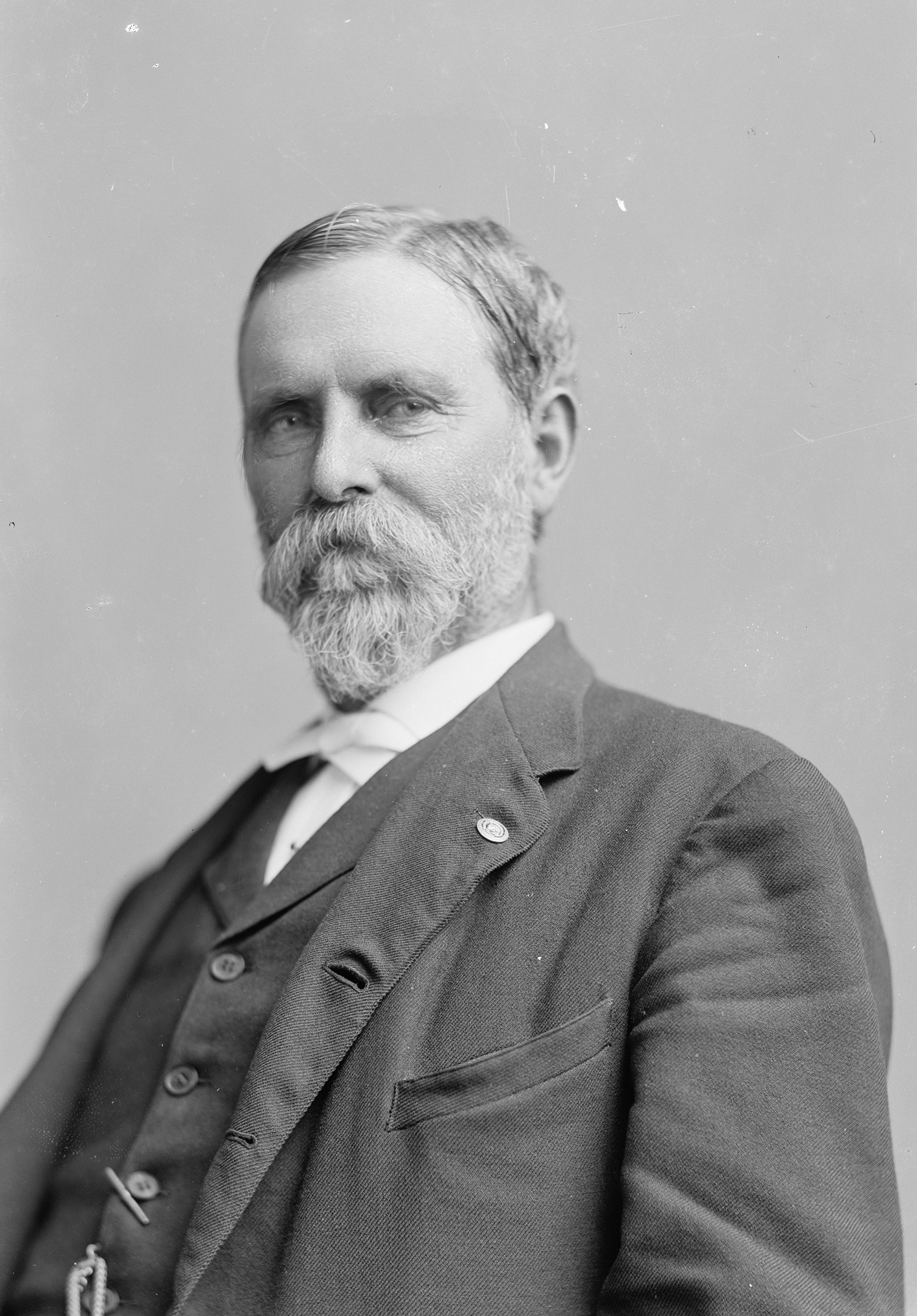
Armes, c. 1904

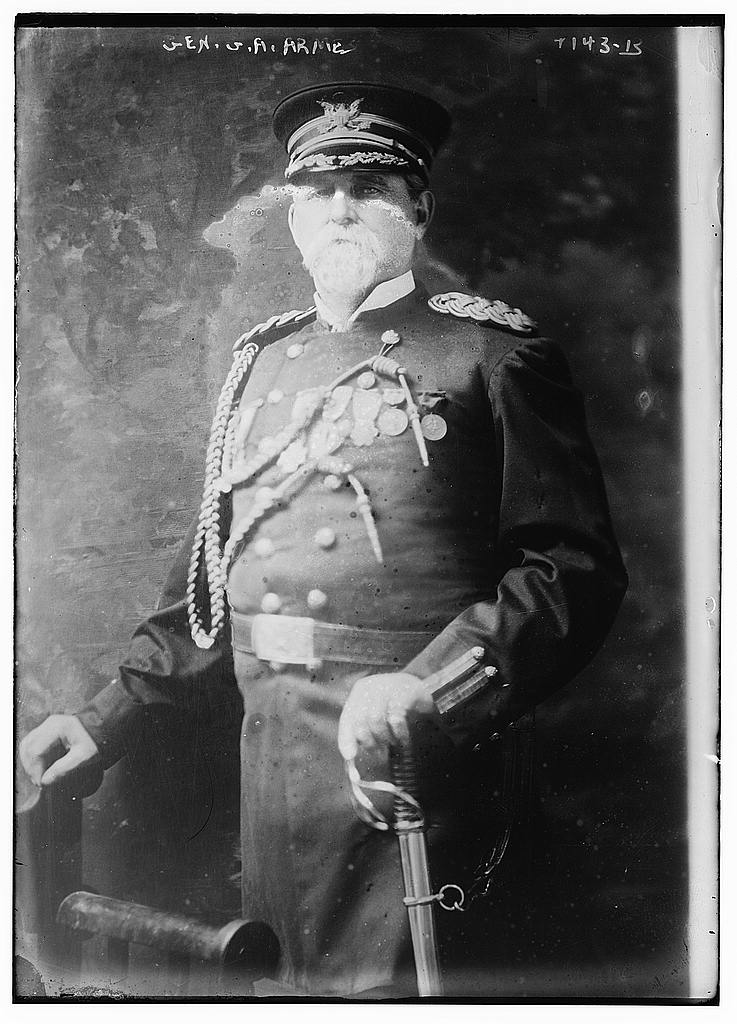
Armes in 1917

George Augustus Armes (May 29, 1844 – December 18, 1919) was a United States Army officer on the staff of Winfield Scott Hancock who commanded Buffalo Soldiers in the Battle of the Saline River and subsequent engagements. He was court-martialed three times.

== Biography ==
Armes was born in Fairfax, Virginia, on May 29, 1844, to Josiah Orcutt Armes and Caroline Olive Older.

He fought in the American Civil War on the side of the Union Army. He participated in the Battle of the Saline River on August 2, 1867. He married Lucy Hamilton Kerr (1851–1927), daughter of John Bozman Kerr, on October 14, 1874. They had eight children, among them, the writer Ethel Armes. They eventually divorced.

In later life, he became a real estate broker who gave his name to Armesleigh Park, a residential development in the Washington, D.C., neighborhood of Tenleytown. He purchased the land that would become the development in 1890 and sold it in 1892.

In 1890, Armes became affiliated with the Chevy Chase Land Company, Francis G. Newlands, and the so-called “California Syndicate” of bankers and politicians from San Francisco. A March 1, 1890, article in the Washington Evening Star, “The Big Real Estate Deal,” said, “The extended real estate purchases [958 acres of land] along the line of Connecticut Avenue extended, which have been made through real estate broker Maj. George A. Armes for the California Syndicate, represent an expenditure of over a million and a half dollars. This immense deal is now being consummated as rapidly as the titles can be searched and the deeds made out”.

In 1900, Armes wrote a memoir, Ups & Downs of an Army Officer. In 1902, he was shot by his former tenant. He married Marie Atkinson on December 24, 1910, in Philadelphia.

Armes died on December 18, 1919, in Ventnor City, New Jersey.
