= Wallace, Kansas =

City in Wallace County, Kansas

- City
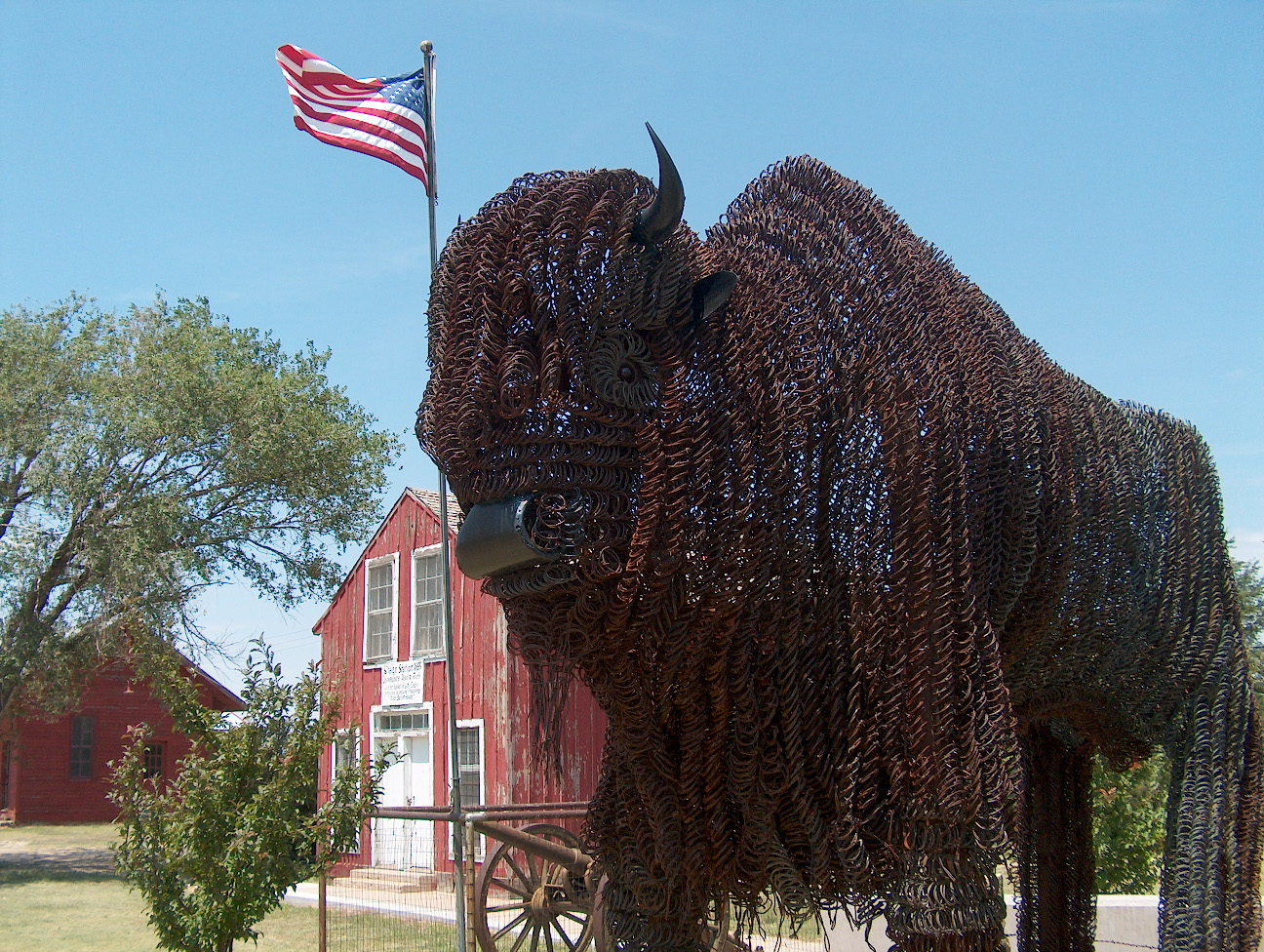
- Barbed-wire buffalo sculpture stands in front of the Fort Wallace Museum (2006)

- Location within Wallace County and Kansas

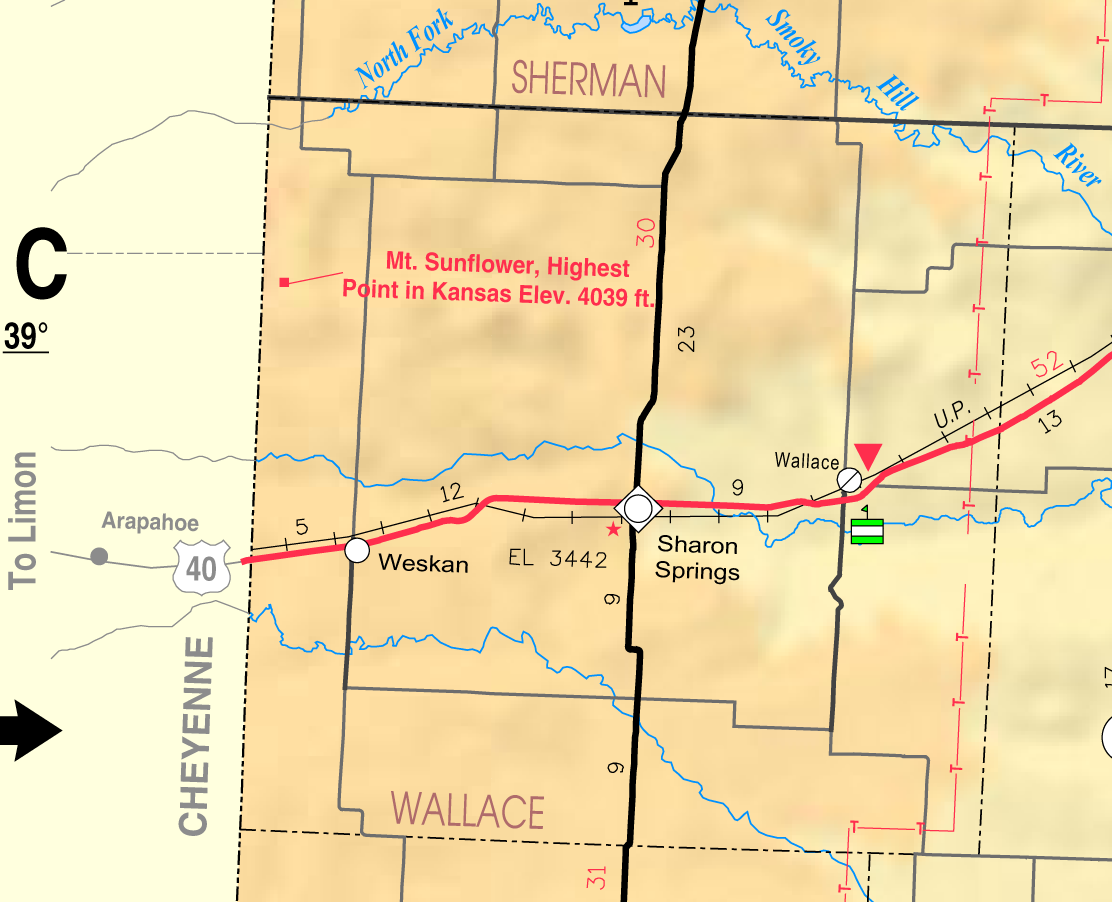
- KDOT map of Wallace County (legend)
- Coordinates: 38°54′46″N 101°35′35″W
- Country: United States
- State: Kansas
- County: Wallace
- Founded: 1870s
- Incorporated: 1887
- Named for: Fort Wallace

Area
  - Total: 0.40 sq mi (1.04 km^{2})
  - Land: 0.40 sq mi (1.04 km^{2})
  - Water: 0 sq mi (0.00 km^{2})
- Elevation: 3,314 ft (1,010 m)

Population (2020)
  - Total: 41
  - Density: 100/sq mi (39/km^{2})
- Time zone: UTC-7 (Mountain (MST))
  - Summer (DST): UTC-6 (MDT)
- ZIP Code: 67761
- Area code: 785
- FIPS code: 20-74750
- GNIS ID: 2397178
- Website: Info

Wallace is a city in Wallace County, Kansas, United States. As of the 2020 census, the population of the city was 41.

== History ==
In the early 1870s, the city began after the establishment of Fort Wallace, ordered built by General William Tecumseh Sherman.

The first post office in Wallace was established in August 1872.

== Geography ==
According to the United States Census Bureau, the city has a total area of 0.40 square miles (1.04 km^{2}), all land.

=== Climate ===
According to the Köppen Climate Classification system, Wallace has a semi-arid climate, abbreviated "BSk" on climate maps.

Climate data for Wallace, Kansas, 1991–2020 normals, extremes 1903–present
| Month | Jan | Feb | Mar | Apr | May | Jun | Jul | Aug | Sep | Oct | Nov | Dec | Year |
|---|---|---|---|---|---|---|---|---|---|---|---|---|---|
| Record high °F (°C) | 80 (27) | 86 (30) | 98 (37) | 96 (36) | 102 (39) | 112 (44) | 112 (44) | 109 (43) | 106 (41) | 102 (39) | 89 (32) | 82 (28) | 112 (44) |
| Mean maximum °F (°C) | 69.0 (20.6) | 72.3 (22.4) | 82.8 (28.2) | 89.0 (31.7) | 95.4 (35.2) | 102.9 (39.4) | 104.1 (40.1) | 102.4 (39.1) | 98.4 (36.9) | 90.9 (32.7) | 79.5 (26.4) | 67.9 (19.9) | 105.6 (40.9) |
| Mean daily maximum °F (°C) | 44.6 (7.0) | 47.1 (8.4) | 57.6 (14.2) | 65.7 (18.7) | 75.2 (24.0) | 86.8 (30.4) | 92.1 (33.4) | 89.6 (32.0) | 81.9 (27.7) | 68.7 (20.4) | 55.4 (13.0) | 45.2 (7.3) | 67.5 (19.7) |
| Daily mean °F (°C) | 29.9 (−1.2) | 32.3 (0.2) | 41.3 (5.2) | 50.1 (10.1) | 60.5 (15.8) | 71.9 (22.2) | 77.4 (25.2) | 75.0 (23.9) | 66.4 (19.1) | 52.6 (11.4) | 40.0 (4.4) | 30.8 (−0.7) | 52.4 (11.3) |
| Mean daily minimum °F (°C) | 15.3 (−9.3) | 17.5 (−8.1) | 25.1 (−3.8) | 34.6 (1.4) | 45.7 (7.6) | 57.1 (13.9) | 62.6 (17.0) | 60.4 (15.8) | 51.0 (10.6) | 36.6 (2.6) | 24.7 (−4.1) | 16.4 (−8.7) | 37.2 (2.9) |
| Mean minimum °F (°C) | −3.4 (−19.7) | −0.1 (−17.8) | 8.8 (−12.9) | 20.7 (−6.3) | 31.1 (−0.5) | 44.2 (6.8) | 53.9 (12.2) | 50.6 (10.3) | 36.7 (2.6) | 20.6 (−6.3) | 8.0 (−13.3) | −3.4 (−19.7) | −8.9 (−22.7) |
| Record low °F (°C) | −23 (−31) | −25 (−32) | −10 (−23) | 8 (−13) | 14 (−10) | 32 (0) | 42 (6) | 37 (3) | 23 (−5) | 2 (−17) | −6 (−21) | −22 (−30) | −25 (−32) |
| Average precipitation inches (mm) | 0.37 (9.4) | 0.54 (14) | 0.97 (25) | 1.79 (45) | 2.88 (73) | 2.65 (67) | 3.93 (100) | 3.49 (89) | 1.52 (39) | 1.49 (38) | 0.55 (14) | 0.55 (14) | 20.73 (527.4) |
| Average snowfall inches (cm) | 2.9 (7.4) | 5.4 (14) | 3.1 (7.9) | 1.8 (4.6) | 1.0 (2.5) | 0.0 (0.0) | 0.0 (0.0) | 0.0 (0.0) | 0.0 (0.0) | 0.9 (2.3) | 2.7 (6.9) | 5.4 (14) | 23.2 (59.6) |
| Average extreme snow depth inches (cm) | 3.6 (9.1) | 4.8 (12) | 2.3 (5.8) | 0.7 (1.8) | 0.8 (2.0) | 0.0 (0.0) | 0.0 (0.0) | 0.0 (0.0) | 0.0 (0.0) | 0.5 (1.3) | 2.1 (5.3) | 3.9 (9.9) | 7.8 (20) |
| Average precipitation days (≥ 0.01 in) | 3.5 | 4.5 | 4.8 | 7.2 | 8.8 | 8.0 | 8.2 | 8.3 | 5.6 | 5.2 | 3.1 | 4.3 | 71.5 |
| Average snowy days (≥ 0.1 in) | 2.6 | 3.6 | 2.2 | 1.2 | 0.1 | 0.0 | 0.0 | 0.0 | 0.0 | 0.7 | 1.7 | 3.3 | 15.4 |
Source 1: NOAA
Source 2: National Weather Service

== Demographics ==
Historical population
| Census | Pop. | Note | %± |
|---|---|---|---|
| 1880 | 173 | | — |
| 1890 | 220 | | 27.2% |
| 1940 | 102 | | — |
| 1950 | 111 | | 8.8% |
| 1960 | 110 | | −0.9% |
| 1970 | 112 | | 1.8% |
| 1980 | 86 | | −23.2% |
| 1990 | 75 | | −12.8% |
| 2000 | 67 | | −10.7% |
| 2010 | 57 | | −14.9% |
| 2020 | 41 | | −28.1% |
U.S. Decennial Census

=== 2010 census ===
As of the census of 2010, there were 57 people, 24 households, and 16 families residing in the city. The population density was 142.5 inhabitants per square mile (55.0/km^{2}). There were 32 housing units at an average density of 80.0 per square mile (30.9/km^{2}). The racial makeup of the city was 100.0% White.

There were 24 households, of which 29.2% had children under the age of 18 living with them, 58.3% were married couples living together, 8.3% had a female householder with no husband present, and 33.3% were non-families. 29.2% of all households were made up of individuals, and 12.5% had someone living alone who was 65 years of age or older. The average household size was 2.38 and the average family size was 3.00.

The median age in the city was 49.6 years. 24.6% of residents were under the age of 18; 5.3% were between the ages of 18 and 24; 12.3% were from 25 to 44; 40.3% were from 45 to 64; and 17.5% were 65 years of age or older. The gender makeup of the city was 45.6% male and 54.4% female.

=== 2000 census ===
As of the census of 2000, there were 67 people, 30 households, and 17 families residing in the city. The population density was 166.7 inhabitants per square mile (64.4/km^{2}). There were 35 housing units at an average density of 87.1 per square mile (33.6/km^{2}). The racial makeup of the city was 100.00% White. Hispanic or Latino of any race were 1.49% of the population.

There were 30 households, out of which 33.3% had children under the age of 18 living with them, 43.3% were married couples living together, 13.3% had a female householder with no husband present, and 43.3% were non-families. 43.3% of all households were made up of individuals, and 23.3% had someone living alone who was 65 years of age or older. The average household size was 2.23 and the average family size was 3.06.

In the city, the population was spread out, with 26.9% under the age of 18, 3.0% from 18 to 24, 17.9% from 25 to 44, 25.4% from 45 to 64, and 26.9% who were 65 years of age or older. The median age was 48 years. For every 100 females, there were 91.4 males. For every 100 females age 18 and over, there were 88.5 males.

The median income for a household in the city was $13,125, and the median income for a family was $35,000. Males had a median income of $43,750 versus $33,750 for females. The per capita income for the city was $16,005. There were 28.6% of families and 29.3% of the population living below the poverty line, including 38.5% of under eighteens and 19.2% of those over 64.
