= Big Creek =

Big Creek may refer to:

== In Australia ==
- Big Creek, Tasmania, a tributary of the Inglis River in Tasmania, Australia

== In Belize ==
- Big Creek, Belize, a sea port in Belize

== In Canada ==
- Big Creek (British Columbia), a tributary of the Chilcotin River
- Big Creek Provincial Park, a British Columbia Provincial Park
- Big Creek, British Columbia, a locality and former post office in the Chilcotin District of British Columbia
- Big Creek (Lake Erie), empties into Lake Erie at Port Rowan

== In the United States ==
Alphabetical by state

- Big Creek Lake, formed by damming the Big Creek in southwest Alabama
- Big Creek, California, an unincorporated town in Fresno County
- Big Creek (San Joaquin River), a tributary of the San Joaquin River in California
- Big Creek CCD, Georgia, an unincorporated community in Forsyth County, Georgia
- Big Creek (Georgia), a tributary of the Chattahoochee River
- Big Creek, Idaho, an unincorporated community in Shoshone County
- Big Creek (Des Moines River), a main tributary of the Des Moines River in Iowa
- Big Creek (Kansas), a tributary of the Smoky Hill River
- Big Creek (Perry, Kentucky), a tributary of the North Fork of the Kentucky River
- Big Creek, Kentucky, a tributary of the Red Bird River fork of the South Fork of the Kentucky River
- Big Creek (Kentucky), a tributary of the Tug Fork of the Big Sandy River
- Big Creek (Union Parish, LA), a creek near Marion, Louisiana
- Big Creek (Marshyhope Creek tributary), a stream in Dorchester County, Maryland
- Big Creek, Mississippi, a village in Calhoun County
- Big Creek, Missouri, an unincorporated community
- Big Creek (Castor River tributary), a stream in Missouri
- Big Creek (Cuivre River tributary), a stream in Missouri
- Big Creek (Current River tributary), a stream in Texas and western Shannon counties of Missouri
- Big Creek (Current River East), a stream in Dent, Reynolds and northeast Shannon counties of Missouri
- Big Creek (South Grand River tributary), a stream in Missouri
- Big Creek (Salt River tributary), a stream in Missouri
- Big Creek (St. Francis River), a stream in Missouri
- Big Creek (Northwest Missouri), a stream in Missouri
- Big Creek (Oriskany Creek tributary), a stream in Oneida County, New York
- Big Creek (Cuyahoga River), a tributary of the Cuyahoga River in Northeast Ohio
- Big Creek (Geauga County, Ohio), a stream in Northeast Ohio
- Big Creek (Lane County, Oregon), a stream flowing directly into the Pacific Ocean
- Big Creek Bridge (Oregon)
- Big Creek (Beech River tributary), a stream in Tennessee
- Big Creek (Trinity River), a tributary of the Trinity River (Texas)
- Big Creek High School, in War, West Virginia
- Big Creek (Wisconsin), a stream in Sauk County
- Landels-Hill Big Creek Reserve, a natural reserve in Big Sur, California

== See also ==
- Big Creek Township (disambiguation)
