= Yocemento, Kansas =

Unincorporated community in Ellis County, Kansas

- Unincorporated community
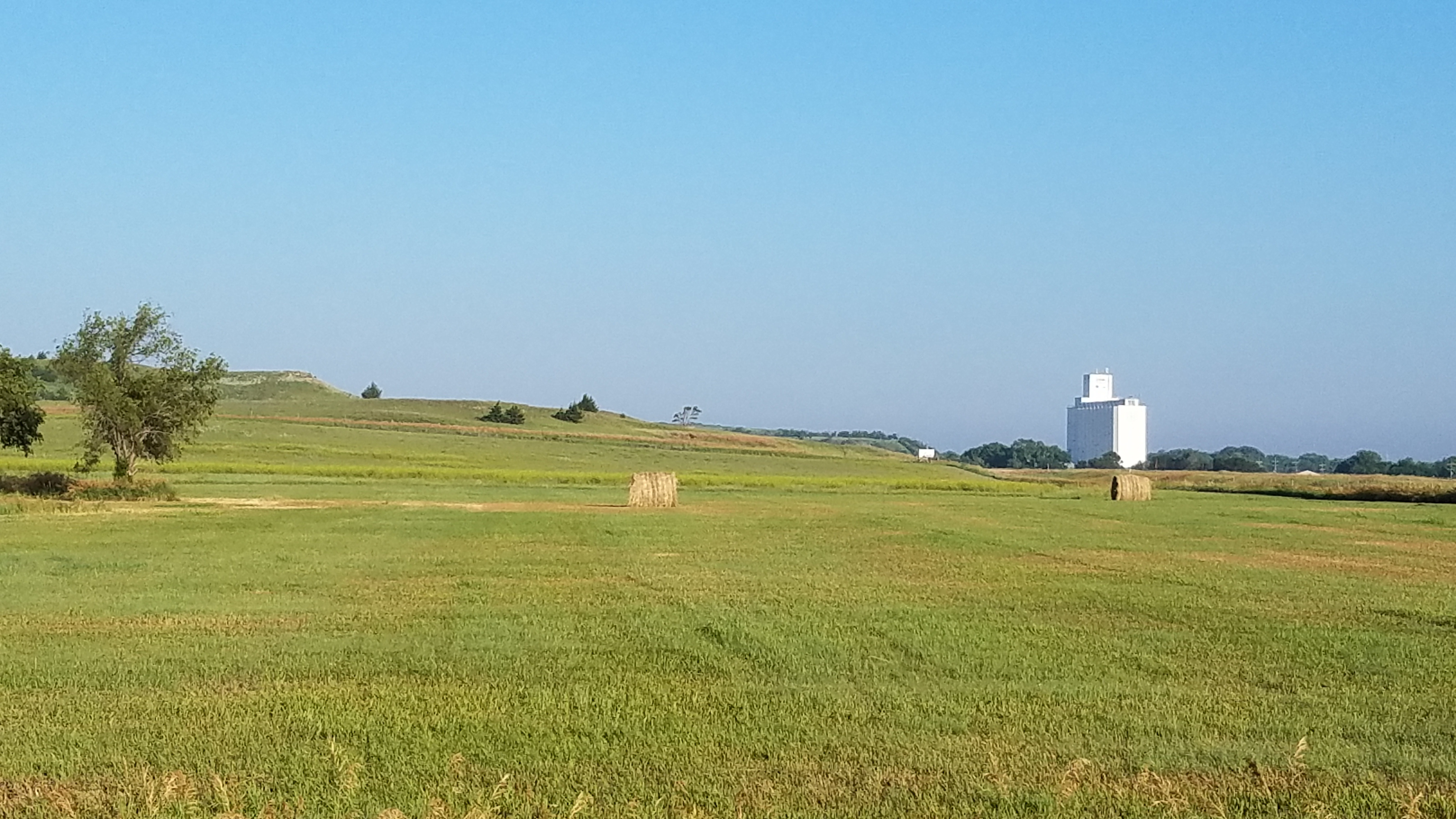
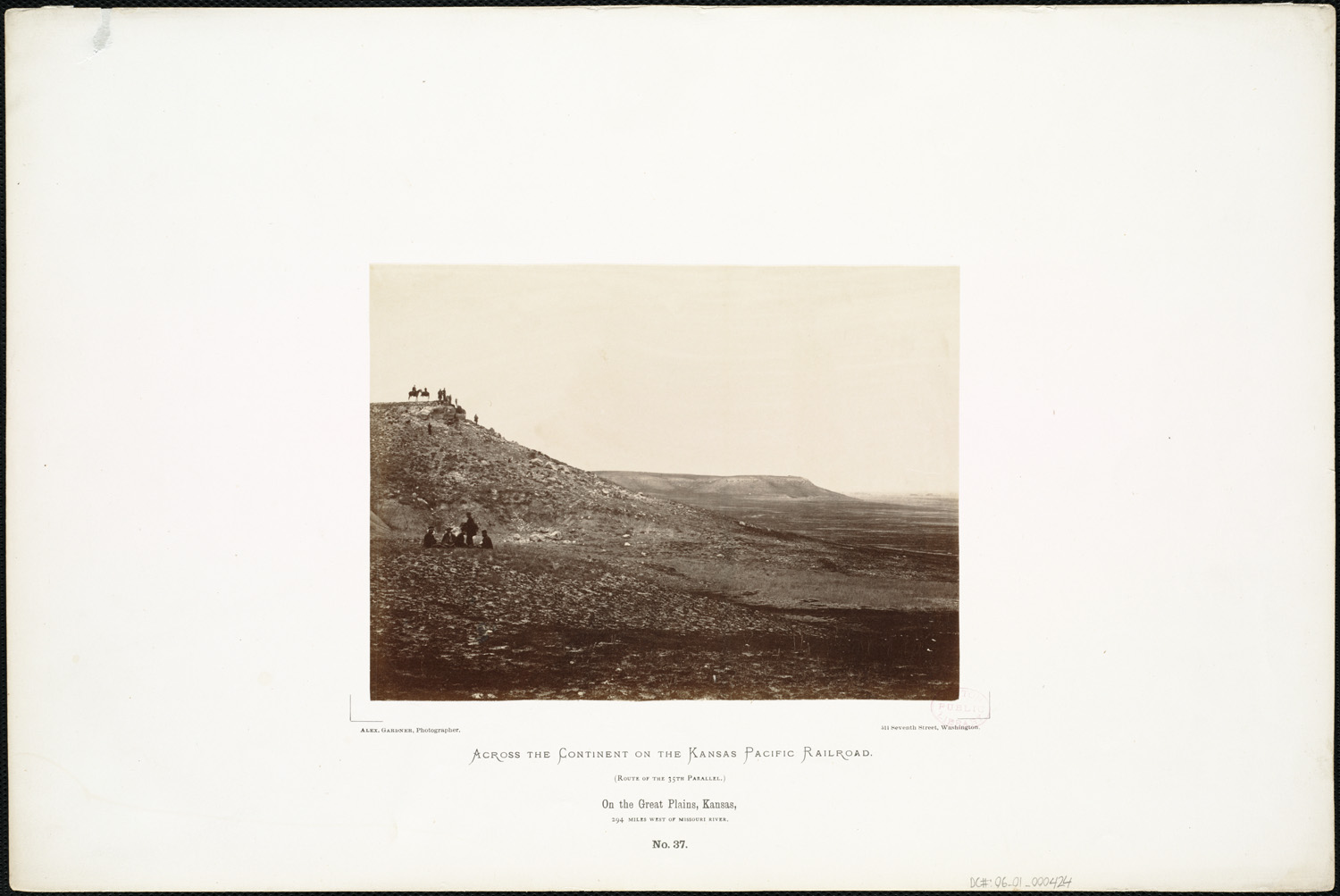
- Yocemento and the bluffs that gave rise to its brief industry Alexander Gardner's 1867 photograph of the same bluffs over the future Yocemento townsite

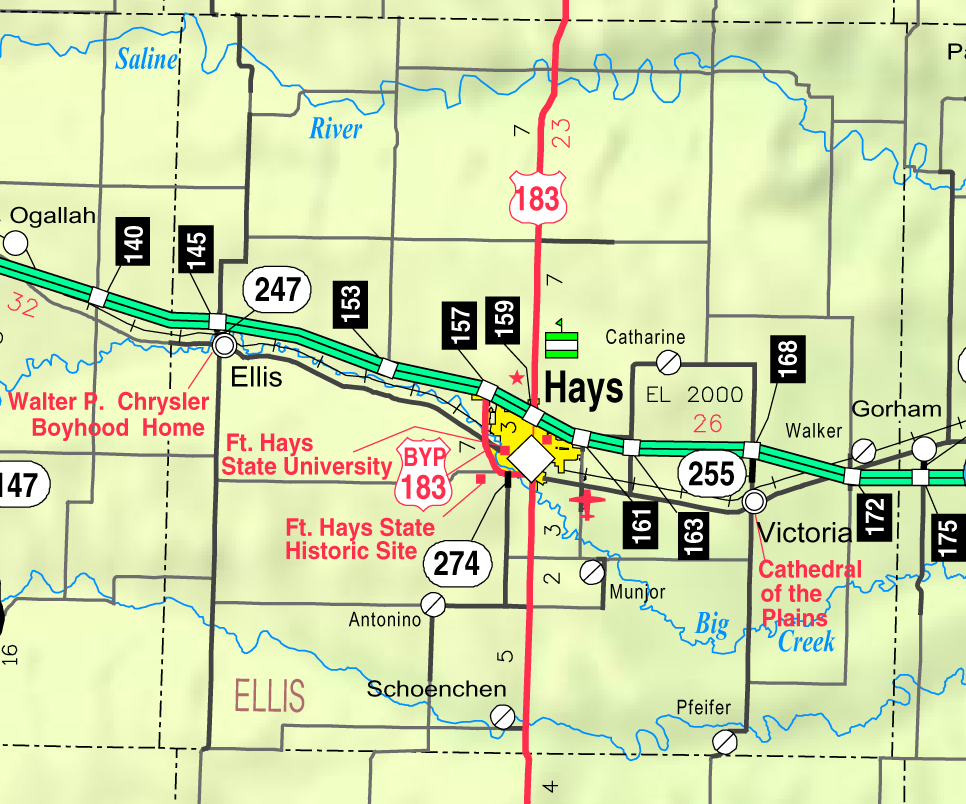
- KDOT map of Ellis County (legend)

- Location within Kansas Location within the United States
- Coordinates: 38°54′26″N 99°25′26″W
- Country: United States
- State: Kansas
- County: Ellis
- Township: Big Creek
- Founded: 1906
- Platted: 1907
- Elevation: 2,051 ft (625 m)
- Time zone: UTC-6 (CST)
  - Summer (DST): UTC-5 (CDT)
- ZIP Code: 67601
- Area code: 785
- FIPS code: 20-80725
- GNIS ID: 484723

Yocemento is an unincorporated community in Big Creek Township, Ellis County, Kansas, United States. The settlement lies across the banks of Big Creek against the base of bluffs capped by massive limestone blocks, in which lies the 20th-century origin of the community.

The original settler name for the location was Hog Back, with a railway station first established there with that name in 1881. This station was later moved to Hog Back, Kansas. Hog Back was the local name for the high limestone and chalk ridge that runs from just west of old Fort Hays to Ellis. These bluffs are the local outcrop of the Fort Hays Limestone. Established in 1906 by business partners Erasmus Haworth, the first state geologist of Kansas, and I. M. Yost, leading businessman and miller of Hays, Yocemento is one of the several communities around the outskirts of the High Plains that were founded to use Fort Hays Limestone to manufacture Portland cement.

== History ==
=== Pre-American settlement ===
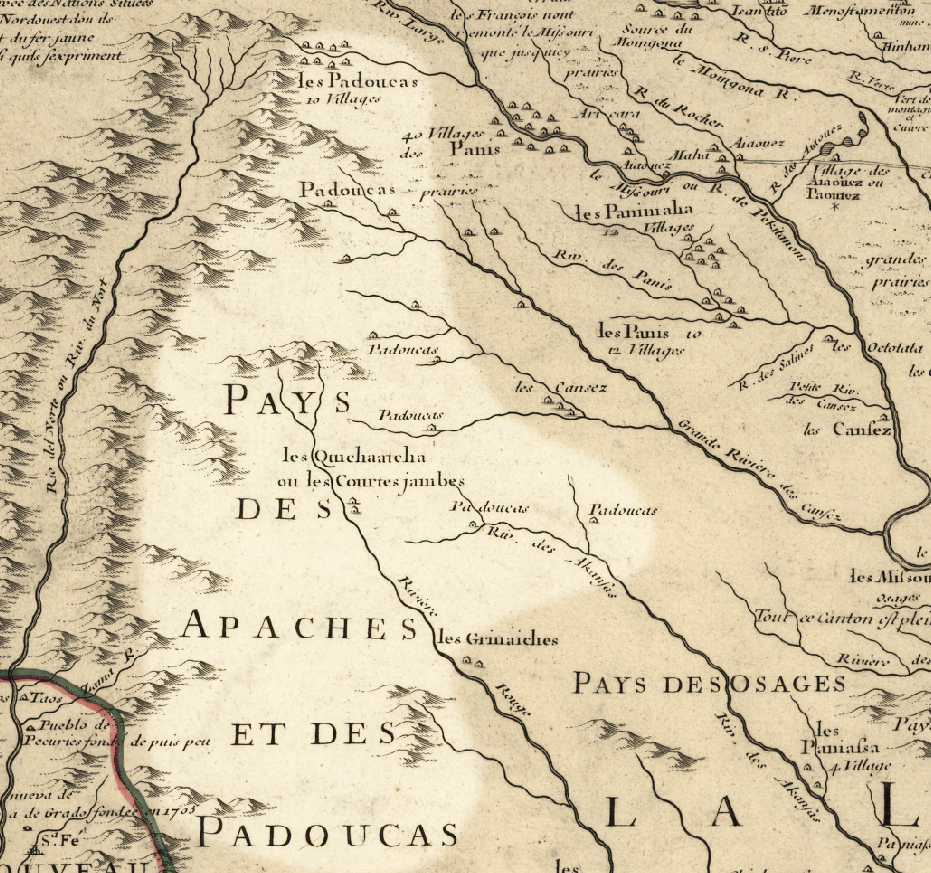
This 1718 Guillaume de L'Isle map shows Padoucas villages on the upper rivers of northwest Kansas (Cansez).

The earliest studied human occupation of the Yocemento location is a settlement interpreted as the rarely preserved Early Ceramic (c. 400–1100 CE) Keith phase of the Woodland culture. This phase is evidenced by particular shards of Harlan Cord-Roughened ceramic jars, chipped stone tools (including well-made, small, corner-notched arrowheads), charcoal, bone tools, and mussel shell middens found along the high, steep banks of Big Creek just west of Yocemento. Dating to about 1000 CE, it is interpreted as a butchering and tool working site: Animal bones include bison, deer, and small mammals. The on-site manufacture of stone tools included heat treatment of quartzite, flint, silicified Smoky Hill Chalk, and silcrete. Given that no evidence of permanent occupation has been found here, the site is considered to have been a warm season hunting camp.

Early 18th-century French cartographer Guillaume Delisle's map of the Mississippi River located Padoucas (Comanche) villages on the upper forks of the Kansas River (Big Creek lies between the Smoky Hill and Saline Rivers).

By the early 19th century, however, the Pawnee had a large seasonal hunting camp 11 miles to the south with the Pawnee Trail passing nearby to the east.

However, by the time of the first United States settlements here in the mid-19th century, the Pawnee had diminished and the general territory was under the claim of the Kiowa and Comanche to the south and west and, more significantly, the Cheyenne and Arapaho to the north and west.

=== Railroad construction and conflict ===
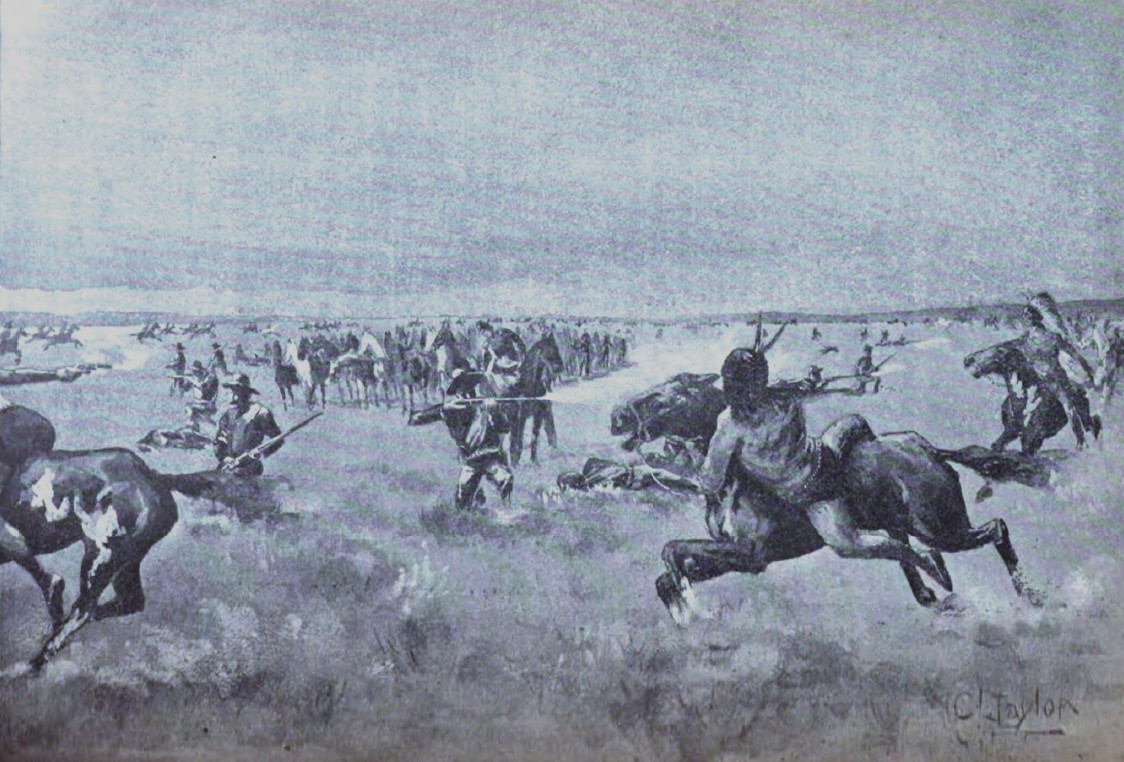
On August 2, 1867, conflict arose between the Dog Soldiers and the 10th Cavalry (Buffalo Soldiers) about 12 miles (19 km) north of future Yocemento. (C. Taylor, 1911)

In 1867, construction of the Kansas Pacific Railway west of Junction City precipitated conflict with the tribes that claimed this region of the High Plains as buffalo hunting grounds. The original public plan for the Kansas Pacific Railway (then UPED) was to follow the Kansas River to Fort Riley, and then progress up the Republican River to Fort Kearny in Nebraska. This course avoided the Cheyenne main buffalo hunting grounds. However, as the tracks reached Junction City, it became clear that the Union Pacific Railroad would win the race to Fort Kearny and the 100th meridian; so, the Kansas Pacific instead surveyed a new course to Denver along the Smoky Hill Trail. Even though the Smoky Hill Trail was more hazardous than either the Santa Fe Trail or Platte River routes, it was the most direct route from the East to Denver.

The rapid construction of track to Salina and up through the Smoky Hills, followed by the letting of contracts to extend railroad out on to the High Plains 100 miles (160 km) west of Ellsworth to Park's Fort, was perceived as a violation of Cheyenne and Arapaho territory. From July through August, Dog Soldiers attacked workers and settlers along the line of construction, including near Salina, Bunker Hill, and Wilson. On August 1, seven workers were killed at Campbell's grading camp (present-day Victoria). followed by the Battle of the Saline River the next day just 12 miles north of present day Yocemento. However, it was the September 20 attack on Park's Fort, 35 miles (56 km) west of Hays City, that caused a complete halt to surveying and construction west of Hays. Thousands of construction workers, surveyors, and early settlers retreated from the west to the weeks-old settlement of Rome. October construction east of Hays City brought the end-of-track just a few miles short of the future Yocemento site.

This situation was the context of the October 1867 photographs of the Yocemento location made by Alexander Gardner; all construction west of his pictures had halted due to the conflict, but was about to resume. One of these Gardner photographs, On the Great Plains, Kansas, 294 miles west of Missouri River (top-right), shows the attraction of the limestone-capped ridge what would draw the attention of future geologists and industrialists, two of whom would eventually create Yocemento there. Notable in the picture is the military escort in the foreground, detached from the 38th Infantry Regiment, reflecting the hostilities with the Cheyenne and allies in those months. Then based in Hays City (5 miles behind the photographer), Buffalo Bill passed over the distant Hog Back on his first hunting contracts. Major Armes had crossed this ridge just weeks before in mid-August with companies of the 10th Cavalry (negro) and the 18th Kansas Volunteer Cavalry (including ex-Confederates) to patrol the surveyed course of the railroad, there engaging large forces of Cheyenne. No construction is visible in this image even though as seen in the following Gardner image, the end of track is only a short distance behind the camera of this picture.

Another of the photographs taken near the location is the more famous image that Gardner titled Westward The Course of Empire Takes Its Way. Taken days before the signing of the Medicine Lodge Treaty (wherein the tribes had consented to permit the railroad) the image shows a construction party at end-of-track, which was then only a couple miles west of Hays City. By the time of these photographs (mid/late-October, 1867) Rome had been largely abandoned in favor of the permanent settlement of Hays City.

=== The railroad comes through ===
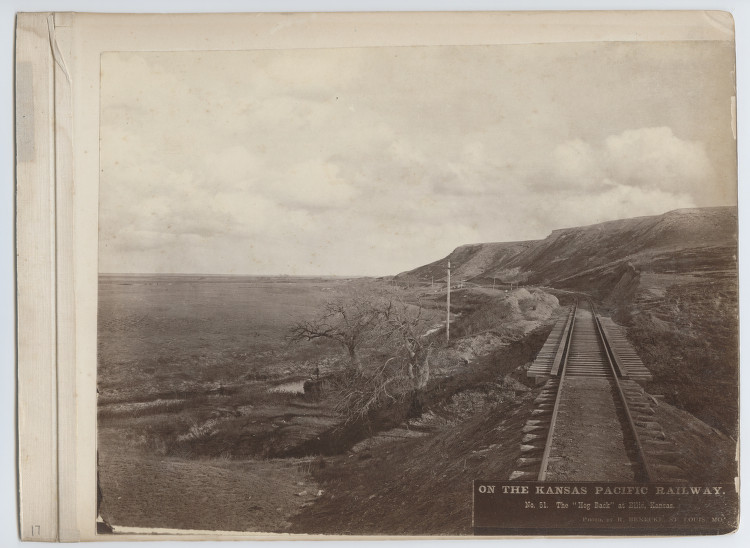
In 1873, Robert Benecke photographed the Yocemento bluff, then named Hog Back.

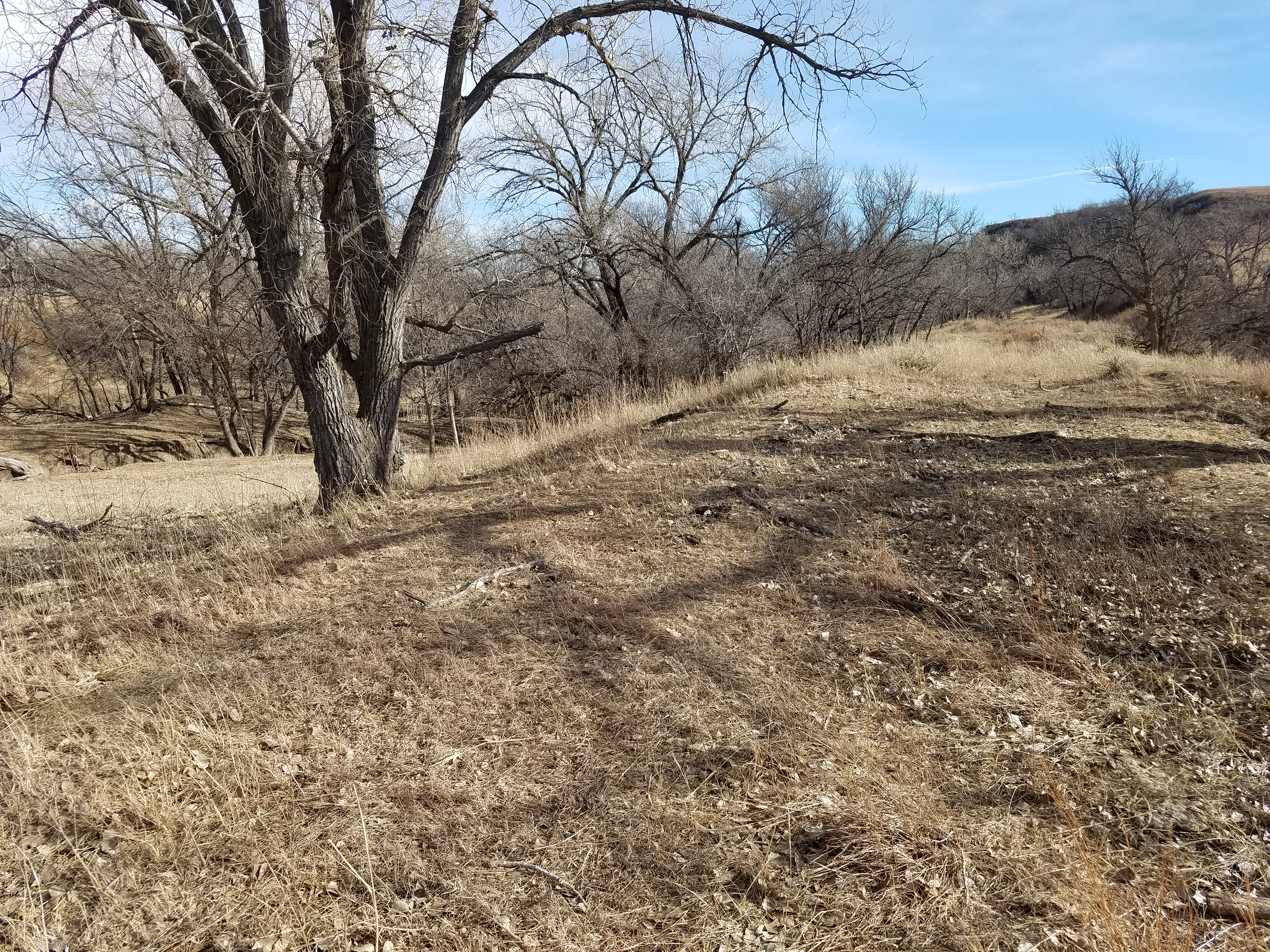
2016 reenactment of the Robert Benecke photo

The late-August and September battles on the Saline River, Solomon Forks, and tributaries of the Republican River ended the conflict west of the end of line for 1867. With the course of the railroad secured by the U. S. Army and the late-October signing of the Medicine Lodge Treaty, construction of the tracks west of Hays to Park's Fort resumed over the winter of 1867–1868, reaching that pump station before hostilities resumed in April 1868.

By the end of 1868, the hostilities in western Kansas had concluded and track had reached Sheridan. By 1870, track had reached Denver. The Kansas Pacific promoted settlement, outdoor sport, and tourism in Kansas and Colorado. Ellis had been founded and by 1873 had a Railway Hotel and roundhouse built of Fort Hays Limestone from the bluffs. Photographing these and other features of the rail line, Robert Benecke also photographed the Hog Back between Hays City and Ellis.

Invited to Rome by Buffalo Bill and anticipating the roles Western Kansas farmland and the railroad would play in hard wheat production, I. M. Yost arrived in Hays in 1877 and built the region's first flour mill at the Rome site.

=== Unsuitable for wheat farming ===
Hays City and Ellis were founded in 1867 and 1870, respectively. However, as fertile as the valley was, the Hog Back ridge of limestone and chalk between the two settlements was considered unsuitable for wheat farming and was initially rejected by immigrant settlers. By 1910, the local press referred to the hill as the "long neglected" Hog Back. Much of these hilltops remain largely in pasture.

=== Frontier geologists ===
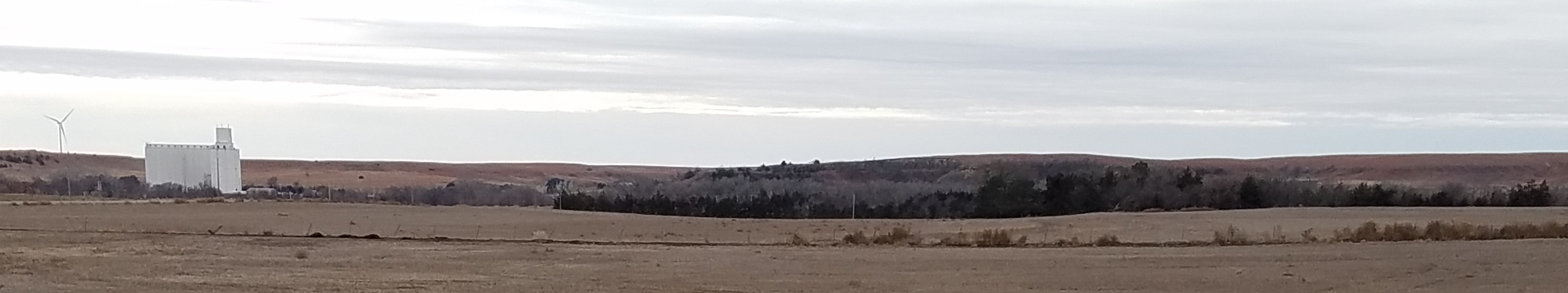
Yocemento and the Hog Back have exposed Fort Hays Limestone, and Benton Shale is 1 mile (1.6 km) north on Interstate 70.

Early frontier geologists were drawn to the monumental limestone bluffs in this location and the chalk exposures beyond. The original interest was in the mapping and study of Cretaceous fossils, this general area of the state becoming a part of the broader focus of the Bone Wars. F. V. Hayden studied the site in 1871. At the time, Big Creek was undercutting the face the bluff, exposing 60 feet (18 m) of "Benton Shale" normally covered by grass on other slopes.

=== U.S. Portland Cement Company ===
The United States Portland Cement Company was founded by partners Erasmus Haworth and I. M. Yost:

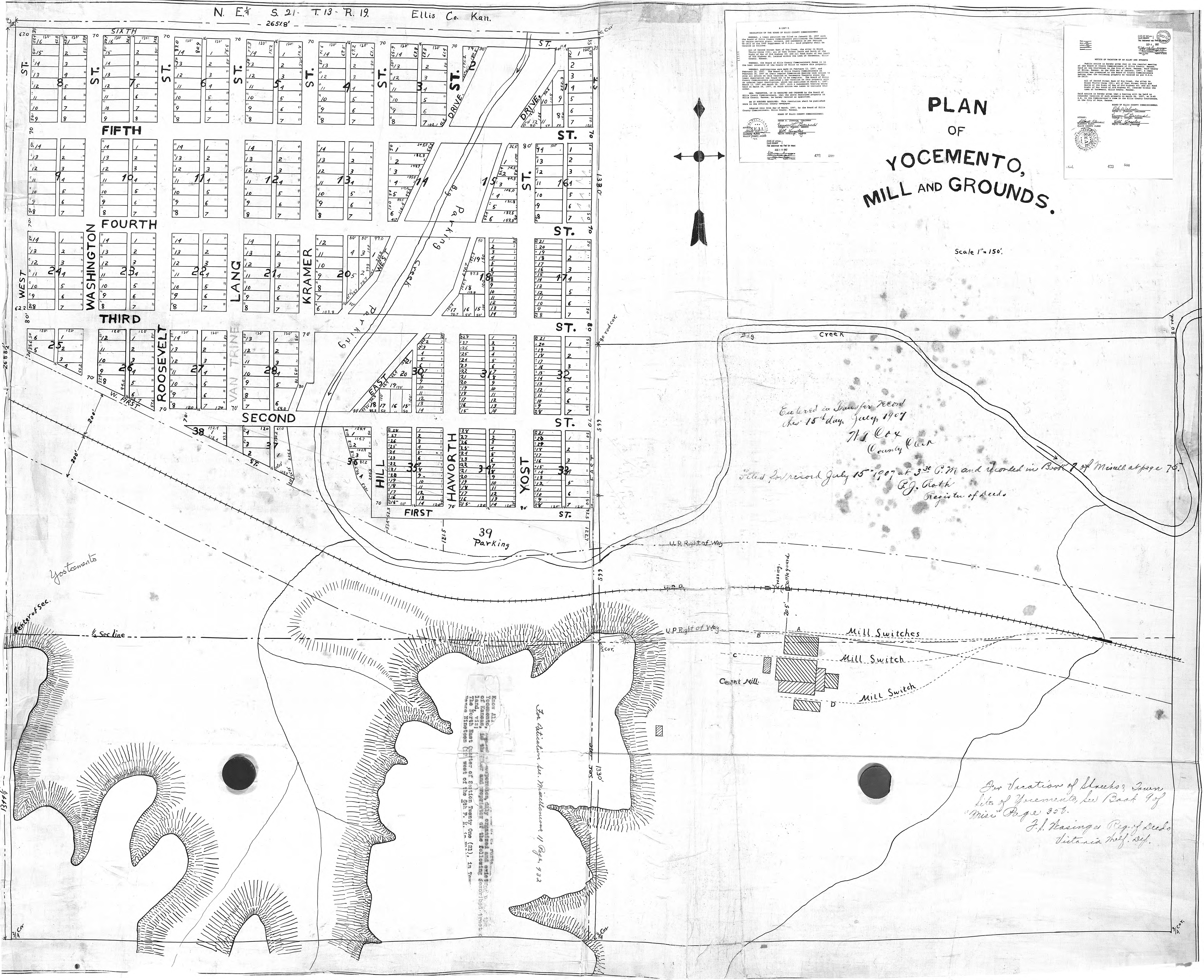
I. M. Yost's plan of the Yocemento townsite was near the mill under construction.

Erasmus Haworth was the founder and first president of the Kansas Geological Survey at the University of Kansas. He previously had been frustrated in Ellis County, unable to dissuade the 1890s gold rush hoax in the adjoining southern corners of Ellis and Trego Counties about 12 miles (19 km) south and west of present Yocemento (see Smoky Hill City and Chetolah). Accurately predicting the discovery of oil at the Yocemento site, he was later known as the "father of oil" in western Kansas.

I. M. Yost was a long-standing miller in Hays; a leading businessman not only of that community, but of early 1900s western Kansas. In the 1870s, he built the first of the flour mills that dotted the "Great American Desert" by the first decades of the 20th century.

In 1906, Erasmus Haworth was revising and enlarging his first geological map of Kansas and sought a guide for the area, saying years later, "I had heard of Ike Yost, I wanted to meet the man. I knew he had been in Hays many years and thought he would give me some pointers on topography of the country.

Together, the two climbed the high bluff on a south bend of Big Creek and took in the scene. Riding back to Hays, Haworth pitched the idea of a cement plant at that bluff. He thought this could be the site of the most profitable cement mill in the state; only gravity would be needed to move the limestone from the top of the bluff to a mill in the valley. Yost saw that with no capital investment ample water was to be found in the creek and the transcontinental railroad passing through the site could bring in fuel and ship out cement as far as either coast without freight transfer. Yost also observed that they could leverage the largest industry in western Kansas by founding an adjoining town and selling the lots.

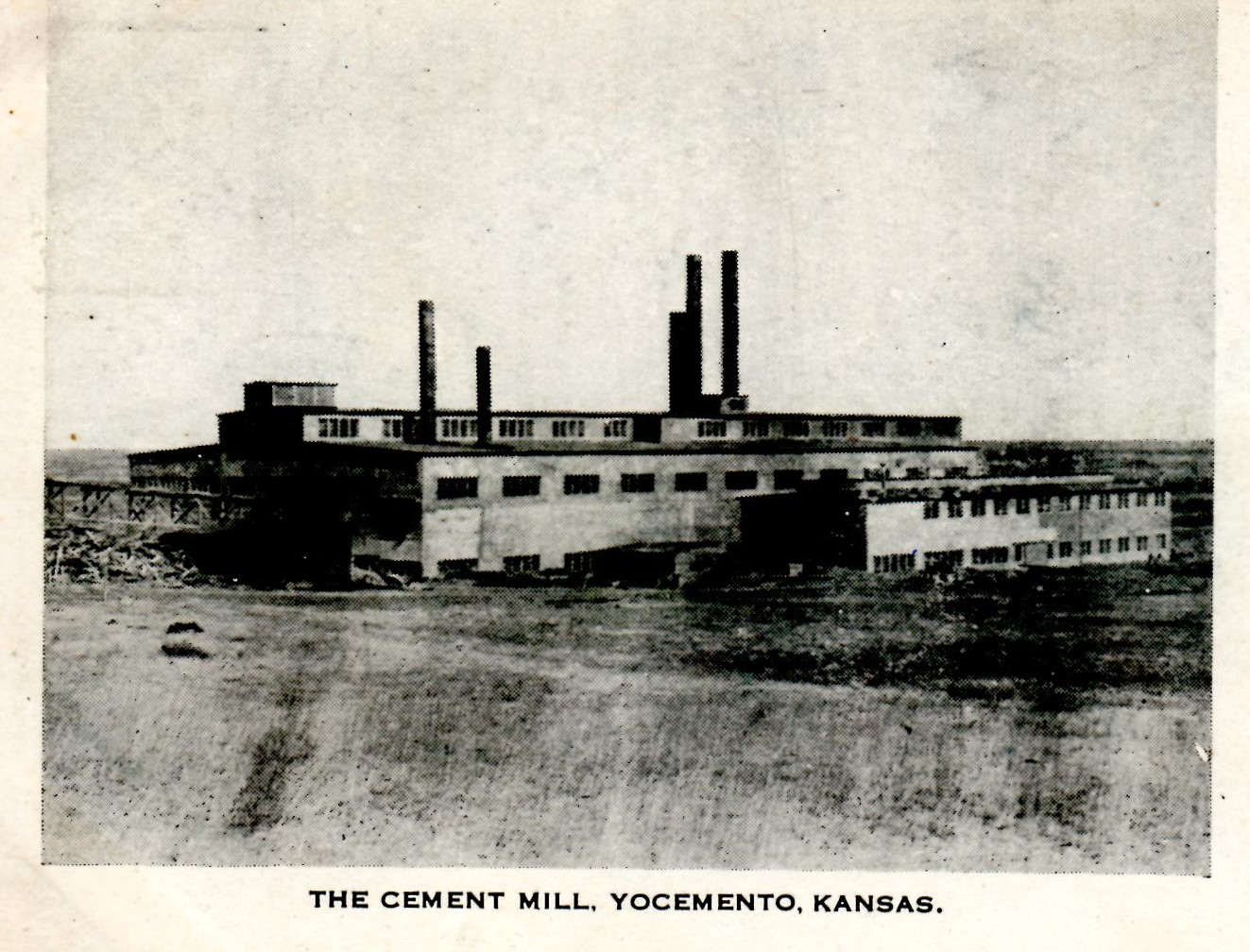

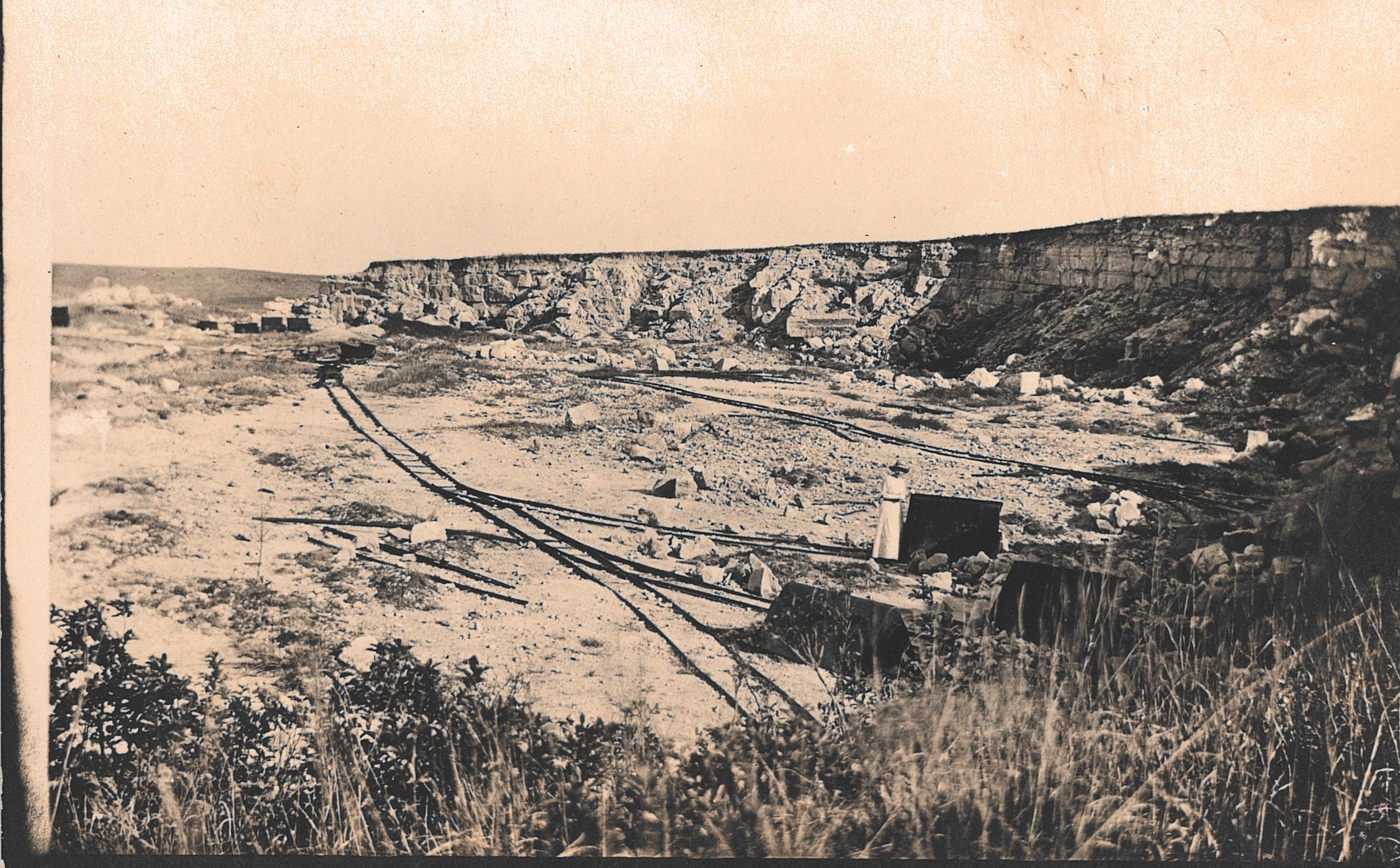
The mill's quarry in the Fort Hays Limestone Member, near time of abandonment

The partners soon founded the United States Portland Cement Company and began selling stock, Yost selling a third of the shares. The town of Yocemento (a portmanteau of Yost and cement) was platted in 1907. A post office opened that same year.

Construction of the mill began in 1907. Freeborn Engineering and Construction Co. of Kansas City, Mo. were the engineers and contractors for the plant. First, a gravity-worked cable lift and then a trolley were installed to lower limestone from the quarry to the mill. By mid-1908, the mill was operational, and the town included a general store, hotel, and restaurant. Many local residents employed at the mill were ethnic Hungarians who had constructed a Catholic church at the site.

The mill initially operated at a small profit and the product's test strength was as good as any of the best cements. Cement produced in Yocemento was used to build the Kansas City Union Station (then second-largest in the country) and to pave the Denver Tramway.

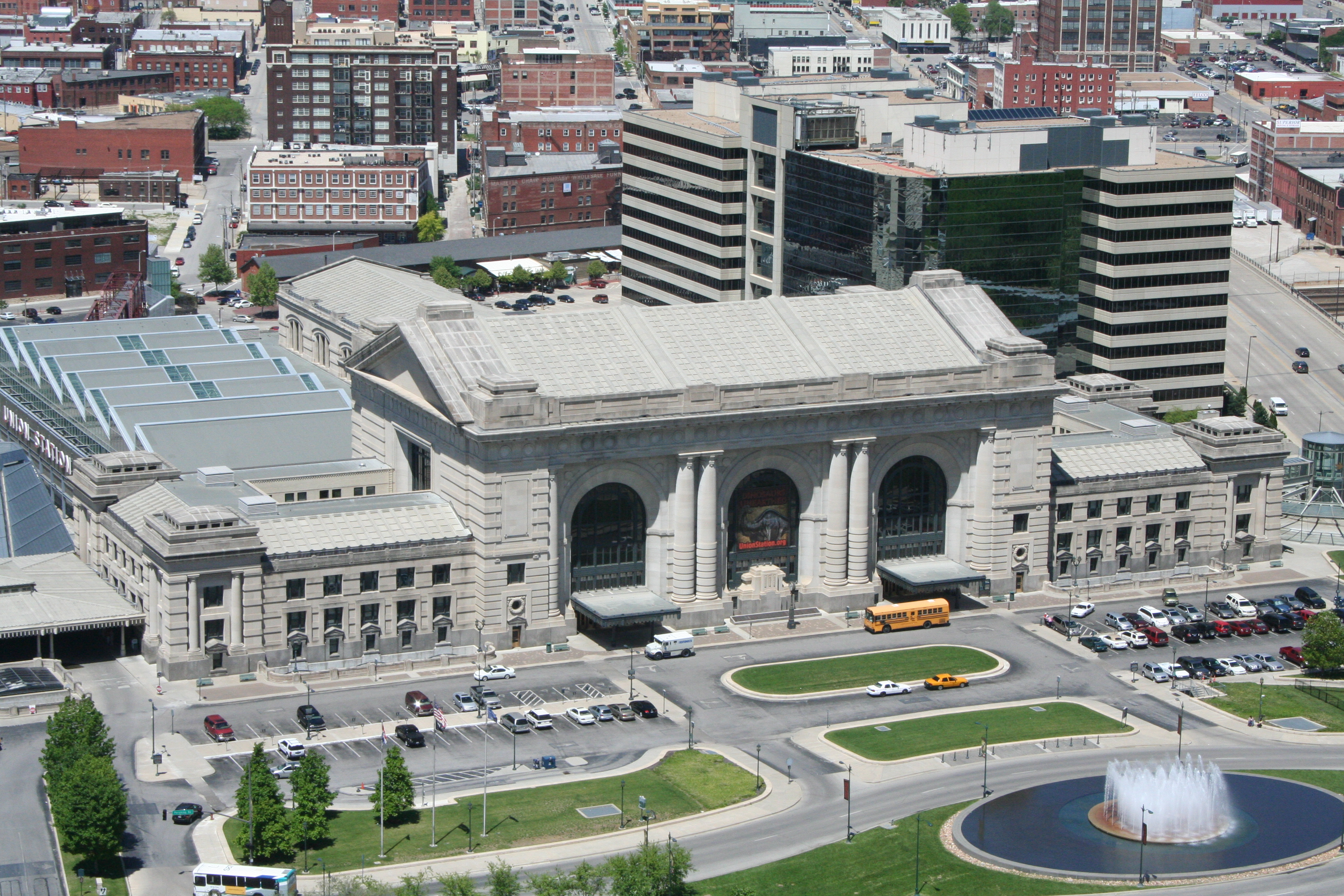
Kansas City Union Station was built with cement made in Yocemento.

Sale of cement to these projects was in competition with the established cement syndicates of Kansas City and Denver. It was locally perceived that these concerns then "ganged up" on the Yocemento mill to force it out of business. In particular, the Denver interests (Boettcher Company) pressured the Union Pacific to not service Yocemento with Colorado coal.

Denied affordable coal, the plains cement mills were able to make use of oil, newly produced in eastern Kansas and Oklahoma. A penny postcard photograph shows three large oil tanks at the Yocemento cement mill.

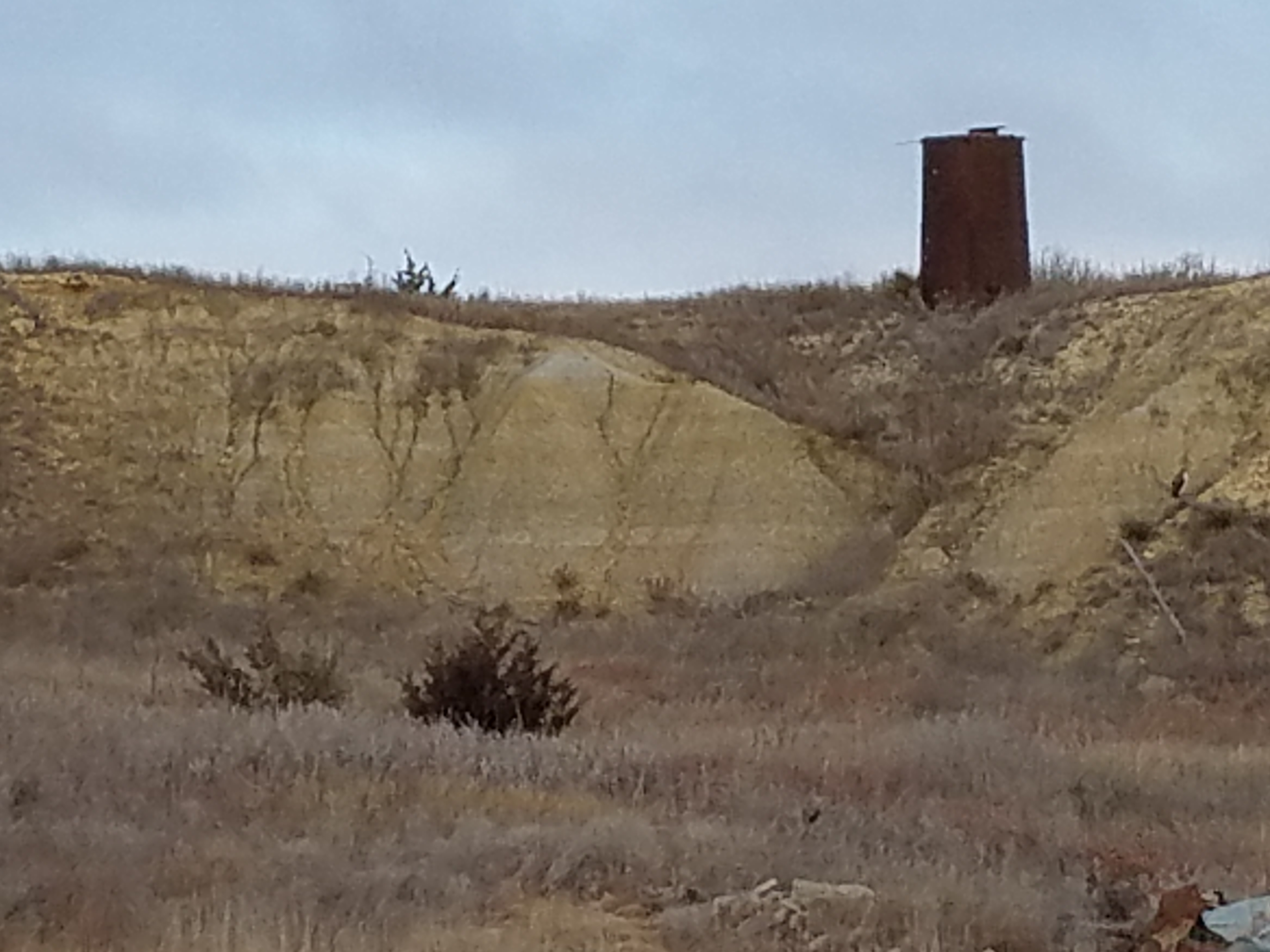
Blue Hill Shale quarry, below the limestone quarry, was used at the mill for the silica component of Portland cement.

Missouri cement plants undercut market prices and railroads applied surcharges to the plains cement mills. In 1911, U. S. Portland Cement Co. filed complaint with the ICC for relief from a perceived arbitrary rail freight surcharge of around 3 cents per hundredweight of cement compared to the lower cement shipping rates charged to manufactures in Missouri (between Kansas City and St. Louis). This complaint was joined by several other cement manufactures in the open plains of Nebraska, Kansas, Colorado, Oklahoma, South Dakota, Montana, Texas, and Utah. However, the ICC ruled no evidence of overt shipping overcharge except in the case of Oklahoma. The ICC stated that the cement businesses complaining of excessive shipping charges were in fact suffering from their over-production of cement and the diminishing supply of cheap natural gas used to make the cement.

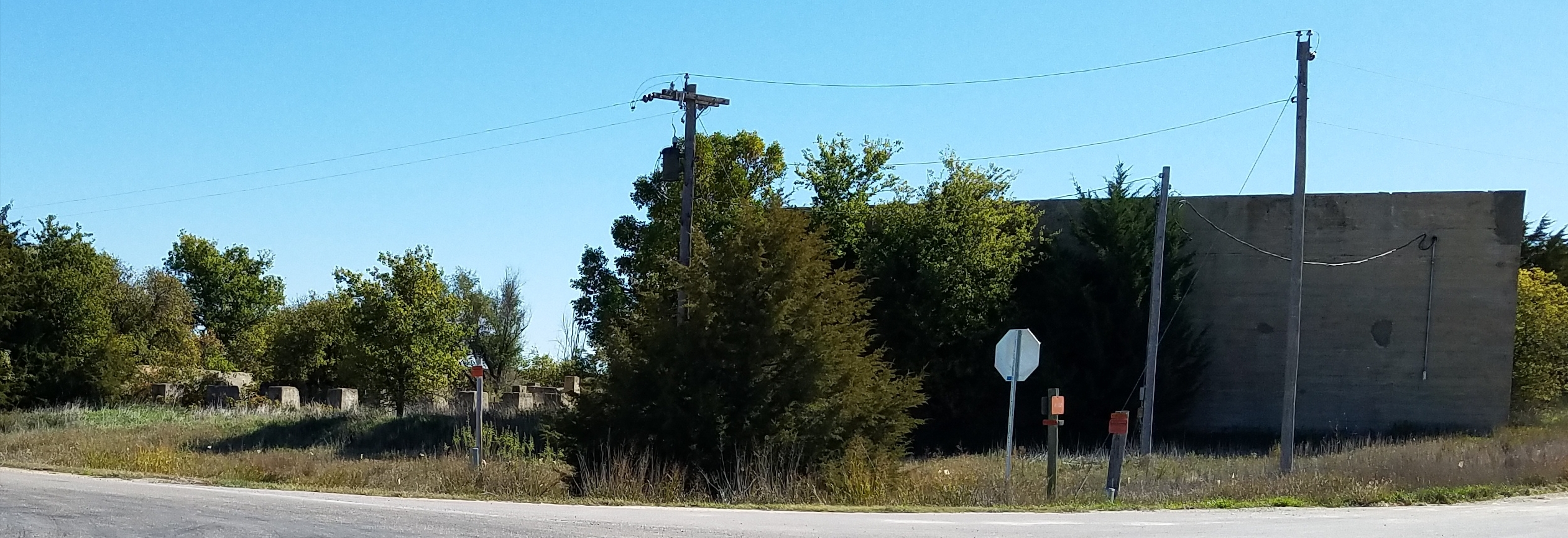
Remaining cement mill structures

The mill began losing money and Yost and Haworth had to relinquish control, the company going into bankruptcy a few years later. In March 1916, John Kernan Mullen bought the company for $165,000 in a sheriff's sale. The millionaire flour miller of Denver, who held the first mortgage of the Yocemento mill, bought the facility with the intent to "put the mill in shape and start running it again". In 1917, the Boettcher Company then bought the mill and promptly dismantled it, arguing the plant's remoteness from fuel sources and cement markets made the company nonviable.

With the mill closed, residents began to leave the community. The post office closed as well. In 1931, the church building was moved to Buckeye Township for use as a community hall.

I. M. Yost moved to Kansas City, then to Denver, and later to California, but remained interested in Hays, returning a few times. Erasmus Haworth did not return to Ellis County until 1923, then to survey the Yocemento area for oil.

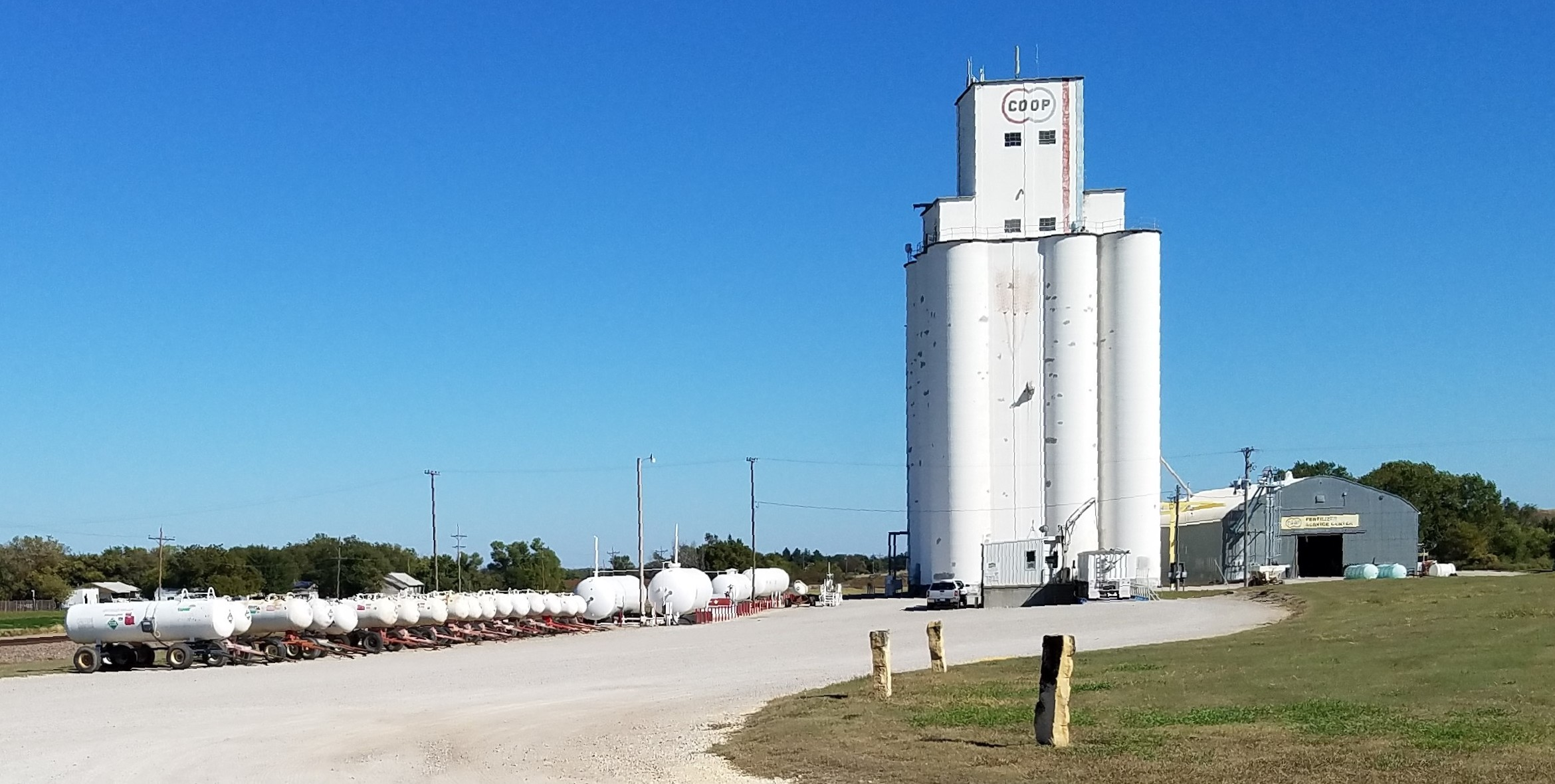
Midland Marketing Co-op elevator and bulk fertilizer chemical warehouse

Yocemento is the location of a grain elevator and bulk fertilizer and chemical warehouse operated by Midland Marketing farmer's cooperative. There are a number of homes, most built long after the closure of the mill. A few of the concrete walls and foundations of the mill remain, parts of which have been remodeled into family homes.

=== Hydrocarbon production ===
While developing the cement mill, Erasmus Haworth commented that oil would be discovered someday in the anticline he discovered in the area. In 1923, a few years after the mill had closed, Haworth returned to the area just a few miles northwest of Yocemento to drill for oil. His company drilled only one dry hole and then abandoned the effort because of a drop in oil prices. Fortunately for the county and state, later exploration by others proved Haworth correct; his one well had been drilled right between two of the largest producing oil pools in Kansas. At times over the following decades, Ellis County ranked as the top oil producing county in Kansas.

=== Railroad realignment ===
An abandoned railroad alignment is south of the present county highway, with the original highway alignment lying 300 yards (270 m) to the north in the old townsite. The original alignment of the railroad was cut across the slump blocks that had slid from the slope into the creek, which was undercutting the bluff. Slumping is characteristic on bluffs of the Fort Hays Escarpment, where the deep Carlile Shale weathers away but is unable to support high, steep slopes. As in the Benecke photograph of the treeless Hog Back, this slump formed a narrow terrain between the deep banks of Big Creek and the steep slope of the bluff. The blocks of the slump obstructed wagon traffic west from Fort Hays, which found routes over the Hog Back further south. The railroad, however, was able to cut a roadbed through the slumping. Unfortunately, the slump was not stable and the railroad repeatedly repaired the shifting roadbed over the decades. By the early 1900s, railroad surveyors considered tunneling through the Hogback. Eventually, the railroad drove many pilings into the bank (still visible from the highway), but failed to stabilize the roadbed. In 1951–52, Union Pacific straightened the alignment of the tracks to cut across the bow of Big Creek though the abandoned townsite, also cutting a new channel for the creek about 500 feet (150 m) to the north. The portion of original creek channel at the base of the bluff remains, water still occasionally ponding where Benecke's sportsmen fished in 1873.

=== Highway realignment ===
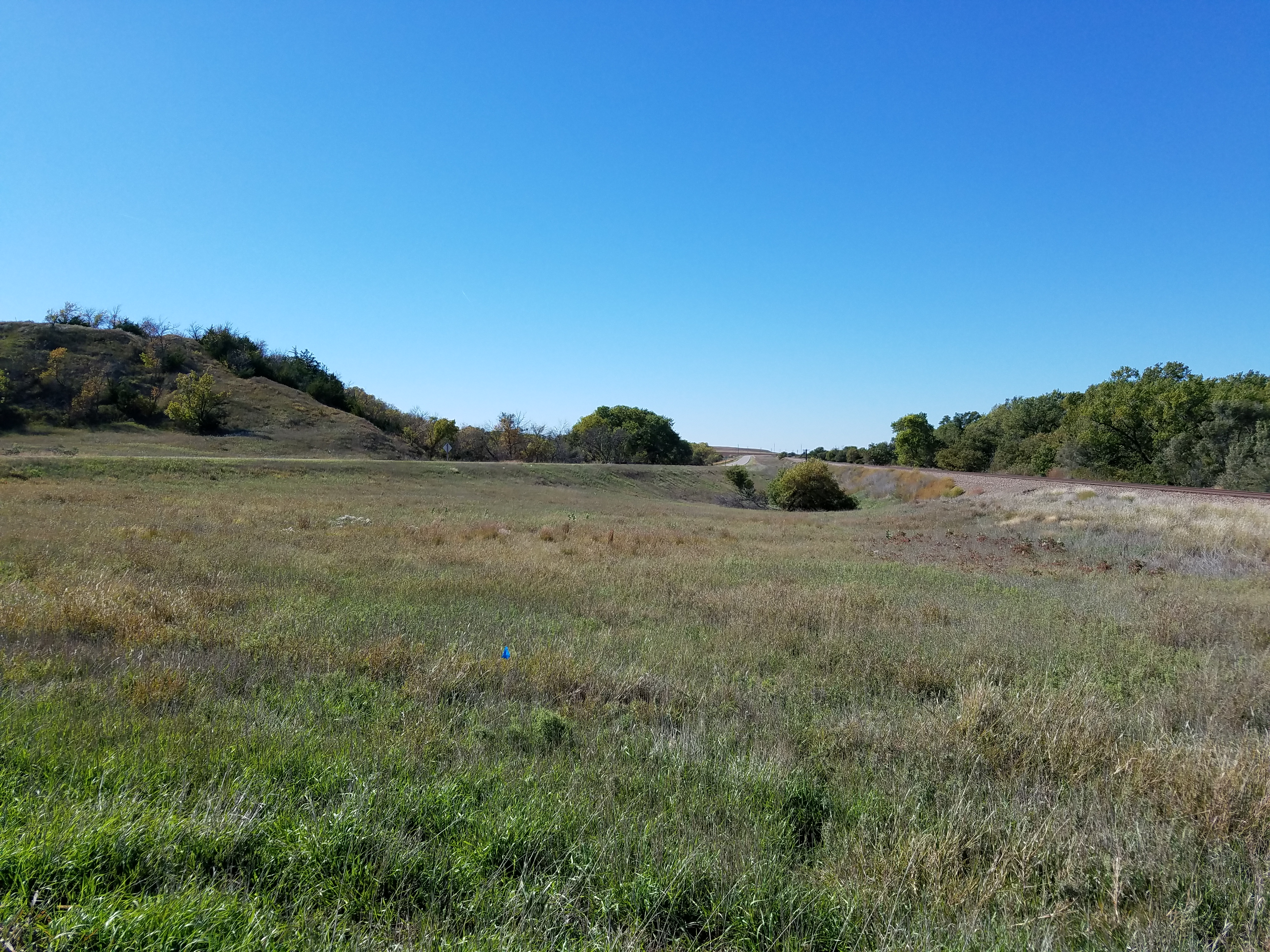
Parallel highway and railroad track west out of Yocemento; the original track was at the base of the bluff at left, original highway was behind the trees at right.

From the first settlement, wagon travel up the line west of Fort Hays meant either crossing and driving north of Big Creek or crossing over the top of the Hog Back to the south. The ground was too rough at the base of the bluff at Big Creek for wagon traffic; moreover, that passage was occupied by the railroad early on.

The first public road constructed from Hays to Yocemento, originally named "Yocemento Road", was built expressly to connect Hays economically with the expected cement boom at Yocemento. Extending from 12th Street at Hays, the road crossed Big Creek along the old Main Street of Rome and continued along the north of the track to Yocemento.

Over 1915–1916, the Ellis County government extended the Yocemento Road to Ellis to complete the county's segment of the Kansas City-Denver Golden Belt Road though the county. The extension started at the section line where the St. Agnes Church stood, running straight west along Third Street (see Yost's plan above) to cross the track; from that crossing, it ran along the south of the track through Ellis. Much of the Golden Belt Road became U.S. Route 40 in 1926, thus the earliest road from Hays "through the heart" of Yocemento was the only segment of the original "Highway 40" alignment between Wilson and Wallace to run along the north side of the Kansas Pacific tracks, making two grade crossings to do so. Due to the inconvenience and accidents at the west crossing, this matter was eventually corrected.

The problem the railroad was having with the tracks at Yocemento also created an opportunity to improve the Federal highway there. When the railroad moved the tracks well away from the landslide area (1951–52) the new Highway 40 section was also built south of the tracks from a new bridge across Big Creek at Hays to the old crossing just west of Yocemento. The old highway north of the track is now maintained by the county, and is named Rome Avenue, running from near the old crossing and passing through Yocemento, and a few miles further on passing the Rome Townsite as it enters Hays.

== Geography ==
Yocemento is 1 mile (1.6 km) south of Interstate 70 and 5.5 miles (8.9 km) west-northwest of Hays, the county seat.

Yocemento lies across the banks of Big Creek on the eastern edge of the Chalk Hills area of the Smoky Hills region of the Great Plains.

== Media ==
The town's newspaper, Yocemento Star, was edited by Frank Motz, then a young man, later founder of the Hays Daily News.

== Transportation ==
=== Rail ===
The Kansas Pacific (KP) line of the Union Pacific Railroad runs southeast-northwest through Yocemento, with a spur for the grain elevator and bulk supplies.

=== Highways ===
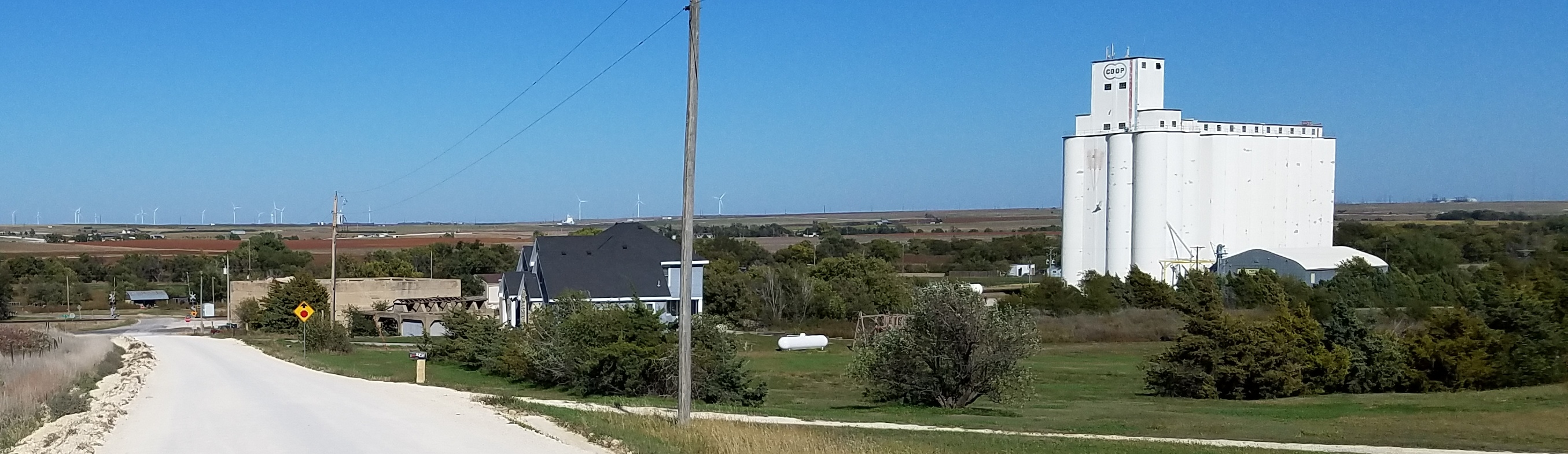
Yocemento Avenue approaches the old mill buildings from the south.

Old Hwy 40 (RS 1977) (parallel to and south of the railroad tracks, an old alignment of U.S. Route 40) runs southeast-northwest through Yocemento between the old cement plant and quarry to the south and the grain elevator and remainder of the village to the north. This highway is a direct connection between the downtowns of Hays and Ellis.

Yocemento Avenue runs generally north-south through the community, connecting to Exit 153 of Interstate 70 a mile to the north.

Rome Avenue runs east-west through the old townsite, then runs north of the track to Hays.

== See also ==
- Other communities with active and defunct Portland cement plants that used the Fort Hays Limestone:
  - Superior, Nebraska (Superior Nebraska Cement Company/Ideal Cement Company)
  - Yankton, South Dakota (Western Portland Cement Company)
  - Portland, Fremont County, Colorado (Ideal Cement Co./Holcim)
  - Laporte, Colorado (Ideal Cement Co/Holcim)
- Guide Rock (Pa-hur), a similar Fort Hays Escarpment bluff, landmark, and sacred site, altered by human action
