= Rome, Ellis County, Kansas =

Ghost town in Ellis County, Kansas

Rome, Kansas
- Ghost town
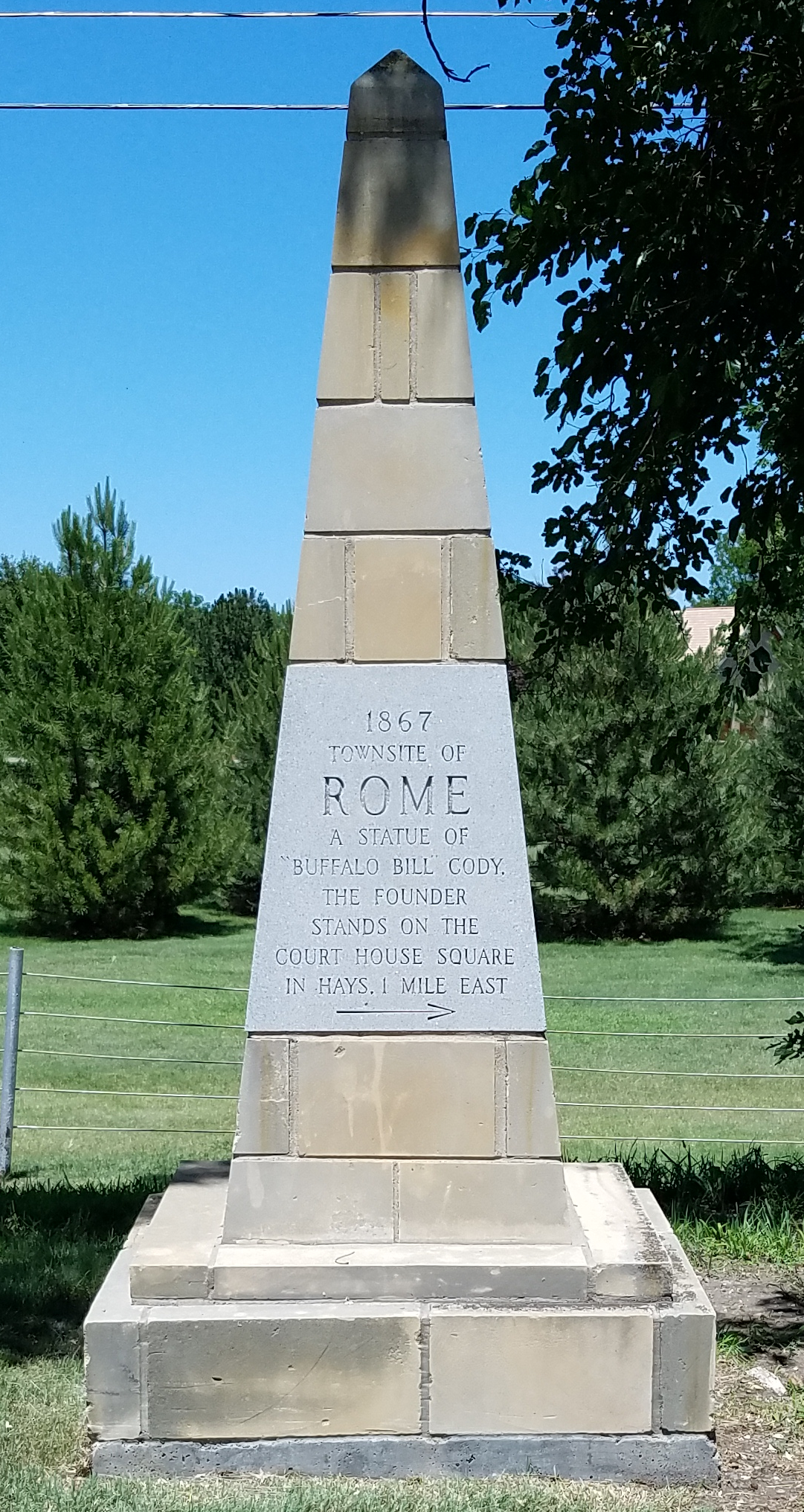
- Nickname: The Walled City
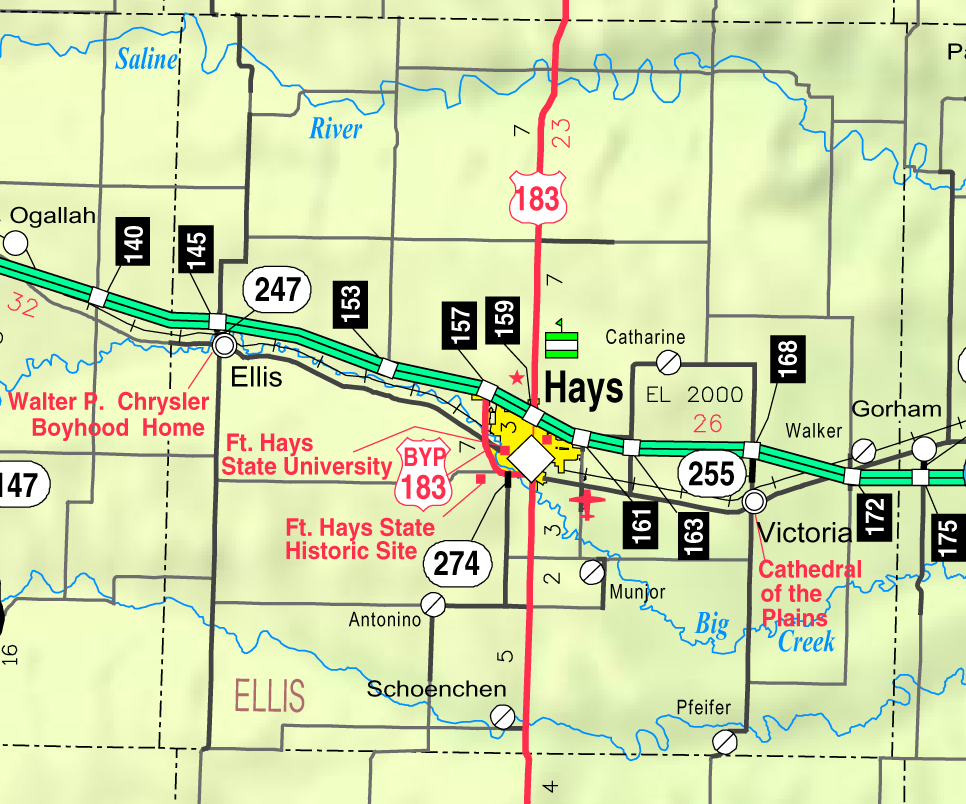
- KDOT map of Ellis County (legend)

- Location within Kansas Location within the United States
- Coordinates: 38°52′43.59″N 99°20′39.71″W
- Country: United States
- State: Kansas
- County: Ellis
- Elevation: 1,909 ft (582 m)

Population
  - Total: 0
- Time zone: UTC-6 (CST)
  - Summer (DST): UTC-5 (CDT)
- Area code: 785

Rome was a short-lived postbellum frontier settlement in Big Creek Township, Ellis County, Kansas, United States. It is notable for its association with the early plains career of its co-founder, William Frederick "Buffalo Bill" Cody. Rome was the first town established within the future Ellis County, followed very shortly by rival Hays City.

== History ==
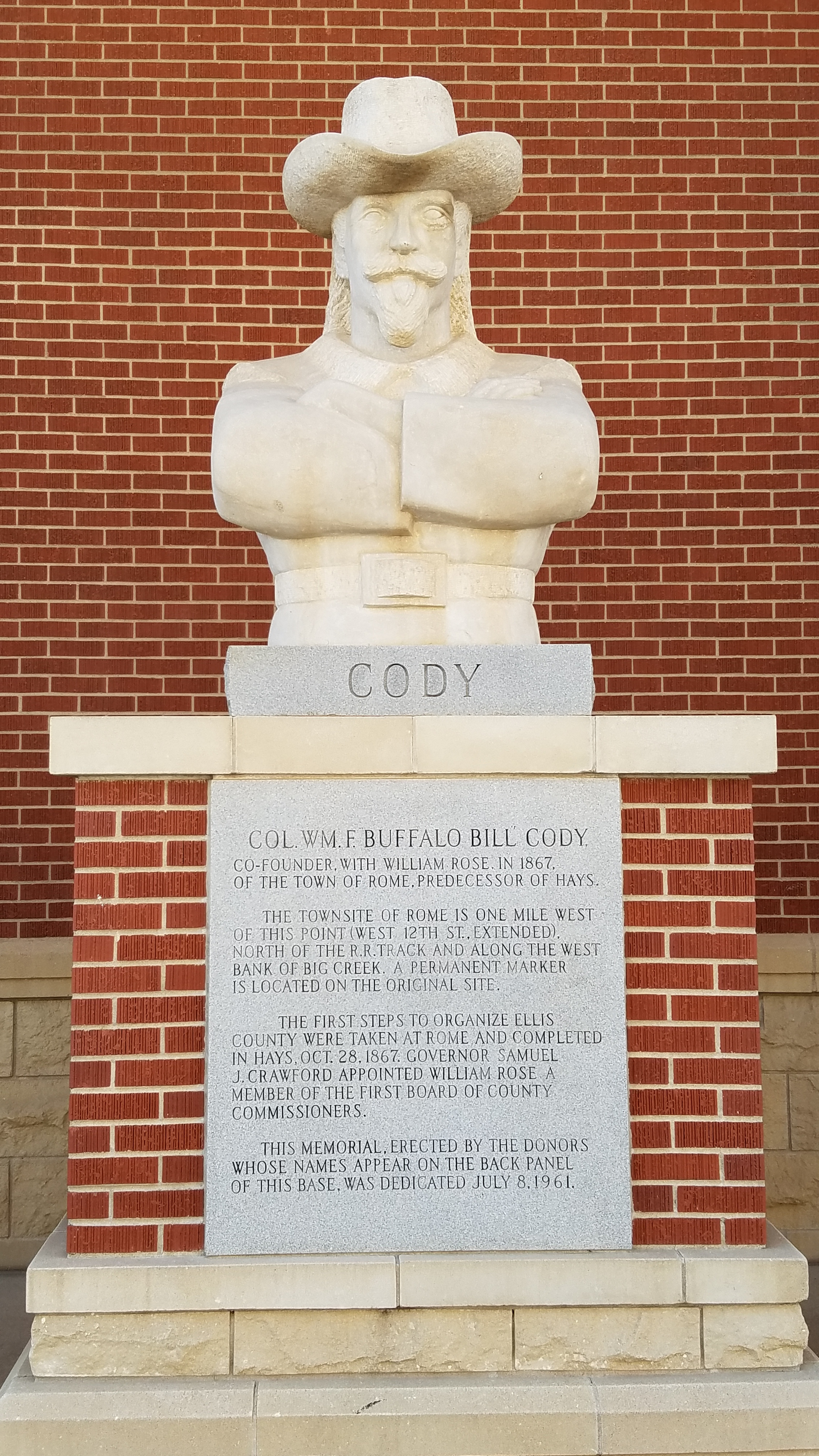
Monument to Rome and co-founder, Buffalo Bill, located on Main Street, Hays.

In 1867, William Rose, a railroad contractor, and William Cody founded the townsite to take advantage of the recent relocation of Fort Hays adjacent to the planned crossing of Big Creek by the Kansas Pacific Railway. It soon became a recreation center for 1200 railroad construction workers as well as their shelter in the Indian conflict that the railroad construction triggered. However, the railway's selection of Hays City for the station combined with the cholera outbreak in Rome the same summer resulted in the wholesale abandonment of the town in favor of Hays City.

In 1868, the Clarkson Brothers, Charlie, Matthew, and George, set their buffalo hunting headquarters at the abandoned Rome site. By 1872, they had completed the requirements for their homestead claim on the land Rome had occupied.

Although the town had quickly failed, Cody maintained an interest in the location. At the 1876 Centennial Exposition, Cody convinced I. M. Yost (the husband of a cousin) to build a water-powered grain mill at Rome. With assistance from soldiers from Fort Hays, Yost built a wooden dam there on Big Creek to power the mill and provide ice to the fort. While the dam was soon destroyed by animals and flooding and the mill by fire, Yost was committed to the locality and built more mills in and around Hays, and later founded nearby Yocemento.

A map of Rome was reconstructed in the 1930s as a WPA project. This map was compiled by H. R. Pollock from newspaper articles, interviews, and correspondence with people with historical connection with the town, including I. M. Yost, the miller, C. L. Henderson, who had a farm adjoining Rome, and Simon Motz, an early settler in Rome.

The historic townsite north of Rome Avenue is presently a private gated facility, managed by Rome Corporation.

=== Hangman's Bridge ===
In late 1867, the Kansas Pacific Railway completed a wooden through-truss bridge across Big Creek. Vigilantes active in early treeless Hays City used the bridge for hangings, and so it is known locally as Hangman's Bridge. Although the bridge was a full mile west from the early Hays City, it adjoined Rome; the Clarkson brothers noted seeing a body hanging on the bridge (probably Jack McGee who had stabbed a police constable, Frank Sheperd).

The bridge site is particularly associated with the 1869 lynching of three black soldiers of the 38th United States Colored Infantry Regiment.

== Transportation ==
The Kansas Pacific track defined the southern edge of the Rome townsite. Here, the railroad was constructed at a significantly elevated grade justified by the potential for flooding on Big Creek. However, town residents suspected that the excessively elevated tracks were built intentionally to interfere with commerce of the town. The combination of the high track with the deeply cut ravine of Big Creek surrounding the remaining boundaries of Rome resulted in the derisive nickname "The Walled City". Today, the track is operated by the Union Pacific Railroad.

In 1867, the Ellis Trail passed along the north side of the town, crossing Big Creek at the east and west ends. The Butterfield Overland Despatch briefly operated a station in Rome, before relocating to Hays City.

Originally constructed as "Yocemento Road", present day Rome Avenue passes through the townsite east and west, crossing Big Creek just east of the townsite. This road was named Noose Road in 1989 for 9-1-1 services, but was renamed to Rome Avenue in 2020.

While Rome Avenue was the original U.S. Route 40 alignment (locally "Highway 40"), the United States Highway system vacated this alignment in 1947 when the highway and railroad tracks were realigned at Yocemento, moving the highway just to the south of the tracks between Yocemento and Hays. This newer alignment lost the U.S. Route 40 designation when Interstate 70 was completed and the road is now named Old Hwy 40.

The short spur Rome Road makes a connection across the track between Rome Avenue and Old Hwy 40.
