= Toulon, Kansas =

Unincorporated community in Ellis County, Kansas

- Unincorporated community
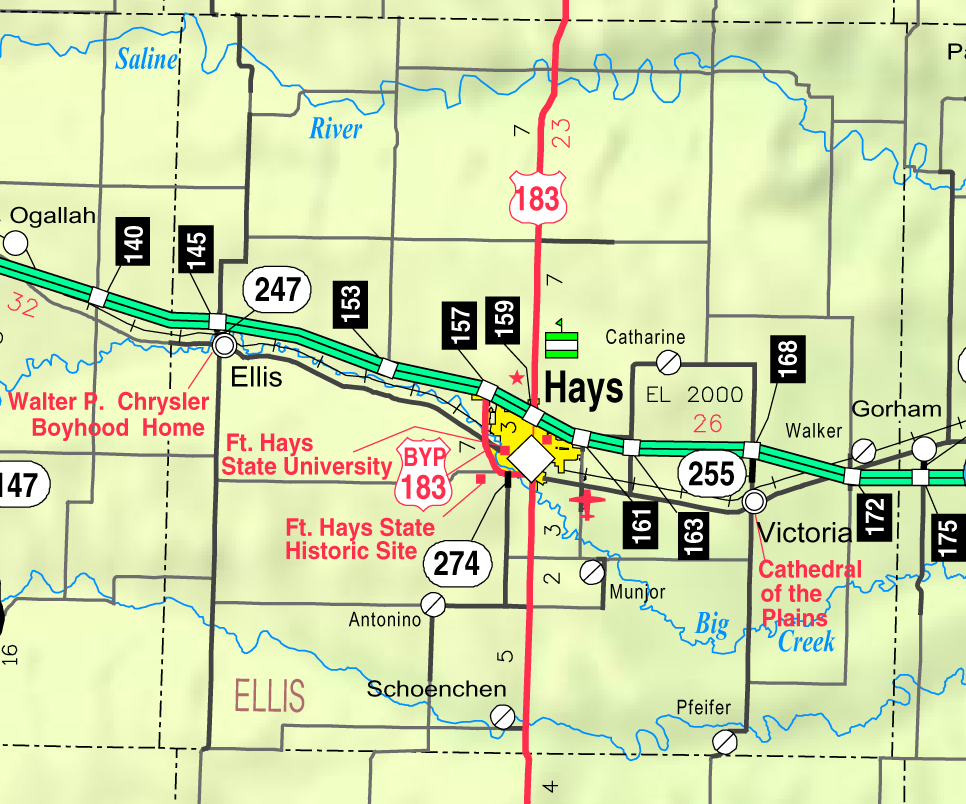
- KDOT map of Ellis County (legend)

- Location within Kansas Location within the United States
- Coordinates: 38°51′06″N 99°14′29″W
- Country: United States
- State: Kansas
- County: Ellis
- Township: Big Creek
- Named for: Toulon, France
- Elevation: 2,001 ft (610 m)
- Time zone: UTC-6 (CST)
  - Summer (DST): UTC-5 (CDT)
- ZIP Code: 67601
- Area code: 785
- FIPS code: 20-71100
- GNIS ID: 484728

Toulon is an unincorporated community in Big Creek Township, Ellis County, Kansas, United States. It is located east of Hays along old Hiway 40.

== History ==
Toulon was likely named, directly or indirectly, for the city of Toulon, in France.

A post office in Toulon opened in 1889, closed temporarily in 1891, reopened in 1898, and closed permanently in 1901.

== Geography ==
Toulon is 1.8 miles (2.9 km) south of Interstate 70 and 2 miles (3.2 km) east of Hays city limits.

Toulon lies 4 miles (6.4 km) north of Big Creek in the Smoky Hills region of the Great Plains.

== Transportation ==
The old alignment of U.S. Route 40, now a paved county road, runs southeast–northwest through Toulon. Another paved county road, Toulon Avenue, runs north–south through the community, connecting to an interchange with Interstate 70 to the north.

The Kansas Pacific (KP) line of the Union Pacific Railroad runs southeast–northwest through Toulon, parallel to the old alignment of U.S. 40.
