= Big Creek Township, Kansas =

Big Creek Township, Kansas may refer to:

- Big Creek Township, Ellis County, Kansas
- Big Creek Township, Neosho County, Kansas
- Big Creek Township, Russell County, Kansas

== See also ==
- List of Kansas townships
- Big Creek Township (disambiguation)
