= Big Creek Township, Arkansas =

Big Creek Township, Arkansas may refer to:

- Big Creek Township, Craighead County, Arkansas
- Big Creek Township, Fulton County, Arkansas
- Big Creek Township, Hot Spring County, Arkansas
- Big Creek Township, Lee County, Arkansas
- Big Creek Township, Newton County, Arkansas
- Big Creek Township, Phillips County, Arkansas
- Big Creek Township, Sebastian County, Arkansas
- Big Creek Township, Sharp County, Arkansas
- Big Creek Township, White County, Arkansas

== See also ==
- List of townships in Arkansas
- Big Creek Township (disambiguation)
