= I. M. Yost =

American miller and frontier industrialist

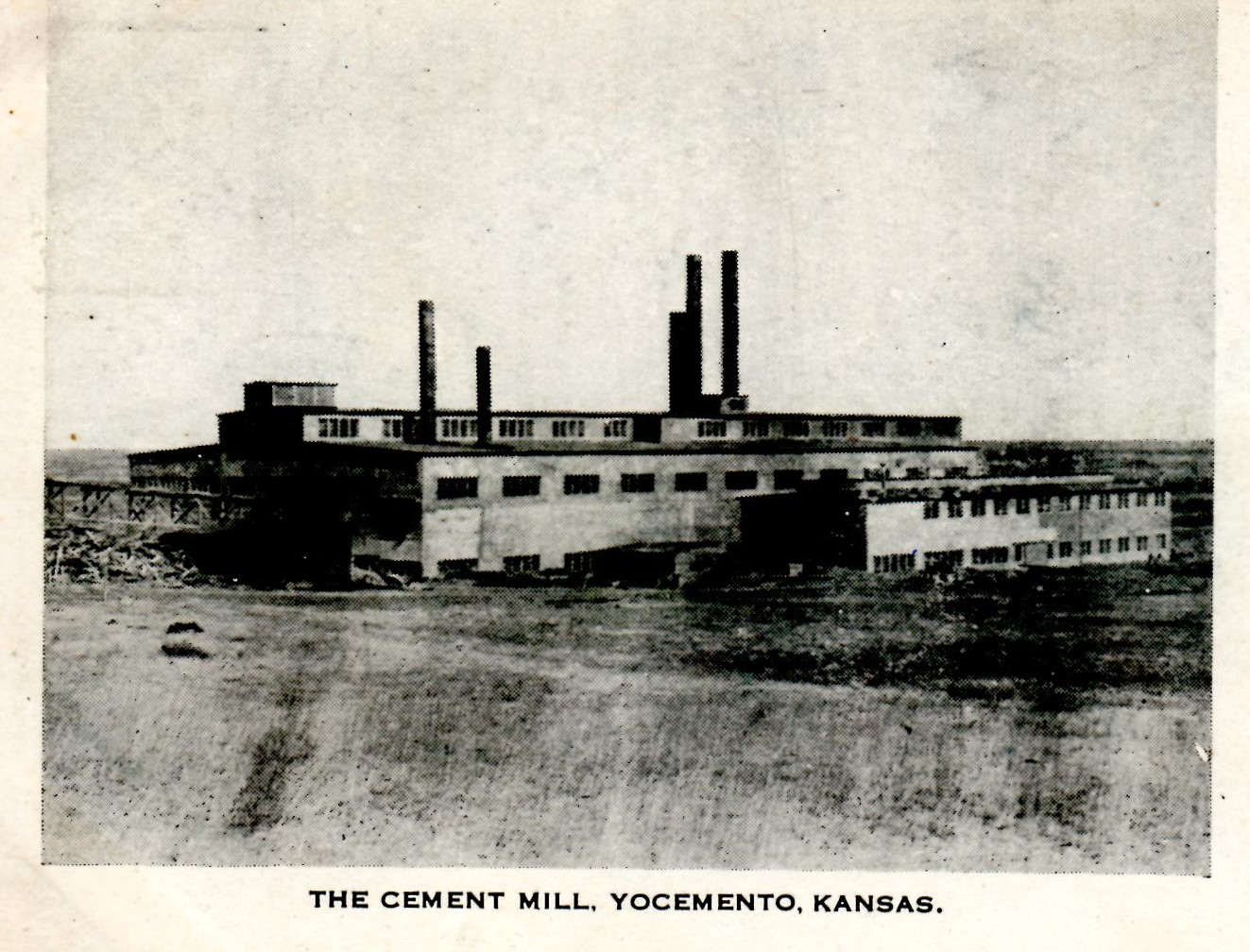
- The Yocemento Cement Mill; Co-founded by I. M. Yost, "the man who built Hays".
- Born: 1848; Norristown, Montgomery County, Pennsylvania
- Died: 1944 (aged 95–96); California
- Other name: Ike
- Occupation: miller
- Spouse: Sallie T. Johnson (m. 1871)
- Children: Lin, Ed, Eda

I. M. Yost, Isaac M. Yost, or Ike, was a miller and frontier industrialist who led the development of flour milling in the settlement of Hays City, Kansas. Even though he was the leading miller in Hays for decades, he was particularly remembered there for co-founding the short-lived United States Portland Cement Company and the associated townsite of Yocemento.

Yost was born in Norristown, Pennsylvania in 1848. In 1871, Yost married Sallie T. Johnson. Sally was a cousin of William Cody (Buffalo Bill), who, just before his buffalo hunting fame, had co-founded a short-lived town, Rome, Kansas, a rival of Hays City. At the Centennial Exposition of 1876, Cody persuaded Yost to move to the then vacated Rome townsite and build a dam and flour mill there. Although the dam was soon destroyed and the mill burned, Yost persevered, rebuilding in neighboring Hays City, and rebuilding again each time after 2 more fires. By 1910, he operated several mills in the railroad towns ranging of a distance of about 94 miles from Wilson to Hays to Collyer.

Erasmus Haworth, the first director of the Kansas Geological Survey, came to Ellis County in 1906, seeking to continue his study of western Kansas geology. For a local guide, he sought out the respected "Ike" Yost. Yost drove Haworth out to the Ellis County Hog Back, the local name for the limestone bluffs a few miles west of Fort Hays. Pooling their knowledge of geology and industry, the two partnered to found the successful but short-lived United States Portland Cement Company and the supporting town, Yocemento, at the base of the bluff. The company made a rapid start, but struggled and failed under intense competition with established cement manufactures in Denver and Missouri.

With the company sold to the Denver competitor in 1916, Yost moved to Kansas City, then to Denver. However, he remained a booster of the community. He consulted in the WPA mapping project of Rome.

In later years, Yost made his home with a son, Ed, in California, dying at the age of 96.
