= Martha L. Addis =

American jeweler (1878–1942)

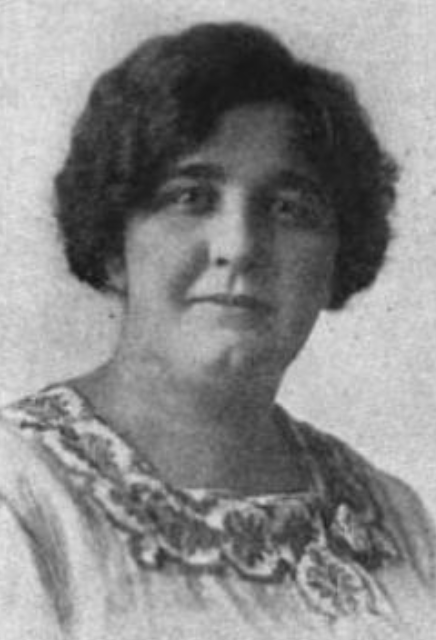
- Martha L. Addis, from a 1920 publication
- Born: Martha Lillian Addis; February 24, 1878; Ellis, Kansas
- Died: August 18, 1942 (aged 64); Topeka, Kansas
- Occupations: Jeweler, businesswoman, clubwoman

Martha Lillian Addis (February 24, 1878 – August 18, 1942) was an American jeweler, businesswoman, and clubwoman, based in Topeka, Kansas.

== Early life ==
Martha Lillian Addis was born in Ellis, Kansas, the daughter of Edward S. Addis and Alice L. Reynolds Addis (later Jeffrey). Her father was from Ohio and was a wounded veteran of the American Civil War. Her mother was born in Wisconsin. "Miss Addis was self-educated and has achieved unusual success despite the greatest handicaps," noted a 1925 newspaper report, without elaborating on the nature of the obstacles she faced.

== Career ==
In 1906, M. L. Addis opened the Addis Jewelry and Gift Store in Topeka, and was described as "one of the few women jewelers in the United States" in 1920. She was vice-president of the Kansas Retail Jewelers Association, and active in the American National Retail Jewelers Association (ANRJA). In 1922, she addressed the Nebraska Retail Jewelers' convention, the only woman on the program. In addition to designing, selling, and repairing jewelry, she had a noted business in phonograph machines, painted china, cut glass, clocks, watches, and silverware.

As a well-known woman jeweler, she was the target of crimes: in 1915, her purse was snatched, but she chased the thief and cornered him under a porch. In 1921, she suffered a loss when $2000 worth of rings were stolen in a store robbery. Two men were suspected of robbing $600 worth of jewelry from Addis in 1927.

Addis offered her store as a meeting place for various community groups. She was president of the Business and Professional Women's Club of Topeka. She was president of the Shawnee County Old Settlers' Association.

== Personal life ==
Addis's home burned down in 1923. In 1935, she was injured in a car accident. She died in 1942, aged 64 years, in Topeka.
