= Big Creek Township =

Big Creek Township may refer to:

== Arkansas ==
- Big Creek Township, Craighead County, Arkansas, in Craighead County, Arkansas
- Big Creek Township, Fulton County, Arkansas, in Fulton County, Arkansas
- Big Creek Township, Hot Spring County, Arkansas, in Hot Spring County, Arkansas
- Big Creek Township, Lee County, Arkansas, in Lee County, Arkansas
- Big Creek Township, Newton County, Arkansas, in Newton County, Arkansas
- Big Creek Township, Phillips County, Arkansas, in Phillips County, Arkansas
- Big Creek Township, Sebastian County, Arkansas, in Sebastian County, Arkansas
- Big Creek Township, Sharp County, Arkansas, in Sharp County, Arkansas
- Big Creek Township, White County, Arkansas, in White County, Arkansas

== Indiana ==
- Big Creek Township, White County, Indiana

== Iowa ==
- Big Creek Township, Black Hawk County, Iowa

== Kansas ==
- Big Creek Township, Ellis County, Kansas
- Big Creek Township, Neosho County, Kansas, in Neosho County, Kansas
- Big Creek Township, Russell County, Kansas

== Michigan ==
- Big Creek Township, Michigan

== Missouri ==
- Big Creek Township, Cass County, Missouri
- Big Creek Township, Henry County, Missouri
- Big Creek Township, Ozark County, Missouri
- Big Creek Township, Taney County, Missouri, in Taney County, Missouri
- Big Creek Township, Madison County, Missouri

== North Carolina ==
- Big Creek Township, Stokes County, North Carolina
