= Big Creek Township, Ozark County, Missouri =

Township in Ozark County, Missouri, U.S.

Coordinates: 36.5578°N 92.7075°W

Big Creek Township is an inactive township in Ozark County, in the U.S. state of Missouri.

Big Creek Township was erected in 1841, taking its name from the Big North Fork Creek.
