= Big Creek (Beech River tributary) =

Stream in Tennessee, U.S.

Coordinates: 35.618125°N 88.181982°W

Big Creek is a stream in the U.S. state of Tennessee. It is a tributary to the Beech River.

Big Creek was so named for its relatively large size.
