= Big Creek Township, Cass County, Missouri =

Township in Cass County, Missouri, U.S.

Coordinates: 38.7861°N 94.3511°W

Big Creek Township is an inactive township in Cass County, in the U.S. state of Missouri.

Big Creek Township was established in 1872, taking its name from Big Creek.
