= Big Creek (Wisconsin) =

Stream in Sauk County, Wisconsin, U.S.

Coordinates: 43°35′01″N 90°05′25″W

Big Creek is a stream in Sauk County, Wisconsin, in the United States.

Big Creek was named from its relatively large size.

== See also ==
- List of rivers of Wisconsin
