= Big Creek, British Columbia =

Big Creek
- Location of Big Creek in British Columbia
- Coordinates: 51°43′00″N 123°02′00″W
- Country: Canada
- Province: British Columbia
- Area codes: 250, 778

Big Creek is an unincorporated locality and former post office in the Chilcotin District of British Columbia, Canada, located south of Hanceville on the creek of the same name. The post office first opened in 1907 and was closed in 1975.

== Climate ==
Climate data for Big Creek
Month	Jan	Feb	Mar	Apr	May	Jun	Jul	Aug	Sep	Oct	Nov	Dec	Year
Record high °C (°F)	18.5 (65.3)	14.4 (57.9)	20 (68)	30.6 (87.1)	32.2 (90.0)	34.4 (93.9)	37.2 (99.0)	38.9 (102.0)	35 (95)	26.7 (80.1)	19 (66)	15.5 (59.9)	38.9 (102.0)
Mean daily maximum °C (°F)	−3.5 (25.7)	2.2 (36.0)	5.1 (41.2)	9.3 (48.7)	14.5 (58.1)	18.6 (65.5)	21.1 (70.0)	21.3 (70.3)	16.2 (61.2)	10.3 (50.5)	1.9 (35.4)	−3.3 (26.1)	9.5 (49.1)
Daily mean °C (°F)	−10.4 (13.3)	−5.3 (22.5)	−1.9 (28.6)	2.4 (36.3)	7 (45)	10.9 (51.6)	13.3 (55.9)	13.2 (55.8)	8.5 (47.3)	3.2 (37.8)	−4.3 (24.3)	−10 (14)	2.2 (36.0)
Mean daily minimum °C (°F)	−17.5 (0.5)	−13 (9)	−9.1 (15.6)	−4.7 (23.5)	−0.5 (31.1)	3.1 (37.6)	5.5 (41.9)	5.1 (41.2)	0.8 (33.4)	−3.9 (25.0)	−10.6 (12.9)	−17 (1)	−5.1 (22.8)
Record low °C (°F)	−47.2 (−53.0)	−45 (−49)	−35.6 (−32.1)	−26.3 (−15.3)	−11 (12)	−7.2 (19.0)	−2.2 (28.0)	−4.5 (23.9)	−15.6 (3.9)	−31.5 (−24.7)	−36.5 (−33.7)	−46.7 (−52.1)	−47.2 (−53.0)
Average precipitation mm (inches)	29.1 (1.15)	17.3 (0.68)	12.5 (0.49)	17.5 (0.69)	31.7 (1.25)	41.6 (1.64)	44.1 (1.74)	37.9 (1.49)	28.6 (1.13)	20 (0.8)	22.6 (0.89)	31.1 (1.22)	334.1 (13.15)
Source: 1961-1990 Environment Canada
