= Big Creek (Salt River tributary) =

Stream in the U.S. state of Missouri

Coordinates: 39°36′41″N 91°28′50″W

Big Creek is a stream in northern Ralls County in the U.S. state of Missouri. It is a tributary of the Salt River.

The stream headwaters arise just west of the community of Rensselaer (at ) and flows east to southeast to its confluence with the Salt about four miles west-northwest of New London (at ) at an elevation of 499 feet (152 m).

Big Creek was so named on account of its size.

== See also ==
- List of rivers of Missouri
