= Ellis, Kansas =

City in Ellis County, Kansas

- City
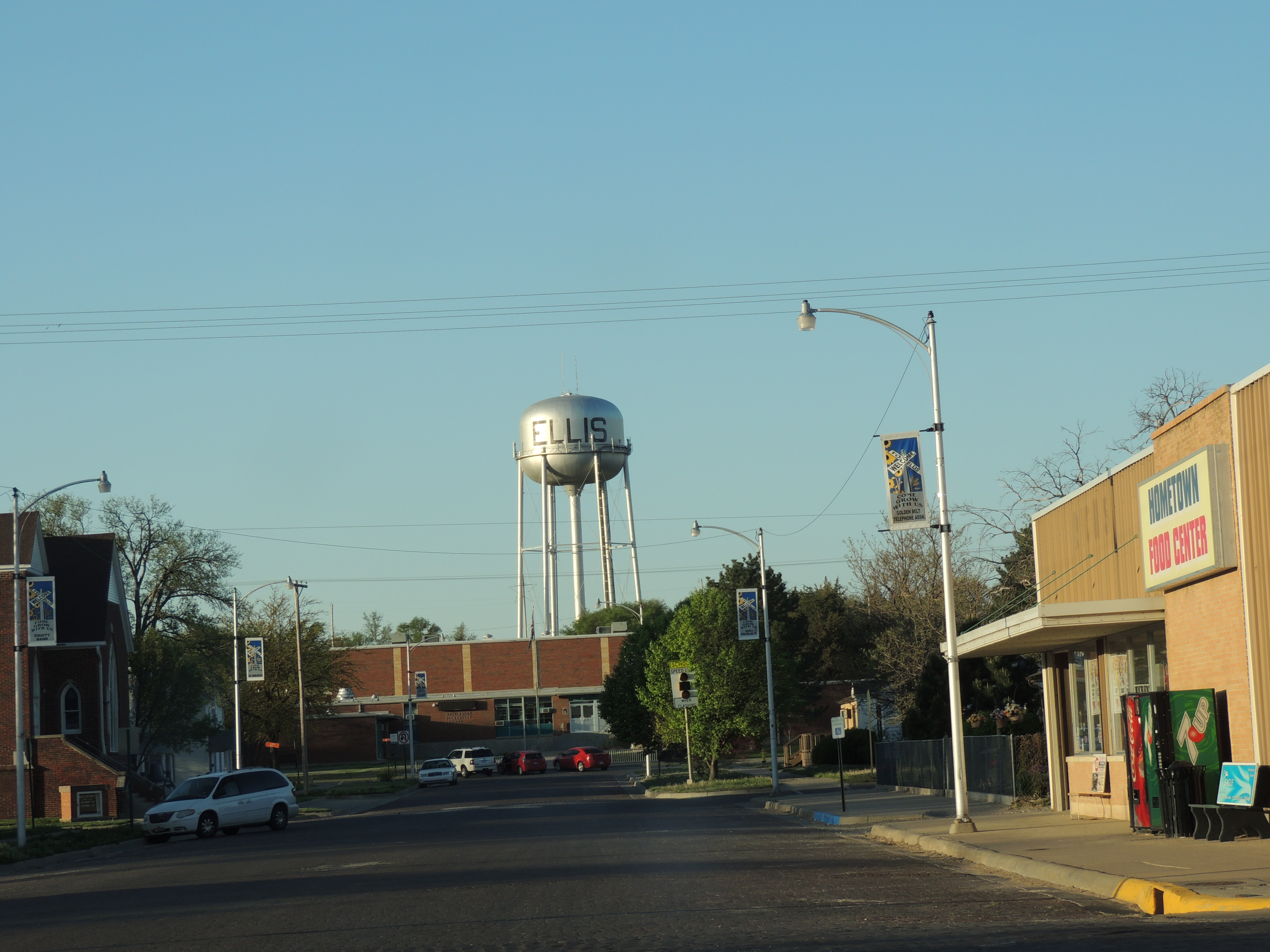
- Downtown Ellis (2014)

- Location within Ellis County and Kansas

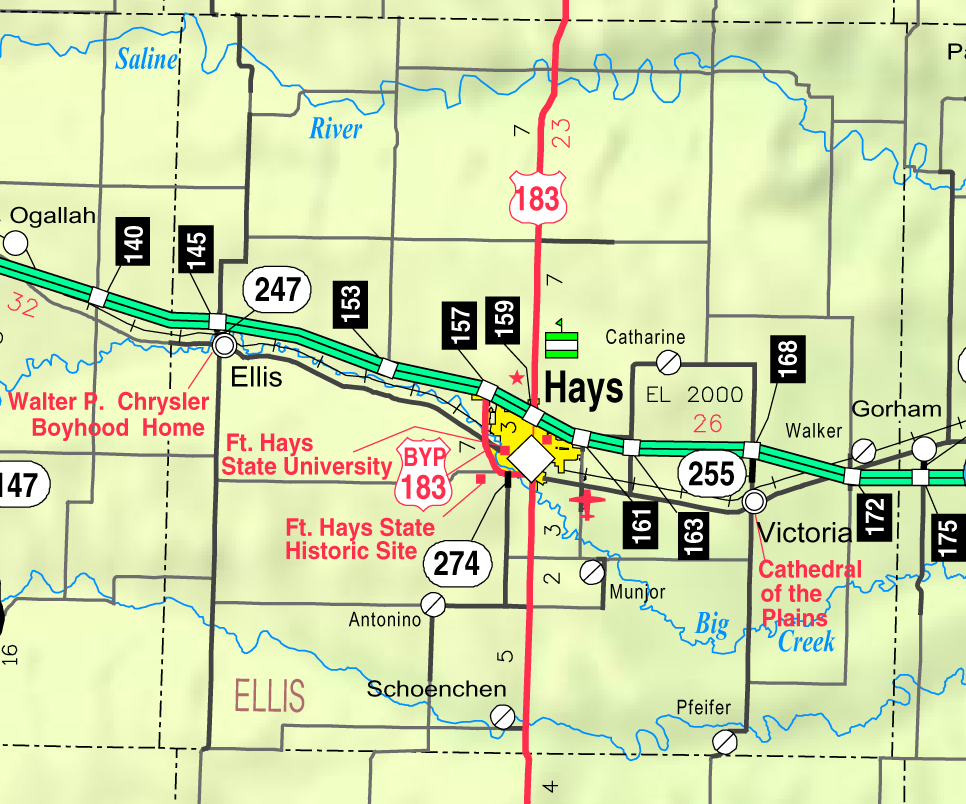
- KDOT map of Ellis County (legend)
- Coordinates: 38°56′05″N 99°33′24″W
- Country: United States
- State: Kansas
- County: Ellis
- Founded: 1870
- Incorporated: 1888

Area
  - Total: 1.66 sq mi (4.29 km^{2})
  - Land: 1.66 sq mi (4.29 km^{2})
  - Water: 0 sq mi (0.00 km^{2})
- Elevation: 2,133 ft (650 m)

Population (2020)
  - Total: 1,958
  - Density: 1,180/sq mi (456/km^{2})
- Time zone: UTC-6 (CST)
  - Summer (DST): UTC-5 (CDT)
- ZIP Code: 67637
- Area code: 785
- FIPS code: 20-20450
- GNIS ID: 485569
- Website: ellis.ks.us

Ellis is a city in Ellis County, Kansas, United States. As of the 2020 census, the population of the city was 1,958.

== History ==
The Kansas Pacific Railway built a water station at the site of present-day Ellis in 1867 and then purchased the site under the Homestead Act. Three years later, in 1870, the U.S. Post Office Department opened a post office at Ellis, marking the town's foundation. Kansas Pacific laid out the town in 1873, establishing a depot, a hotel, and a few shops. That same year, settlers from Syracuse, New York, and later from Louisville, Kentucky, arrived to work for the railroad. The first church opened in Ellis in 1873, the first school in 1874. Starting in 1875 and for the rest of the 1870s, Ellis was a cowtown, serving as a shipping point for cattle herds from the south. Bukovina Germans began settling in the area in 1886. Ellis incorporated as a city in January 1888.

Long ago, Ellis (as well as Hays) was once a sundown town, where African Americans were not welcome after dark.

== Geography ==
Ellis is located at 38°56′10″N 99°33′33″W (38.936211, -99.559269), at an elevation of 2,120 feet (646 m). Located in northwestern Kansas on Interstate 70, Ellis is 13 miles (21 km) west-northwest of Hays, the county seat. It is approximately 146 miles (235 km) northwest of Wichita and 260 miles (420 km) west of Kansas City.

Ellis lies on the western edge of the Smoky Hills region of the Great Plains. Big Creek, a tributary of the Smoky Hill River, runs east through the city and has been dammed to form a long, narrow reservoir, Big Creek Lake.

According to the United States Census Bureau, the city has a total area of 1.64 square miles (4.25 km^{2}), all land.

=== Climate ===
On average in Ellis, January is the coolest month, and July is both the warmest month and the wettest month. The hottest temperature recorded in Ellis was 110 °F (43 °C) in 2003; the coldest temperature recorded was -24 °F (-31 °C) in 1989.

Climate data for Ellis, Kansas
Month	Jan	Feb	Mar	Apr	May	Jun	Jul	Aug	Sep	Oct	Nov	Dec	Year
Record high °F (°C)	79 (26)	84 (29)	95 (35)	103 (39)	105 (41)	109 (43)	110 (43)	110 (43)	110 (43)	102 (39)	87 (31)	79 (26)	110 (43)
Mean daily maximum °F (°C)	42 (6)	48 (9)	57 (14)	67 (19)	76 (24)	87 (31)	93 (34)	91 (33)	83 (28)	72 (22)	55 (13)	45 (7)	68 (20)
Mean daily minimum °F (°C)	14 (−10)	19 (−7)	27 (−3)	37 (3)	48 (9)	59 (15)	64 (18)	62 (17)	53 (12)	40 (4)	26 (−3)	18 (−8)	39 (4)
Record low °F (°C)	−17 (−27)	−20 (−29)	−16 (−27)	12 (−11)	26 (−3)	39 (4)	45 (7)	41 (5)	26 (−3)	12 (−11)	−7 (−22)	−24 (−31)	−24 (−31)
Average precipitation inches (mm)	0.50 (13)	0.60 (15)	1.88 (48)	2.03 (52)	3.15 (80)	3.00 (76)	3.42 (87)	2.97 (75)	1.69 (43)	1.25 (32)	1.16 (29)	0.59 (15)	22.24 (565)
Source: The Weather Channel

== Demographics ==
Historical population
Census	Pop.	Note	%±
1870	120		—
1880	689		474.2%
1890	1,107		60.7%
1900	932		−15.8%
1910	1,404		50.6%
1920	1,876		33.6%
1930	1,957		4.3%
1940	2,042		4.3%
1950	2,649		29.7%
1960	2,218		−16.3%
1970	2,137		−3.7%
1980	2,062		−3.5%
1990	1,814		−12.0%
2000	1,873		3.3%
2010	2,062		10.1%
2020	1,958		−5.0%
U.S. Decennial Census

=== 2020 census ===
As of the 2020 census, Ellis had a population of 1,958, with 845 households and 521 families. The population density was 1,181.7 per square mile (456.2/km^{2}). There were 935 housing units at an average density of 564.3 per square mile (217.9/km^{2}).

The age distribution was 24.7% under the age of 18, 7.0% from 18 to 24, 26.5% from 25 to 44, 24.3% from 45 to 64, and 17.5% 65 years of age or older. The median age was 38.8 years. For every 100 females, there were 97.0 males, and for every 100 females age 18 and over, there were 92.4 males age 18 and over. 0.0% of residents lived in urban areas, while 100.0% lived in rural areas.

Of the 845 households, 29.5% had children under the age of 18 living in them. Of all households, 49.1% were married-couple households, 18.3% were households with a male householder and no spouse or partner present, and 25.1% were households with a female householder and no spouse or partner present. About 33.1% of all households were made up of individuals, and 16.6% had someone living alone who was 65 years of age or older.

Of the 935 housing units, 9.6% were vacant. The homeowner vacancy rate was 3.4%, and the rental vacancy rate was 16.3%.

Racial composition as of the 2020 census
Race	Number	Percent
White	1,810	92.4%
Black or African American	3	0.2%
American Indian and Alaska Native	7	0.4%
Asian	18	0.9%
Native Hawaiian and Other Pacific Islander	0	0.0%
Some other race	19	1.0%
Two or more races	101	5.2%
Hispanic or Latino (of any race)	73	3.7%

The non-Hispanic white population was 91.16%.

Demographic estimates

The 2016–2020 5-year American Community Survey estimates show an average household size of 2.6 and an average family size of 3.3. The percent of those with a bachelor's degree or higher was estimated to be 19.4% of the population.

Income and poverty

The 2016–2020 5-year American Community Survey estimates show that the median household income was $55,441 (with a margin of error of +/- $19,244) and the median family income was $79,792 (+/- $6,198). Males had a median income of $45,699 (+/- $4,570) versus $31,369 (+/- $7,789) for females. The median income for those above 16 years old was $39,181 (+/- $5,900). Approximately, 15.0% of families and 14.3% of the population were below the poverty line, including 15.9% of those under the age of 18 and 10.3% of those ages 65 or over.

=== 2010 census ===
As of the 2010 census, there were 2,062 people, 868 households, and 556 families residing in the city. The population density was 1,718.3 inhabitants per square mile (663.4/km^{2}). There were 959 housing units at an average density of 799.2 per square mile (308.6/km^{2}). The racial makeup of the city was 97.9% White, 0.2% African American, 1.0% from other races, and 0.8% from two or more races. Hispanics and Latinos of any race were 3.0% of the population.

There were 868 households, of which 31.0% had children under the age of 18 living with them, 52.6% were married couples living together, 4.0% had a male householder with no wife present, 7.4% had a female householder with no husband present, and 35.9% were non-families. 31.5% of all households were made up of individuals, and 12.5% had someone living alone who was 65 years of age or older. The average household size was 2.32, and the average family size was 2.91.

In the city, the population was spread out, with 25.1% under the age of 18, 6.7% from 18 to 24, 26.0% from 25 to 44, 26.7% from 45 to 64, and 15.5% who were 65 years of age or older. The median age was 38.1 years. For every 100 females, there were 90.9 males. For every 100 females age 18 and over, there were 88.6 males age 18 and over.

The median income for a household in the city was $40,682, and the median income for a family was $57,750. Males had a median income of $40,511 versus $25,982 for females. The per capita income for the city was $22,568. 6.8% of families and 10.9% of the population were below the poverty line, including 11.5% of those under age 18 and 13.8% of those age 65 or over.

== Economy ==
As of 2012, 69.3% of the population over the age of 16 was in the labor force. 1.4% was in the armed forces, and 67.9% was in the civilian labor force with 66.5% being employed and 1.5% unemployed. The composition, by occupation, of the employed civilian labor force was: 32.1% in management, business, science, and arts; 24.3% in sales and office occupations; 14.8% in production, transportation, and material moving; 14.5% in service occupations; and 14.2% in natural resources, construction, and maintenance. The three industries employing the largest percentages of the working civilian labor force were: educational services, and health care and social assistance (28.8%); retail trade (14.9%); and construction (11.3%).

The cost of living in Ellis is relatively low; compared to a U.S. average of 100, the cost of living index for the community is 81.1. As of 2012, the median home value in the city was $85,300, the median selected monthly owner cost was $1,036 for housing units with a mortgage and $397 for those without, and the median gross rent was $564.

== Government ==
Ellis has a mayor-council form of government with a city council consisting of six members. The mayor and all council members are elected for two-year terms. The council meets on the first and third Mondays of each month.

Ellis lies within Kansas's 1st U.S. Congressional District. For the purposes of representation in the Kansas Legislature, the city is located in the 40th district of the Kansas Senate and the 110th district of the Kansas House of Representatives.

== Education ==
=== Primary and secondary education ===
The community is served by Ellis USD 388 public school district, and operates two public schools in the city:

- Washington Grade School (Grades K-6)
- Ellis High School (7–12)

The Roman Catholic Diocese of Salina oversees one Catholic school in Ellis: St. Mary Grade School (Pre-K-6).

The Ellis Railroaders have won the following Kansas State High School championships:

- 1985 Boys Track & Field - Class 3A
- 2009 Girls Track & Field - Class 2A
- 2016 Speech - Class 2A
- 2017 Speech - Class 2A
- 2018 Speech - Class 2A

== Infrastructure ==
=== Transportation ===
Interstate 70 and U.S. Route 40 run concurrently east-west immediately north of Ellis. Kansas Highway 247 (K-247) runs north–south from I-70 to 3rd Street in northern Ellis.

Union Pacific Railroad operates one freight rail line, the Kansas Pacific (KP) line, through Ellis. It runs east–west through the city.

=== Utilities ===
The city government's Public Works department is responsible for sanitation, sewer maintenance, and water provision and distribution. Midwest Energy, Inc. provides electricity to local residents. Eagle Communications and Golden Belt Telephone provide landline telephone service and offer cable television. Most residents use natural gas for heating fuel; service is provided by Midwest Energy, Inc.

== Media ==
The Ellis Review is the local newspaper, published weekly.

Ellis is in the Wichita-Hutchinson, Kansas television market.

== Culture ==
=== Points of interest ===
Ellis is the site of Walter P. Chrysler Boyhood Home and Museum. Chrysler, founder of the Chrysler Corporation, grew up in Ellis. When he was 17, he began his career working in the railroad roundhouse, where he became a machinist's apprentice and developed his expertise for metal working and machinery. In the summer of 1993, the Chrysler Corporation recognized Chrysler's hometown by sponsoring a parade and Chrysler festival, attended by several members of the Chrysler family. A prototype Dodge Viper was loaned to the museum for one year.

Founded in 1994, the Ellis Railroad Museum features items and photographs from Ellis's railroading past. A 5,000-square-foot (460 m^{2}) model train exhibit is also on display. Outside the museum is a miniature railroad that runs on a one-mile (1.6 km) loop track, called the BK&E Railroad. This stands for the "Buddy King and Ellis Railroad", named for its primary donor the late Francis "Buddy" King, a former mayor of Ellis who died in office in 1994.

== Notable people ==
Notable individuals who were born in and/or have lived in Ellis include:

- Martha L. Addis (1878–1942), jeweler in Topeka
- Walter Chrysler (1875–1940), founder of the Chrysler Corporation
- Walt Disney's grandfather Kepple Disney established family farms 3 miles (4.8 km) east of Ellis in 1878. For a time after Walt Disney established Disneyland, the family farms there were known locally as "Disneyland, KS".

== Gallery ==
- Historic Images of Ellis, Special Photo Collections at Wichita State University Library
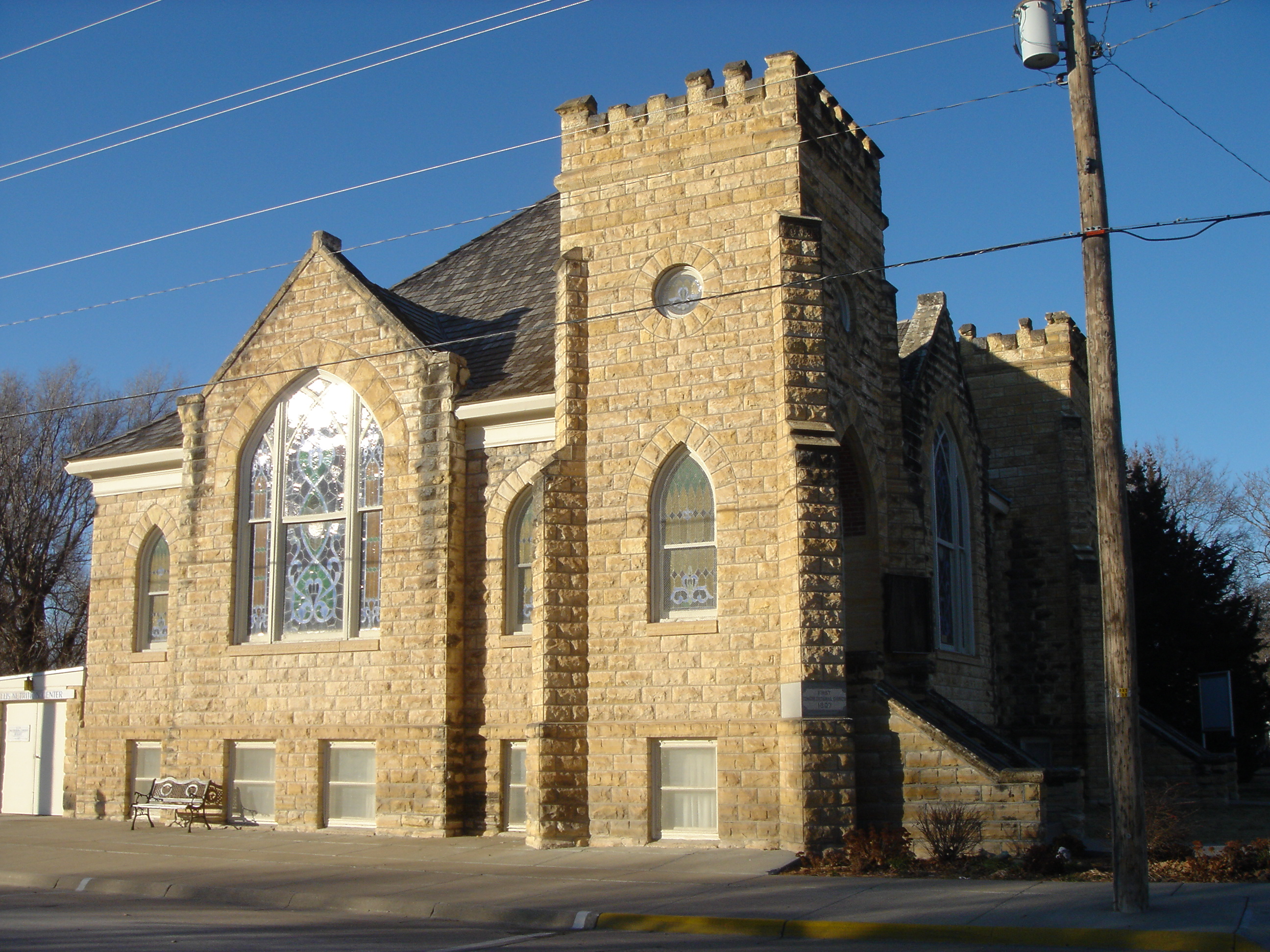
The Bukovina Society of the Americas (2007)

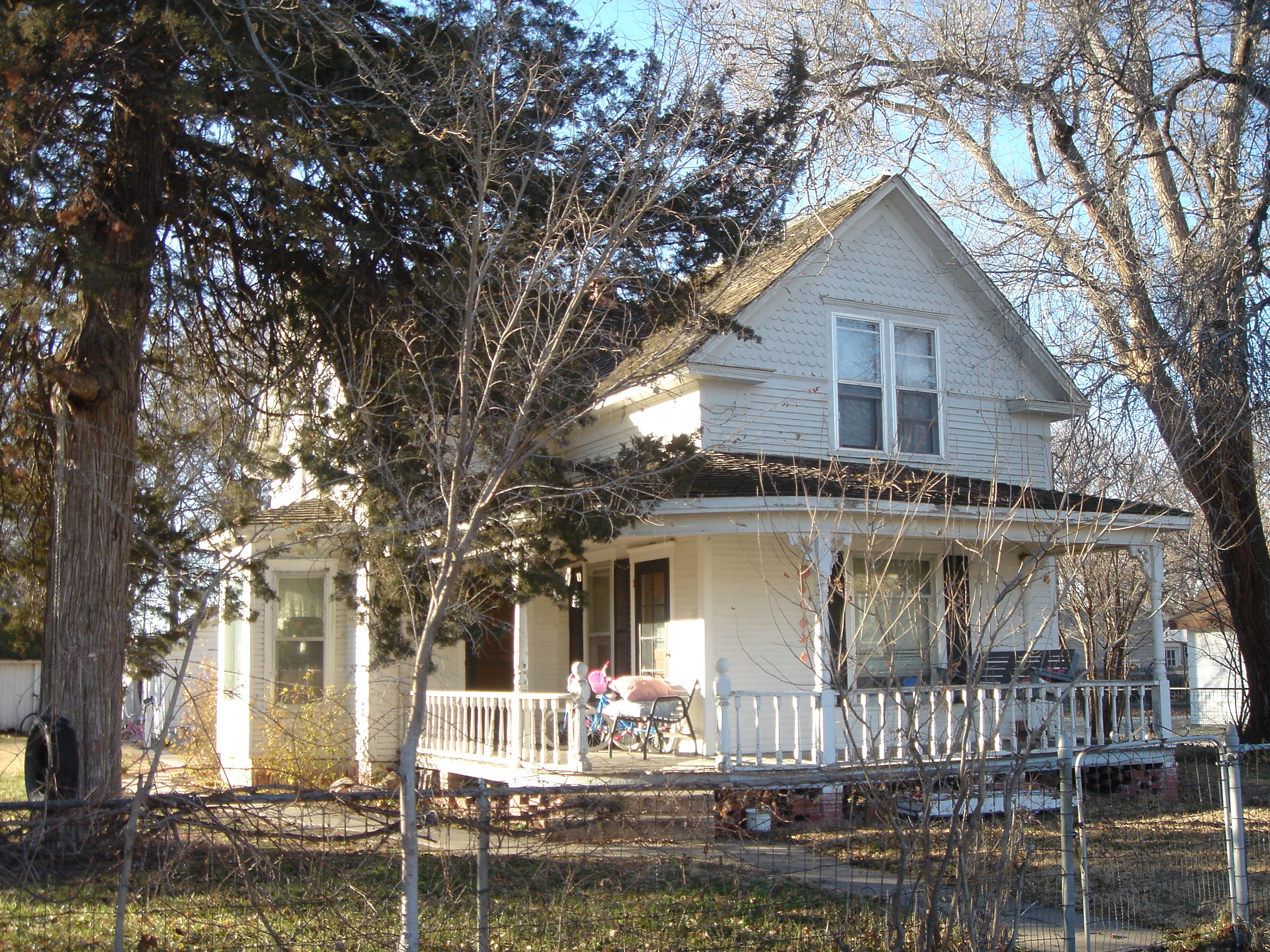
A Victorian house in Ellis (2007)

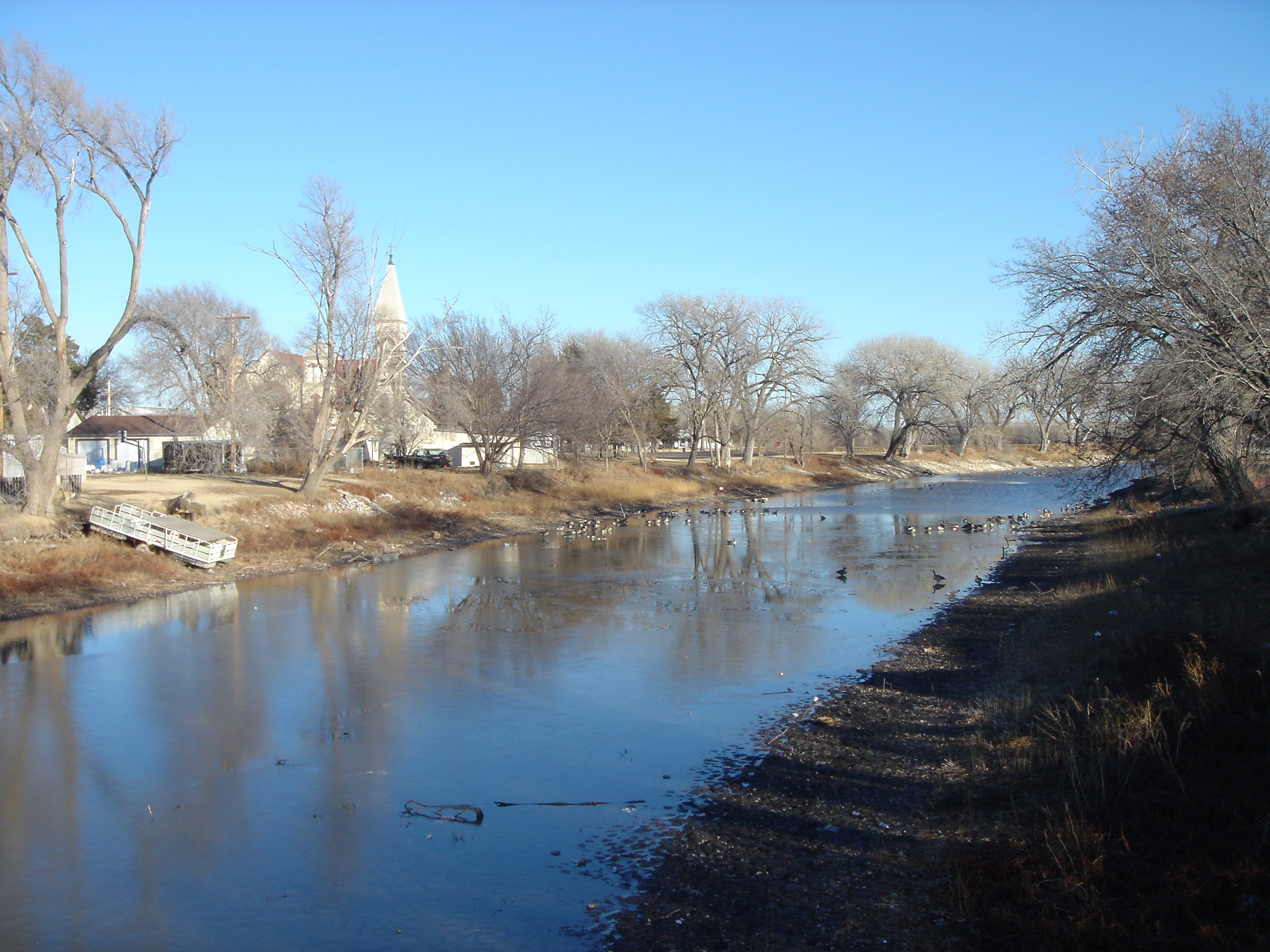
Big Creek Lake (2007)

== See also ==
- List of sundown towns in the United States
