= Erasmus Haworth =

American geologist

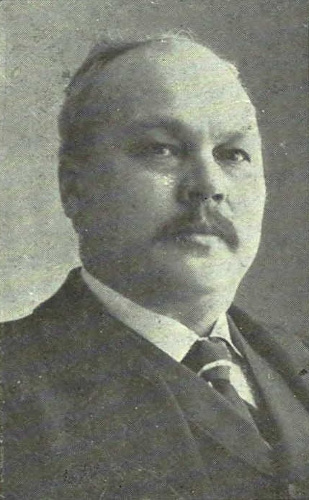
Erasmus Haworth, circa 1908

Erasmus Haworth (1855–1932) was an American geologist.

Born on a farm near Indianola, Iowa, he graduated from the University of Kansas with a Bachelor of Science degree in 1881 and received a master's degree there in 1884. He received his doctoral degree from Johns Hopkins University in 1888. He taught at various colleges, and was appointed professor of geology and mineralogy at the University of Kansas in 1892, where he remained until 1920. Today, Haworth Hall, a building named after Haworth, houses the Division of Biological Sciences at the University of Kansas.

He organized the Kansas Geological Survey in 1894, and wrote several volumes of the survey from 1896 to 1904. He was state geologist from 1894 to 1915. In this position, he was instrumental in finding an ample water supply for Wichita and Newton. In 1903, he collected a sample of gas from a well drilled in Dexter, Kansas and had it analyzed by colleagues in the university's Department of Chemistry. The sample was found to contain helium, which was previously believed to be rare on earth.

In the late 1890s and early 1900s, Haworth repeatedly used his position as state geologist to warn against investing in phony zinc and gold deposits in Trego and Ellis counties, Kansas. The politically influential promoters threatened to have Haworth fired from the university for his interference, but it eventually became clear that the deposits were an illusion and a swindle, and Haworth was vindicated.

Haworth was connected with the United States Geological Survey, and wrote several of its bulletins as well as bulletins for the Missouri Geological Survey and annual bulletins of statistics of the mineralogy and geology of Kansas. He also worked professionally for the Union Pacific Railroad company in Wyoming and Kansas, and for private parties in Kansas and adjacent states. He was a fellow of the Geological Society of America and other scientific societies.
