= Big Creek Township, Ellis County, Kansas =

Big Creek Township
- Township
- Location in Ellis County
- Coordinates: 38°52′42″N 099°18′30″W
- Country: United States
- State: Kansas
- County: Ellis

Area
  - Total: 97.22 sq mi (251.79 km^{2})
  - Land: 97.21 sq mi (251.77 km^{2})
  - Water: 0.0039 sq mi (0.01 km^{2}) 0%
- Elevation: 2,028 ft (618 m)

Population (2020)
  - Total: 2,077
  - Density: 21.37/sq mi (8.250/km^{2})
- GNIS feature ID: 0475180

Big Creek Township is a township in Ellis County, Kansas, United States, named for Big Creek, which flows diagonally through the township from the northwest to the southeast. As of the 2020 census, its population was 2,077.

== History ==
In 2023, the townships of Ellis County were redrawn. Big Creek Township absorbed Lookout Township, which became South Big Creek within the township.

== Geography ==
Big Creek Township covers an area of 97.22 square miles (251.8 km^{2}) surrounding the city of Hays. According to the USGS, it contains two cemeteries: Fort and Fort Hays Memorial Gardens.

A tributary to Big Creek, the stream of Chetolah Creek runs through this township, north to south through the eastern suburbs of Hays.

== Transportation ==
Big Creek Township contains one airport, Hays Municipal Airport.
