= Big Creek (Kansas) =

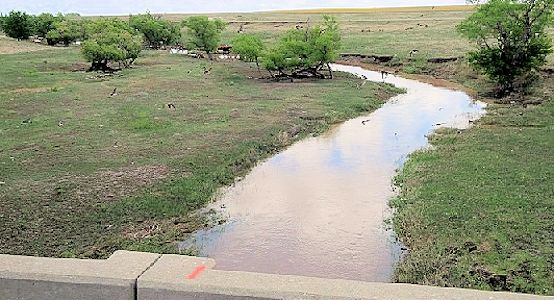
- Big Creek near Ellis, Kansas

Location
- Country: United States
- State: Kansas

Physical characteristics
- Source
  - location: Gove County, Kansas
  - coordinates: 39°06′43″N 100°44′57″W
  - elevation: 2,986 ft (910 m)
- Mouth: Smoky Hill River
  - location: Russell County, Kansas
  - coordinates: 38°47′25″N 98°55′10″W
  - elevation: 1,713 ft (522 m)
- Length: 221 mi (356 km)
- Basin size: 862 mi^{2} (2,230 km^{2})
- Discharge
  - average: 51 cu ft/s (1.4 m^{3}/s)

Basin features
- Watersheds: Big-Smoky Hill-Kansas-Missouri-Mississippi

Big Creek is a 221-mile (356 km) stream in the central Great Plains of North America. It is a tributary of the Smoky Hill River, and the entirety of its length lies in the U.S. state of Kansas.

== Geography ==
Big Creek originates in the High Plains of northwestern Kansas. Its source lies in extreme northwestern Gove County. From there, it flows generally east-southeast through the Smoky Hills to its confluence with the Smoky Hill River in southwestern Russell County.

In Ellis County, Kansas, Big Creek flows through the cities of Ellis and Hays. In Ellis, it is dammed to maintain a small reservoir, Big Creek Lake. In Hays, the creek runs through the campus of Fort Hays State University.

== See also ==
- List of rivers of Kansas
