= Arizona National Livestock Show =

Rodeo and Livestock Show in Arizona

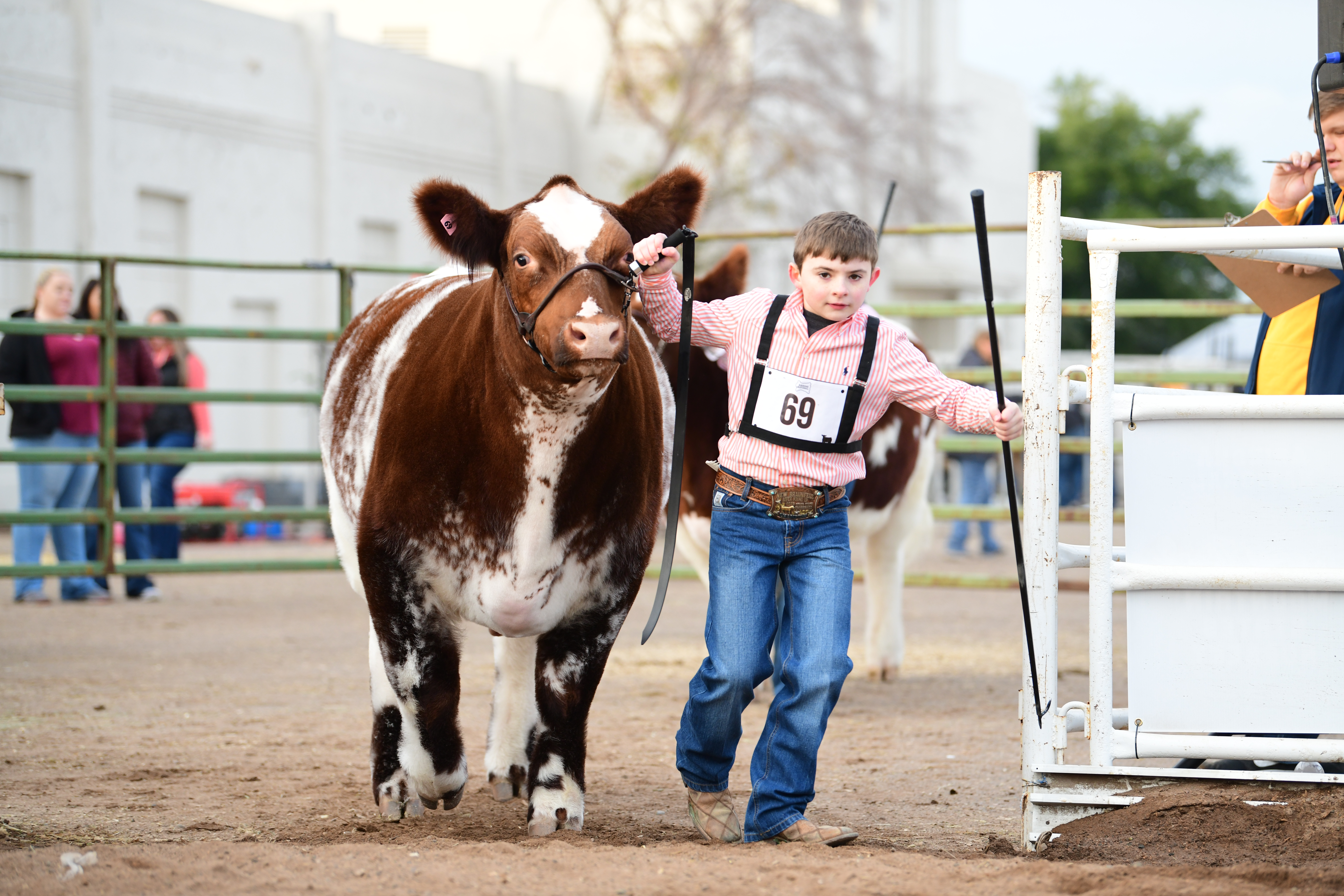
2019 Arizona National Livestock Show

The Arizona National Livestock Show serves as the Southwest's largest livestock show. Dedicated to increasing public awareness of the livestock and agriculture industries and supporting the youth in those industries, the Arizona National Livestock Show has been held annually in Phoenix since 1948, with the exception of 2020 due to the COVID-19 pandemic.

The show is held at the Arizona State Fairgrounds from December 27th-31st and welcomes exhibitors from over 30 states and Canada. Events comprise shows for cattle, sheep, goats, swine, and horses, along with educational programming with Farm Experience and Ag Mechanics. Related programming such as the Stock Dog Trials, Ranch Rodeo, and Cowboy Classics Western Art Show and Sale provide for a diverse experience.

== History ==
=== Early Days: The Phoenix Stock Show (1948–1951) ===
Phoenix Stock Show, 1948

On June 16^{th}, 1948, a select group of Arizona cattle and businessmen gathered at the Westward Ho Hotel to organize what would become the Arizona National Livestock Show. Phoenix-based lawyer Frank Snell was selected from amongst their ranks to become the first show president, and Dr. E.L. Scott and Hester Cochran were tasked with organizing it. The inaugural "Phoenix Stock Show" opened on December 14^{th} 1948 at the Arizona State Fair Commission facilities and welcomed 42 exhibitors from five different states, 449 Hereford, Angus, and Shorthorn cattle, and an estimated 6550 attendees. The show was considered a resounding success and plans for the next one began immediately.

The Board hired Lee and Pearl TePoel, formerly affiliated with the National Western Stock Show in Denver, to take over direction of the show and they moved to Phoenix in summer 1949. The second Phoenix Stock Show, held in January 1950, saw roughly the same attendance despite the addition of a new classification system for junior steers in the junior division. Brahman cattle were added to the show and a calf scramble was planned in a bid to increase public interest and directly appeal to young members of local 4-H clubs and FFA chapters.

=== Going National: The Arizona National Livestock Show (1952–1965) ===
The Phoenix Stock Show continued to grow and, with 13 states represented by exhibitors in 1952, was rebranded to the Arizona National Livestock Show in order to reflect the increasingly national character of the event and its participants. 1953 saw the addition of five buildings on the grounds, an outside show ring, and a night show in order to accommodate larger crowds and interest. The Hereford events proved especially popular and in 1954 the American Hereford Association filmed the Show and planned to use the footage for a film about the Hereford industry. They designated the event as a Hereford Register of Merit Show (ROM) the following year and returned to film the judging of Hereford classes. The number of cattle breeds present also continued to expand, with Santa Gertrudis added in 1957 and Charbray added in 1958.p

Arizona National Livestock Show, 1952

By 1960, only 12 years after the first show and 8 years after its rebranding, the Arizona National Livestock Show welcomed participants from 20 states and initiated partnerships with livestock and community organizations to offer a carcass display (with the Arizona Cattle Feeders Association) and demonstrations of meat cutting (National Livestock and Meat Board) and cooking (Arizona Public Service Company).

The following years saw a brief downturn, with the American Shorthorn Association and the International Charolais Association withdrawing from the breeding classes in 1961, and the loss of the Hereford ROM status in 1962. The Hereford ROM status was restored in 1964 and brought with it the inaugural Quarter Horse Show, complimenting the Arizona Fed Steer Show and the Carcass Show and Sale that were added in 1963. Hollywood began taking note as well, and both Rex Allen and reigning Miss America Vonda Kay Van Dyke were on hand in 1965 to present trophies and launch various events. With the number of events, participants, and attendees growing each year, the board of directors elected to start charging admission in 1965 to help offset expenses. Initial ticket prices were $1 for adults and $0.50 for children per day, or $4 and $1.50 respectively for the entire show

=== The Coliseum Years (1966–1979) ===
Beginning in 1966, the Show was co-sponsored by the Arizona State Fair Commission. The newly finished Veteran's Memorial Coliseum venue was used for Junior division classes, banquets, and entertainment shows, while the outside show rings were reserved for events like the open cattle judging. Financial problems hit the Show in 1968 and 1969, largely due to waning support from the State of Arizona, but efforts from the community of volunteers and exhibitors pulled the Show through.

In 1971 the Show opened with mouthing, tattooing, and ear tagging of Junior Fat Steers and began jaw branding steers that qualified for the junior auction with an "A". The 24^{th} Arizona National Livestock Show in 1972 was also the National Charolais Show and in 1978 Arizona was chosen to host the first ever Polled Hereford Show.

The 1970s also saw the incorporation of numerous non-livestock events, such as an Art Show in 1971 and a Food and Fiber Show in 1972. Arranged by Chuck Far of the Arizona Extension Service, the Food and Fiber Show featured agricultural products from their origin through final processing, such as food products and cotton, along with demonstrations and samples. It proved exceedingly popular and brought in over 8000 school children in 1973 alone. In honor of the Heritage Show in 1976 and Arizona's bicentennial, the Arizona Pioneer Stockmen Association (in collaboration with the Arizona State Cowbelles) was created to publish volumes of Arizona Pioneer Stockmen's history. Other new events included the American Quarter Horse Breed Association's Annual Select Quarter Horse Sale (1977), and the Arizona Agricultural Trade Fair (1977).

Entertainment offerings and celebrity guests grew in stature at the Show, featuring the likes of Rex Allen and his horse Koko (1966), John Wayne (1968), the Quadrille de Mujeres from Maricopa (1974), Lynn Anderson (1975, 1978), Tanya Tucker and Ray Stevens (1976), Tammy Wynette (1977), and Kenny Rogers (1979).

Ladies Lead, introduced in 1979, which was a unique sheep and fashion show that highlighted women of all ages by combining livestock exhibition with fashion, where participants were judged on both their sheep and their wool or wool-blend attire. The event celebrated the full circle of agriculture by showcasing the connection between wool production and finished garments.

=== The Arizona Stock Show & Rodeo (1980–1999) ===
The 1980s and 90s were a period of growth and restructuring, with new divisions, events, and behind-the-scenes organization. 1982 saw numerous organizational changes, such as a revised calf scramble featuring a year-long series of seminars aimed at helping exhibitors to develop a strong understanding of their projects. Other events and awards added in the 1980s included a farrier's contest and Junior Market Swine show (1980), mule show (1984), Premier Exhibitor Award (1984), adult sheep showmanship contest (1985), and the brief addition of Arabians to the horse show (1984-5). The Open Cattle Show also saw changes, with the addition of Limousin in 1981, Simbrah in 1986, and Gelbvieh in 1989.

Arizona National Livestock Show, 1980

The Arizona National Livestock Show Royalty Program was a leadership and outreach opportunity for youth to represent the Arizona National at major agricultural events across the state. Originally established in 1986 with the selection of young women as the Arizona National Queen, the program allowed youth to use their firsthand experience to educate the public, advocate for agriculture, and bridged the gap between the livestock community and those unfamiliar with the industry.

Introduced in 1988, the Gentlemen's Classic was the male counterpart to the Ladies Lead contest, offering men of all ages the opportunity to showcase both their showmanship and style. Participants were judged on their sheep's presentation as well as their own attire, which must be made of wool or a 70% wool-blend, highlighting the connection between livestock and the products they help create.

The 1990s began in earnest with new events, such as the Cowboy Classics show featuring fine western art and gear, and the Western Wit and Wisdom program with cowboy poetry, traditional music, storytelling, and performances. Cowboy Artist Bill Owen was commissioned to produce an exclusive annual series of commemorative art, starting in 1990 with a piece entitled "American Bred Brahman". Horticulture divisions and a Landscape Expo were similarly introduced in 1990, FFA landscape and plant identification competitions in 1991, and the interactive Farm Experience for children in 1997.

The Old Timers Rodeo, a key event at the Arizona National, included various rodeo events such as bareback and saddle bronc riding, bull riding, steer wrestling, calf roping, ladies' barrel racing, and team roping. Initially open to members of the Old Timers Rodeo Association and Arizona residents over 40, the event became increasingly popular, earning recognition as the "Rodeo of the Year" by the National Old Timers Rodeo Association in 1984 and 1985. It was renamed the "Senior Pro Rodeo" in 1993.

Over the years, the event expanded to feature increased sponsorship, larger contestant participation, and enhanced media coverage. In 1996, the Arizona National Livestock Show incorporated a PRCA-sanctioned rodeo, marking a significant step in its evolution, rodeo activities included performances such as team roping, barrel racing, and bull riding. Additionally, the introduction of the Ranch Rodeo and Working Ranch Horse Competition in 1998, along with the debut of the High School Rodeo in 1999, further diversified the rodeo offerings at the show.

In order to reflect the increasingly diverse offerings, the Show's name was once again changed in 1996 to The Arizona Stock Show & Rodeo, although the updated logo was not in use until 1997. The 50th anniversary in 1998 saw the debut of a chuck wagon cook off. Featured entertainers for the anniversary were Daughters of the Purple Sage and Jerry Wayne Olson and Chief (his riding buffalo).

=== 21st century ===
In 2000, the Arizona Historical Foundation established an Arizona National Livestock Show collection as part of its larger archival holdings at Arizona State University's Hayden Library. In the years that followed, new events were added to the show, including the Junior Market Goat Show in 2002, the Saddlebred Show in 2004, the Supreme Stock Horse Show in 2005, and the Stock Dog Competition in 2006. In 2003, the Arizona National Royalty Program transitioned to the Arizona National Ambassador Program, opening the role to both young women and men.

Although the show received a boost in funding the previous year through Arizona Senate Bill 2151, that momentum was short-lived. In 2008, House Bill 2620 cut state funding for fall county fairs and the Arizona National Livestock Show. In response, several cost-saving measures were implemented, such as releasing an online-only premium book, reducing wages, and eliminating the advertising budget. By 2010, the show found itself competing for limited state funds alongside education, corrections, health care for low-income residents, and other essential government programs.

In 2009 and 2010, several high-profile disqualifications at the Arizona National and other livestock shows prompted updates to DNA regulations and other show rules to ensure a fair and safe environment. By 2012, the Arizona National had fully implemented DNA and drug testing for entries. Market goats and lambs, however, still required photographs for registration.

In 2010, the Arizona National Livestock Show expanded its outreach by launching a Facebook page. In 2018 the Show began to livestream events from the rings via Facebook Live. The first official media team was created in partnership with ShowBloom and consisted of 18 interns from nine states. This team managed social media coverage, hosted Facebook Live broadcasts, captured videos, and took photographs that were later shared with exhibitors at no cost. Young champions and exhibitors from across the country continue to be interviewed and featured as the voice of the show. Through social media storytelling including videos, posts, and digital content, these ambassadors work to connect the livestock show to a broader and more diverse audience.

While planning for the 2020 show was already underway, the COVID-19 pandemic forced major changes. In May, staff transitioned to remote work following Arizona Governor Doug Ducey's stay-at-home order. They soon began working with other shows, legal advisors, and insurance providers to develop contingency plans. When the National Western Stock Show announced its cancellation in September, questions quickly arose regarding the status of the Arizona National. By September, the state had created a new process to request approval for events held at the Arizona Exposition and State Fairgrounds. However, the Coliseum was being used as a COVID-19 testing site, raising concerns about public health and safety. On November 19, 2020, Executive Director Tyler Grandil announced that, for the first time since its founding in 1948, the Arizona National Livestock Show would be canceled. The show returned in 2021 and continued to expand its digital presence with the launch of a TikTok account in 2022 and YouTube channel in 2023.

In 2023, the show adjusted its schedule by shortening the overall event and shifting dates to allow exhibitors an extra day after Christmas to arrive. New offerings included a self-check-in process, a sheep fitting clinic and contest, and waived entry fees for junior exhibitor contests. These updates improved efficiency and encouraged greater youth participation.

In 2024, the show continued expanding with the debut of the Farm Simulator Tournament and the addition of a sheep dog trial and Junior Ranch Rodeo. Showmanship entries were offered at no cost to exhibitors. The Top Judge program was added in 2025, offering livestock judging students mentorship from industry leaders.

== Events ==
=== Livestock Shows ===
The Arizona National Livestock Show is the Southwest's largest livestock show, bringing exhibitors from over 30 states and over 4000 head of cattle, horses, sheep, goats, and swine to compete for the "Grand Champion" title. Premium awards for junior and open exhibitors total more than $160,000 yearly. The open cattle show includes supreme champion bull, female, and cow-calf divisions, as well as the Brahman, Brangus, Charolais, Hereford, Miniature Hereford, Maine Anjou, Red Angus, Simmental, All Other Breeds, and All Other Percentage Breeds shows. Cattlemen's Day offers producers the chance to improve their herds through the grading and sale of replacement heifers and commercial bulls.

The Arizona National Livestock Show is one of only four national junior livestock events in America. Junior exhibitors aged 8-19 must have completed a state or national quality assurance training course and continuously owned, been in possession of, and personally cared for their project animals between the entry deadline and the duration of the Show. The Show has awarded over $1,400,000 to date in scholarships to exhibitors.

=== Stock Dog Trials ===
The Stock Dog Trials feature youth and adult cattle dog trials and sheep dog trials. Bringing together skilled dogs and their handlers from across the country, these events showcase the bond between humans and canines and their essential role in ranch life. Divisions include Open, Nursery and Intermediate.

=== Farm Experience ===
The Farm Experience is a mixture of events running throughout the show that are designed to educate about farm animals, their importance in agriculture, and proper care. Focusing on children, the events provide information and interactive experiences that promote learning. The Farm Experience also includes the Farming Simulator Tournament, which asks contestants to manage virtual farms and meet challenges highlighting modern agricultural practices and decision making.

=== Ag Mechanics Show ===
The Ag Mechanics Show is a multi-day event in which students and participants showcase agricultural mechanics projects involving ornamental welding, woodworking, small metal projects, and more. The Ag Mechanics Contest emphasizes the role of mechanics in modern agriculture and promotes innovation among rising agricultural professionals. Ag Mechanics projects are sold through a silent auction.

=== Youth Competitions and Events ===
Youth programs at the Arizona National Livestock Show are designed to promote leadership skills and agricultural education. Contests include livestock judging, public speaking, and skill-a-thon, in which young contestants are asked to demonstrate their knowledge and skills in livestock care, nutrition, and management through tasks and quizzes.

=== Cowboy Classics ===
Cowboy Classics is a Western art show and gear exhibit which has been held continuously for over thirty years as a tribute to the Western lifestyle and the American cowboy. Bronze sculptures, leather and silver works, oil painting, and other media by cowboy artists are showcased and connected to the rich cultural and historical inheritance of the Western tradition. Cowboy Classics has partnered with Art of the Cowgirl, an organization that supports aspiring female artists, to commission one of their fellows each year to do a piece that is auctioned at the annual Show Dedication.

=== Horse Show ===
The Horse Show is held separately at WestWorld of Scottsdale equine complex. Events are tailored to various interests; the American Quarter Horse Association-Approved Quarter Horse Show is the last circuit show of the year and features events such as Ranch Riding, Reining, and Halter.

=== Rodeo Events ===
The Ranch Rodeo is a series of traditional ranching events such as team roping and calf doctoring. Each team of four has four minutes to execute a series of everyday ranch activities, such as roping, branding, doctoring, and loading cattle. The fastest team is declared the winner, with other awards going to Top Horse and Top Hand.

The Li'l Buckaroo Rodeo is a youth event and one of the highlights of the Arizona National Livestock Show. Boys and girls ages 4-6, weighing no more than 60lbs, compete in sheep riding with the top two riders in each age group proceeding to the finals. Older youth can compete in the Youth Ranch Rodeo.

=== Pioneer Stockman Association ===
The Arizona Pioneer Stockmen Association, established in 1976, honors men and women in the livestock industry who helped shape the state of Arizona. The association offers members recognition, access to annual events like the Arizona National Livestock Show, and the chance to share their life stories. These stories are published in the Pioneer Ranch Histories, a series of volumes preserving firsthand accounts of pioneer life. The goal is to record and celebrate the triumphs and hardships of Arizona's early agricultural contributors for future generations.

== Presidents ==
- Frank Snell (1948–1958)
- Sterling Hebbard (1959–1965)
- Dr. Bart Cardon (1966–1970)
- Thomas Goodnight (1971–1972)
- Warren Langfitt (1973–1974)
- Chet Johns (1974–1977)
- Jim Webb (1978–1979)
- Dan Finch (1980–1981)
- Gene Sparks (1982–1983)
- Frank Armer Jr. (1984–1986)
- Rick Johns (1987)
- Jim Lewis (1988–1989)
- Tom Rolston (1990–1991)
- John Fowler (1992–1993)
- Grant Boice (1994–1995)
- Connie Cowan (1996–1997)
- Con Englehorn (1998–1999)
- Duane Webb (2000–2001)
- Brenda Mayberry (2002–2003)
- Galyn Knight (2004–2005)
- Clay White (2006–2007)
- Terry Van Hilsen (2008–2009)
- Ron Pint (2010–2011)
- Rick Hanger (2012–2013)
- Jim Loughead (2014–2015)
- Dean Fish (2016–2017)
- Scott Loughead (2018–2019)
- Garrett Ham (2020–2021)
- Patrick Bray (2022–2023)
- Tiffany Selchow (2024–2025)
- Shea Nieto (2025-present)

== Show Dedicatees ==
- John M. Jacobs (1967)
- Sterling Hebbard (1970)
- Riney B. Salmon, Jr. (1971)
- Frank S. Boice (1974)
- William Davis (1976)
- Raymond Latta (1978)
- Henry Gudgell Boice (1980)
- Doris Armer (1981)
- Warren Langfitt (1982)
- J. Charles Wetzler (1984)
- Frank L. Snell (1985)
- Louis Horrell (1986)
- Oscar Ray Crigler (1987)
- E. Ray Cowden (1988)
- Valley National Bank (1989)
- Betty Accomazzo and Steve Bixby, Sr. (1990)
- Rose Mofford (1992)
- Lee and Pearl TePoek (1993)
- Palmer Keith (1994)
- Bart Cardon (1995)
- H. Lynn and Marjorie Anderson (1996)
- Milton "Bud" Webb (1997)
- Ethel M. Marley (1998)
- Delbert Pierce (1999)
- Rob and Mary Hooper (2000)
- Don Charles (2001)
- Alex Dees (2002)
- Chuck and Maxine Lakin (2003)
- Jim Lewis (2004)
- Larry Stark (2005)
- Bob and Miriam Boice (2006)
- Nellie Stevenson (2007)
- Past Presidents: 1948–2007 (2008)
- Clay and Roni White (2009)
- Fritzi Collins (2010)
- Louis Maxcy (2011)
- JoAnn "Jody" Yeager (2012)
- John and Bobbie Kerr (2013)
- Lyle Wright (2014)
- Con Englehorn (2015)
- Galyn Knight (2016)
- Marvin Selke (2017)
- Marilyn Harris (2018)
- Tom Miller (2019)
- Grant Boice (2020–2021)
- Cindy Tidwell (2022)
- Terry Van Hilsen (2023)
- Gerald Lewis (2024)

== Show Managers and Executive Directors ==
- E.L. Scott (1948–49)
- Lee and Pearl TePoel (1950–1973)
- John Creighton (1974–75)
- Nellie Stevenson (1976–88)
- Tom Jones (1989–90)
- Gerri Craig (1991–95)
- Grant Boice (1996–2013)
- Michael Bradley (2013–15)
- Tyler Grandil (2016-present)
