= National Register of Historic Places listings in Ellis County, Kansas =

Location of Ellis County in Kansas

This is a list of the National Register of Historic Places listings in Ellis County, Kansas.

This is intended to be a complete list of the properties and districts on the National Register of Historic Places in Ellis County, Kansas, United States. The locations of National Register properties and districts for which the latitude and longitude coordinates are included below, may be seen in a map.

There are 21 properties and districts listed on the National Register in the county. Another 2 properties were once listed have been removed.

This National Park Service list is complete through NPS recent listings posted June 19, 2026.

== Current listings ==
	Name on the Register	Image	Date listed	Location	City or town	Description
1	Justus Bissing Jr. Historic District	Justus Bissing Jr. Historic District	January 28, 2004 (#03001495)	502-504 W. 12th St. 38°52′31″N 99°20′13″W	Hays	Home built by craftsman Justus Bissing, Jr., and service station built for his son.
2	Brungardt-Dreiling Farmstead		October 11, 2016 (#16000704)	2567 Golf Course Rd. 38°51′24″N 99°08′20″W	Victoria	
3	Chestnut Street Historic District	Chestnut Street Historic District	July 9, 2008 (#06000621)	Main, W. 9th, W. 10th, W. 11th, E. 11th, and E. 12th Sts.; also 1302 Main St. 38°56′12″N 99°33′37″W	Hays	1302 Main represents a boundary increase of May 24, 2011; a second boundary increase was approved July 25, 2022.
4	Walter P. Chrysler House	Walter P. Chrysler House	February 23, 1972 (#72000495)	104 W. 10th St. 38°56′11″N 99°33′39″W	Ellis	
5	Drees House	Drees House	March 2, 2001 (#01000183)	100 E. 19th St. 38°52′42″N 99°19′34″W	Hays	
6	Ellis Congregational Church	Ellis Congregational Church	March 9, 2000 (#00000156)	Eighth and Washington Sts. 38°56′26″N 99°33′38″W	Ellis	
7	First Presbyterian Church	First Presbyterian Church	March 30, 1973 (#73000753)	100 W. 7th St. 38°52′15″N 99°19′50″W	Hays	Listed church is on the right.
8	Fort Fletcher Stone Arch Bridge	Fort Fletcher Stone Arch Bridge	May 18, 2001 (#01000385)	4.8 miles (7.7 km) south of Walker, Walker Ave. 38°47′53″N 99°04′39″W	Walker	
9	Fort Hays	Fort Hays	January 25, 1971 (#71000314)	Frontier Historical Park; 38°51′46″N 99°20′06″W	Hays	
10	Gallagher House	Gallagher House	March 2, 2001 (#01000184)	310 E. 20th St. 38°52′39″N 99°19′17″W	Hays	
11	George Grant Villa	George Grant Villa	April 26, 1972 (#72000496)	2680 Grants Villa Road; 38°46′05″N 99°07′11″W	Victoria	
12	Holy Cross Church and School		June 22, 2026 (#100013143)	1606 Sarratov Street; 38°42′31″N 99°09′56″W	Pfeifer	
13	Memorial City Hall	Memorial City Hall	March 15, 2007 (#07000142)	911 Washington St. 38°56′18″N 99°33′36″W	Ellis	
14	Merchants Bank of Ellis	Merchants Bank of Ellis	May 2, 2002 (#02000428)	822 Washington St. 38°56′20″N 99°33′38″W	Ellis	
15	J.A. Mermis House	J.A. Mermis House	April 8, 2009 (#09000190)	1401 Ash Street; 38°52′34″N 99°19′56″W	Hays	
16	Papes Barn	Papes Barn	October 5, 2015 (#15000689)	890 Ellis Ave. 38°48′39″N 99°33′25″W	Ellis	
17	Pawnee Tipi Ring Site and Golden Spring Beach		July 2, 2018 (#100002307)	Address Restricted	Hays	
18	Philip Hardware Store	Philip Hardware Store	March 16, 1982 (#82002658)	719 Main St. 38°52′14″N 99°19′54″W	Hays	
19	St. Fidelis Catholic Church	St. Fidelis Catholic Church	May 14, 1971 (#71000315)	Southeastern corner of St. Anthony and Delaware Sts. 38°51′24″N 99°09′01″W	Victoria	
20	St. Joseph's Church and Parochial School	St. Joseph's Church and Parochial School	November 19, 2008 (#08001066)	210 and 217 W. 13th St. 38°51′24″N 99°09′01″W	Hays	
21	Washington Grade School		April 1, 2021 (#100006323)	305 Main St. 38°52′01″N 99°20′03″W	Hays	

== Former listings ==
	Name on the Register	Image	Date listed	Date removed	Location	City or town	Description
1	Krueger Building		March 8, 2006 (#06000111)	January 2, 2013	811 Fort St. 38°52′13″N 99°20′01″W	Hays	Demolished in 2012.
2	Madden Elevator		June 29, 1982 (#82002657)	January 2, 1985	117 E. 9th St.	Hays	Demolished in October, 1984.

== See also ==
- List of National Historic Landmarks in Kansas
- National Register of Historic Places listings in Kansas
