= Angus cattle =

In cattle, Angus may refer to:

- Aberdeen Angus, a breed of beef cattle in Scotland and the United Kingdom
- American Angus
- German Angus
- Red Angus

== See also ==
- Australian Lowline
