= ANGUS =

ANGUS may refer to:

- Acoustically Navigated Geological Underwater Survey, a deep-towed still-camera sled for underwater exploration
- Air National Guard of the United States, a designated military reserve component of the US

== See also ==
- Angus (disambiguation)
