= Angus =

Angus may refer to:

== Cattle ==
- Angus cattle, various breeds of beef cattle

== Art ==
- Angus (film), a 1995 film
- Angus Og (comics), in the Daily Record

== Places ==
=== Australia ===
- Angus, New South Wales

=== Canada ===
- Angus, Ontario, a community in Essa, Ontario
- East Angus, Quebec

=== Scotland ===
- Angus, Scotland, a Scottish council and lieutenancy area
- Angus (Scottish Parliament constituency)
- Angus (UK Parliament constituency)

=== United States ===
- Angus, Iowa
- Angus, Nebraska
- Angus, Ohio
- Angus, Texas
- Angus, Wisconsin
- Angus Township, Polk County, Minnesota

== People ==
=== Historical figures ===
- Óengus I of the Picts (died 761), king of the Picts
- Óengus of Tallaght (died 824), Irish bishop, reformer and writer
- Óengus II of the Picts (died 834), king of the Picts
- Óengus mac Óengusa (died 930), Irish poet
- Óengus of Moray (died 1130), last King of Moray
- Aonghus Mór (died c. 1293), chief of Clann Domhnaill
- Aonghus Óg of Islay (died 1314×1318/c.1330), chief of Clann Domhnaill
- Aonghas Óg (died 1490), chief of Clann Domhnaill
- Óengus mac Nad Froích (died 489), King of Munster
- The Mormaer of Angus, later the Earl of Angus

=== Mythology and fiction ===
- Aengus, figure of Irish mythology
- Óengus Olmucaid, legendary High King of Ireland
- Óengus Ollom, legendary High King of Ireland
- Óengus Tuirmech Temrach, legendary High King of Ireland
- Angus, a character on Oobi
- Angus "Pothole" McDuck, a Disney character who is Scrooge McDuck's uncle
- Angus, a Thane in Shakespeare's Macbeth

=== Names ===
- Angus (given name), origin of the name, list of people with the name
- Angus (surname)

== Other uses ==
- Acoustically Navigated Geological Underwater Survey (ANGUS), a deep-towed still camera sled
- Angus Book Award, literary award for UK authors of teenage fiction
- Angus Burger (Burger King), sandwich available at Burger King
- Angus College, college in Arbroath, Scotland
- Angus Folk Museum, a centre for agricultural history and rural life located near Forfar, Angus
- Angus Herald, a current Scottish herald of arms in Extraordinary of the Court of the Lord Lyon
- Angus Automobile Company, a defunct American company; see Fuller

== See also ==
- Angus cattle (disambiguation)
- Óengus mac Fergusa (disambiguation)
- Onuist (disambiguation)
- Agnus (disambiguation)
