= Henry Cho =

American stand-up comedian (born 1962)

- Born: December 30, 1962 (age 63); Knoxville, Tennessee, U.S.
- Occupation: Comedian
- Years active: 1986–present
- Spouse: Amy Cavender Cho
- Children: 3
- Website: henrychocomedy.com

Henry Cho (born December 30, 1962) is an American stand-up comedian. Cho has performed at the Grand Ole Opry over 100 times and on January 6, 2023, he became the first Asian-American invited to become a member of the Opry. Cho is also the first comedian to become an Opry member since 1973.

== Career ==
Cho is well-known as a "clean" comedian, forgoing profanity and objectionable material, and has sometimes been called "Mr. Clean". Cho often uses his childhood experiences as an Asian American in the South in his comedy. "I'm an Asian with a Southern accent", he said. "To a lot of people, that right there is funny." He has however stated that he avoids low level comedy to make fun of Asian people using stereotypes, stating "I never want to do anything derogatory toward the Korean community, and Asians as a whole. There’s some easy laughs I could get, but I’ve always steered away from them."

Cho appeared on many television shows in the late 1980s and early 90s, including The Arsenio Hall Show, Bob Hope's Young Comedians Special, MTV's 1/2 Hour Comedy Hour, VH-1's Stand-Up Spotlight, and A&E's An Evening at the Improv. His other TV credits include guest roles on sitcoms such as Designing Women, Lenny, The New WKRP in Cincinnati and a starring role in the TV movie Revenge of the Nerds III: The Next Generation. In 1994, after he moved back to Tennessee, Cho got a call from NBC to host a revamped version of Friday Night Videos titled Friday Night. For two years, he commuted to Los Angeles weekly. More recently he appeared on The Tonight Show with Jay Leno and The Late Late Show with Craig Ferguson. He was also the keynote speaker for the 59th Annual Radio and Television Correspondents' Dinner.

He has appeared in three feature films. In 1997, he starred opposite Tom Arnold and David Alan Grier in McHale's Navy. In 2001, he appeared in the Farrelly Brothers' movie Say It Isn't So with Heather Graham and Chris Klein. In 2006, he appeared in Material Girls starring Hilary and Haylie Duff.

During the holiday seasons of 2003 and 2004, Cho toured the U.S. with Amy Grant and Vince Gill, appearing live during the couple's show.

In 2006, he had his own Comedy Central special entitled Henry Cho: What's That Clickin' Noise? in which Jeff Foxworthy, Bill Engvall, and Larry the Cable Guy were special guest voices in the opening scene.

In 2007, he signed a deal with Touchstone Pictures and ABC to write, produce and star in a television situation comedy series centered on Korean-Americans living in the South. In 2009, he signed a deal with CBS/Paramount to write, produce and star in another sitcom with Craig Ferguson as executive producer. In 2011, Cho had a special/pilot "The Henry Cho Show" on Great American Country (GAC).

His work can be heard nationwide several times weekly on SiriusXM Radio's Channel 98, Laugh USA, Sirius Radio's Jeff and Larry's Comedy Roundup Channel 97, and Pandora Radio's PG Comedy Radio Channel.

== Personal life ==
Of Korean descent, Cho was born and raised in Knoxville, Tennessee. His father worked at Oak Ridge National Laboratory. He entered standup comedy in 1986. He attended West High School, the University of Tennessee at Knoxville and moved to Los Angeles, California, in 1989 to pursue his career, but always with the intent of returning to his roots in Tennessee.

He is married to Amy Cho (née Cavender), who is from Arab, Alabama and has 3 children. Cho was previously a hay farmer and continues to farm angus cattle at his property in Gallatin, Tennessee. He is a practicing Christian and a fan of the Tennessee Volunteers football team.

== Filmography ==
- Designing Women (1989)
- Revenge of the Nerds III: The Next Generation (1992)
- Bandit: Beauty and the Bandit (1994)
- McHale's Navy (1997)
- Say It Isn't So (2001)
- Material Girls (2006)
- The Farmer and the Belle: Saving Santa Land (2020)

== Discography ==
- What's That Clickin' Noise? (2006; Warner Brothers/Comedy Central)
