= Hungus =

Hungus may refer to:

- A variant form of the name Ungus
- A fictional creature in Infocom's text adventure Beyond Zork
- Karl Hungus, a minor character in The Big Lebowski
- A nonsensical word indicating frustration/happiness.
