= Argo (ROV) =

Unmanned deep-towed undersea video camera sled

Argo is launched from the Knorr during the 1985 Titanic expedition.

Argo is an unmanned deep-towed undersea video camera sled developed by Dr. Robert Ballard through Woods Hole Oceanographic Institute's Deep Submergence Laboratory. Argo is most famous for its role in the discovery of the wreck of the RMS Titanic in 1985. Argo would also play the key role in Ballard's discovery of the wreck of the battleship Bismarck in 1989.

== See also ==
- Acoustically Navigated Geological Underwater Survey (ANGUS)
