= Aberdeen Angus =

Scottish breed of beef cattle

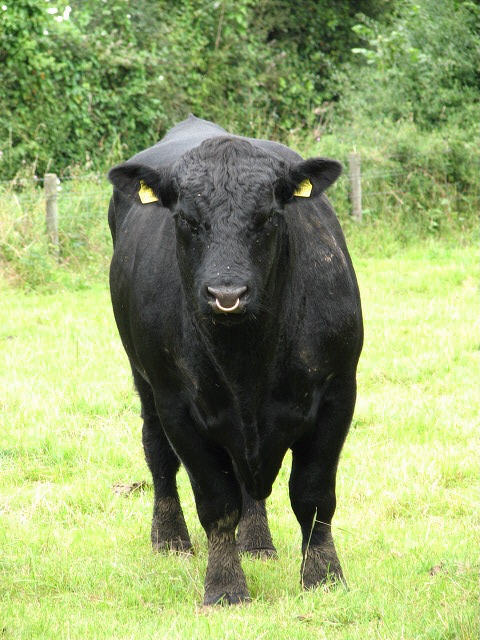
- A bull near Melton Constable, in Norfolk

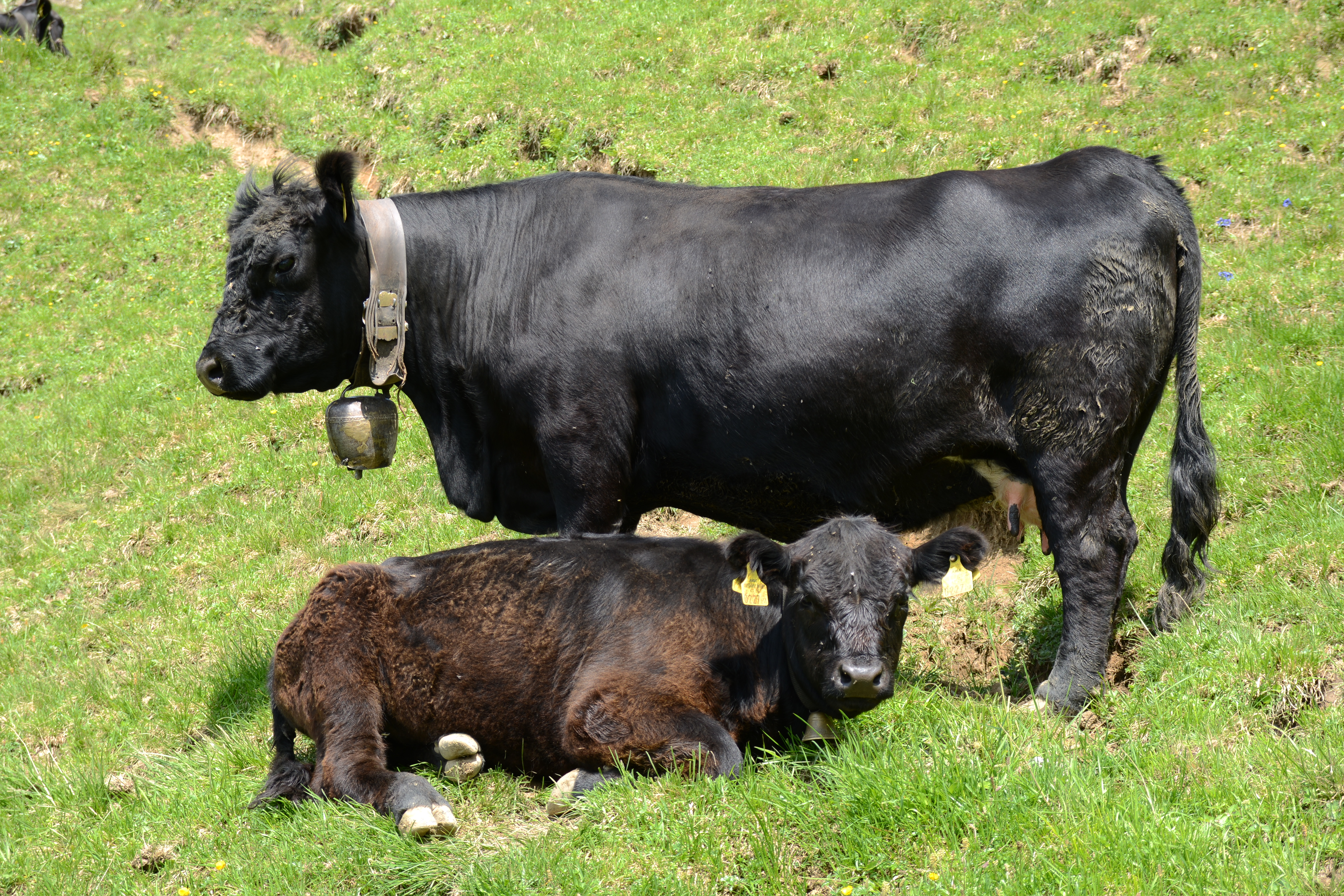
- Cow and calf in the Austrian Alps
- Conservation status: FAO (2007), worldwide: not at risk; DAD-IS (2021): not at risk; RBST (2021); Overall: UK native breeds; Native type: at risk
- Other names: Angus; Aberdeen-Angus; Angus Doddie; Buchan Humlie
- Country of origin: United Kingdom
- Distribution: all five inhabited continents
- Use: beef

Traits
- Weight: Male: 1,000 kg; Female: 650 kg
- Height: Male: 145 cm; Female: 135 cm
- Coat: black or red
- Horn status: polled
- Cattle; Bos (primigenius) taurus

The Aberdeen Angus, sometimes simply Angus, is a Scottish breed of small beef cattle. It derives from cattle native to the counties of Aberdeen, Banff, Kincardine and Angus in north-eastern Scotland. In 2018, it accounted for over 17% of the beef production in the United Kingdom.

The breed developed in north-eastern Scotland, where hornless cattle were once known as "Angus Doddies" and "Buchan Humlies". It was officially recognised in 1835 and was first exported in the 1820s, to Tasmania. Exports to North America and Argentina followed in the 1870s. In the United States, the breed split into two: the American Angus and the Red Angus. The split came after the American registry stopped accepting red animals in 1917.

The Angus is naturally polled and solid black or red The cattle have been exported to many countries of the world; there are large populations in Australia, Canada, New Zealand, South America and the United States, where it has developed into two separate and distinct breeds, the American Angus and the Red Angus. In some countries it has been bred to be taller than the native Scottish stock.

Its conservation status worldwide is "not at risk"; in the United Kingdom the original Native Aberdeen Angus – cattle not influenced by cross-breeding with imported stock – is listed by the Rare Breeds Survival Trust as "at risk".

== History ==
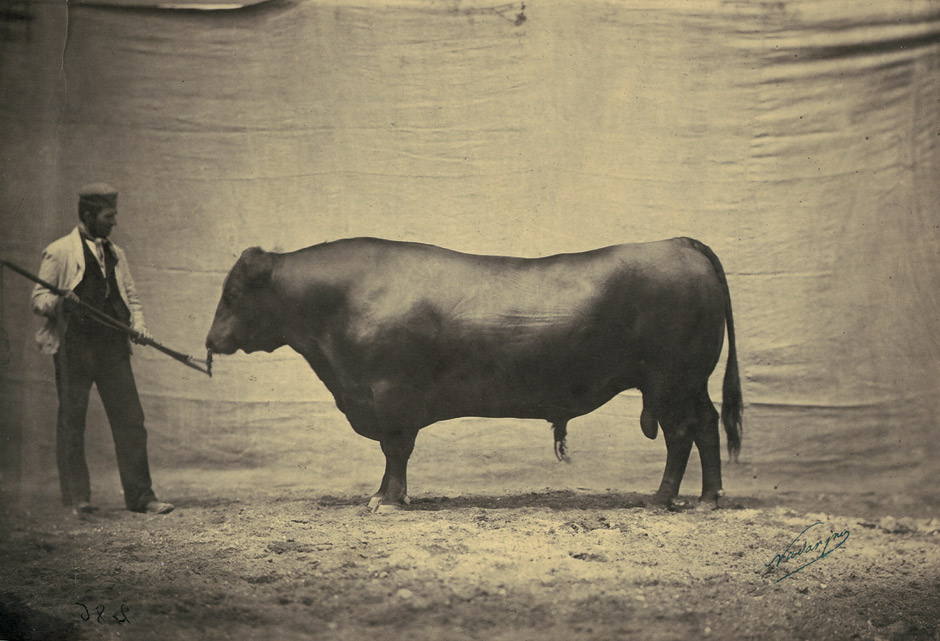
Historic salt print of a bull at an agricultural fair in Paris in 1856

For some time before the 1800s, the hornless cattle in Angus were called "Angus Doddies", while those in the historic province of Buchan (later part of Aberdeenshire) were known as "Buchan Humlies", both "doddie" and "humlie" meaning “polled”. In 1824, William McCombie of Tillyfour, later the Member of Parliament for West Aberdeenshire, began to improve the stock and is regarded today as the father of the breed. The breed was officially recognised in 1835, and was initially registered together with the Galloway in the Polled Herd Book. A breed society was formed in 1879. The cattle became commonplace throughout the British Isles in the mid-twentieth century.

=== Argentina ===
As stated in the fourth volume of the Herd Book of the UK's Angus, this breed was introduced to Argentina in 1879 when "Don Carlos Guerrero" imported one bull and two cows for his Estancia "Charles" located in Juancho, Partido de General Madariaga, Provincia de Buenos Aires. The bull was born on 19 April 1878; named "Virtuoso 1626" and raised by Colonel Ferguson. The cows were named "Aunt Lee 4697" raised by J. James and "Cinderela 4968" raised by R. Walker and were both born in 1878, on 31 January and 23 April respectively.

=== Australia ===
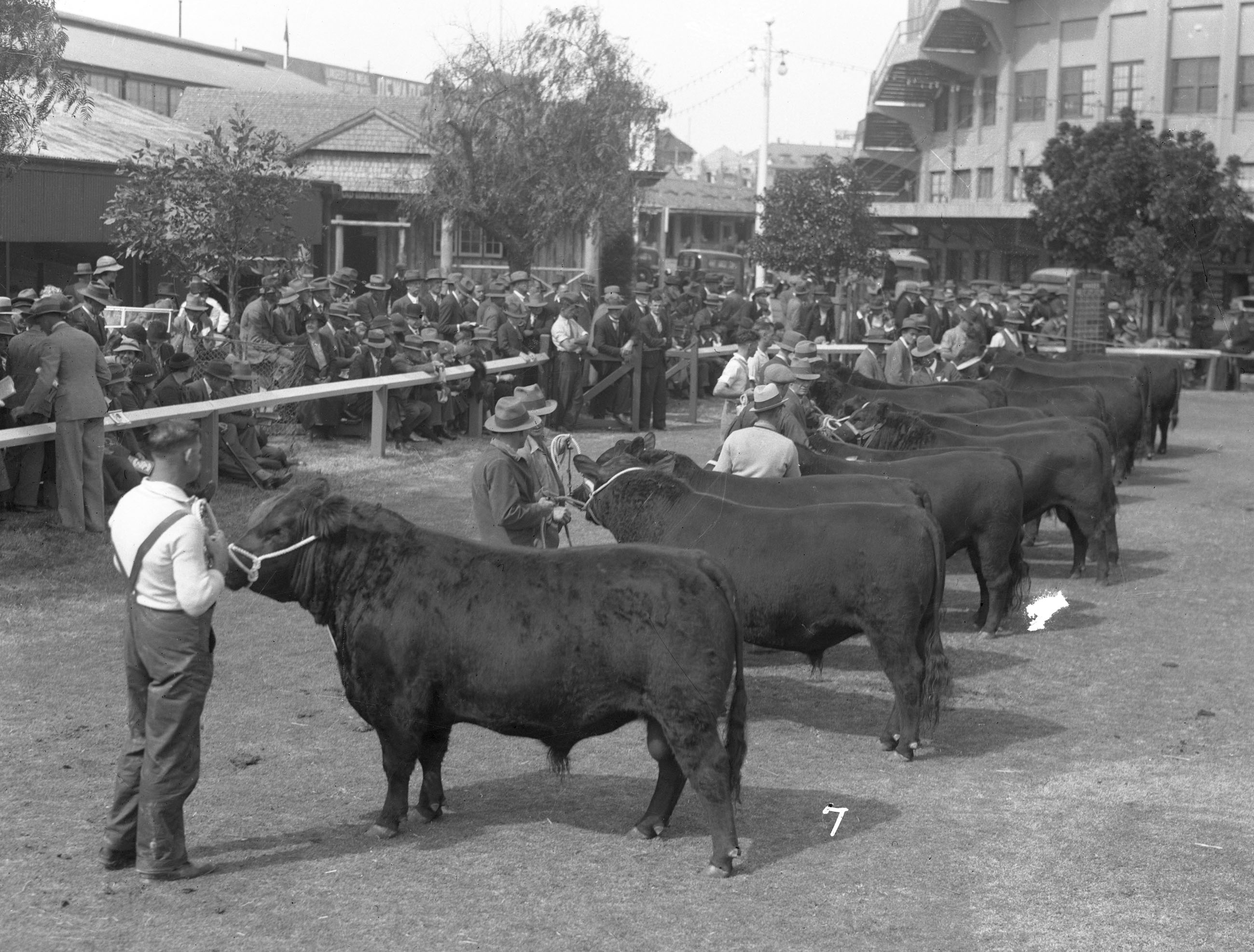
Judging bulls at the Royal Sydney Easter Show of 1935

Angus cattle were first introduced to Van Diemen's Land (now Tasmania) in the 1820s, and to the southern mainland in 1840. The breed is now found in all Australian states and territories with 62000 calves registered with Angus Australia in 2010.

=== Canada ===
In 1876 William Brown, a professor of agriculture and then superintendent of the experimental farm at Guelph, Ontario, was granted permission by the government of Ontario to purchase Aberdeen Angus cattle for the Ontario Agricultural College. The herd comprised a yearling bull, Gladiolus, and a cow, Eyebright, bred by the Earl of Fife and a cow, Leochel Lass 4th, bred by R.O. Farquharson. On 12 January 1877, Eyebright gave birth to a calf, sired by Sir Wilfrid. It was the first to be born outside of Scotland. The OAC went on to import additional bulls and cows, eventually began selling Aberdeen Angus cattle in 1881.

=== United States ===
On 17 May 1873, George Grant brought four Angus bulls, without any cows, to Victoria, Kansas. These were seen as unusual as the normal American cattle consisted of Shorthorns and Longhorns, and the bulls were used only in crossbreeding; however, the farmers noticed the good qualities of these bulls, and afterwards many more cattle of both sexes were imported.

On 21 November 1883, the American Angus Association was founded in Chicago, Illinois. The first herd book was published in March 1885. At this time, both red and black animals were registered without distinction. in 1917, it barred the registering of red and other coloured animals in an effort to promote a solid black breed. The Red Angus Association of America was founded in 1954 by breeders of Red Angus cattle. It was formed because the breeders had had their cattle struck off the herd book for not conforming to the changed breed standard regarding colour.

=== Germany ===
A separate breed was cross bred in Germany called the German Angus. It is a cross between the Angus and several different cattle such as the German Black Pied Cattle, Gelbvieh, and Fleckvieh. The cattle are usually larger than the Angus and appear in black and red colours.

== Characteristics ==
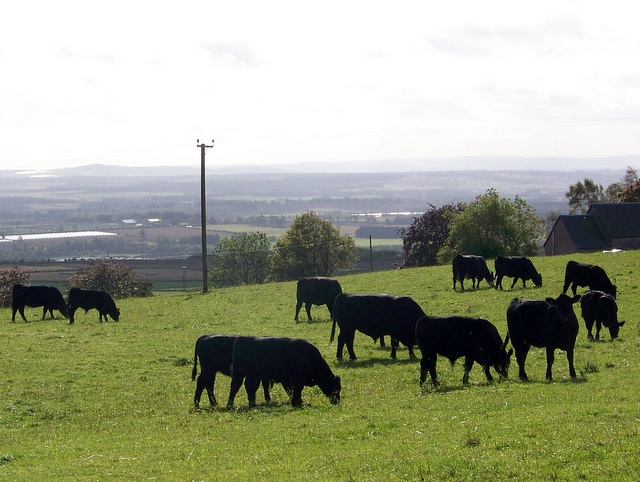
At pasture in West Tullyfergus, near Blairgowrie and Rattray in Perth and Kinross

Because of their native environment, the cattle are very hardy and can survive the Scottish winters, which are often harsh, with snowfall and storms. Cows weigh about 550 kilograms (1,210 lb) and bulls some 850 kilograms (1,870 lb). Bulls may be used on dairy cows to produce a beef calf. The cattle are naturally polled and may be either black or red. They reach maturity earlier than some other native British breeds such as the Hereford or North Devon. The cattle have a large muscle content and are regarded as medium-sized. In Japan the meat is prized for its marbling. Among the recessive genetic defects that can affect the cattle are: arthrogryposis multiplex ("curly calf"); neuropathic hydrocephalus ("water head"); contractural arachnodactyly or "fawn calf syndrome"; dwarfism; osteoporosis; and notomelia.

== Use ==
The Aberdeen Angus is reared principally for beef. Bulls are used extensively as terminal sires on cows of other breeds – particularly dairy breeds – to produce cross-bred beef calves. The meat can be marketed as superior due to its marbled appearance. Bulls can also be used to transmit characteristics including the polled gene (for ease of handling) and – with the aim of lowering the incidence of dystocia – the easy calving of cows.

Many modern breeds derive from the Aberdeen Angus or from its American derivatives, the American Angus and Red Angus of the United States. Among those created by cross-breeding are: the Murray Grey and Wokalup of Australia; the Ibagé (with Nelore) of Brazil; the Pee Wee of Canada; the Romosinuano (with Costeño con Cuernos) of Colombia; the Jamaica Black (with Brahman); the Japanese Polled (with indigenous Japanese cattle); the Afrigus (with Afrikaner) of South Africa; the Volynsk and Znamensk of Ukraine; and the Africangus (with Afrikaner), the Amerifax (with Beef Friesian), the Barzona (with Afrikaner, Hereford and Santa Gertrudis), the Brangus (with Brahman), the Holgus (with Holstein) and the Regus (Red Angus × Hereford) of the United States The Australian Lowline is not a cross-breed but the unexpected result of a research experiment using only Aberdeen Angus stock.

== See also ==
- Ayrshire cattle – Breed of cattle
- Beef Shorthorn – Breed of cattle
- Belted Galloway – Scottish breed of cattle
- Highland cattle – Scottish breed of cattle
- Luing cattle – Breed of cattle
