= German Angus =

German breed of cattle

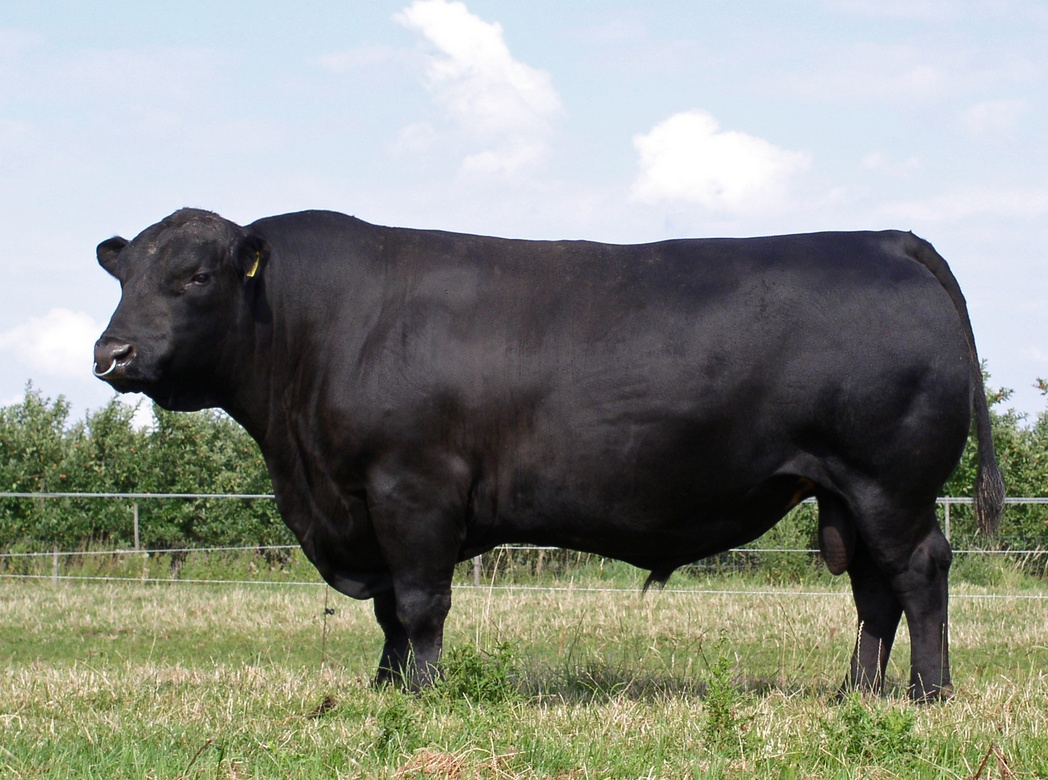
- Bull

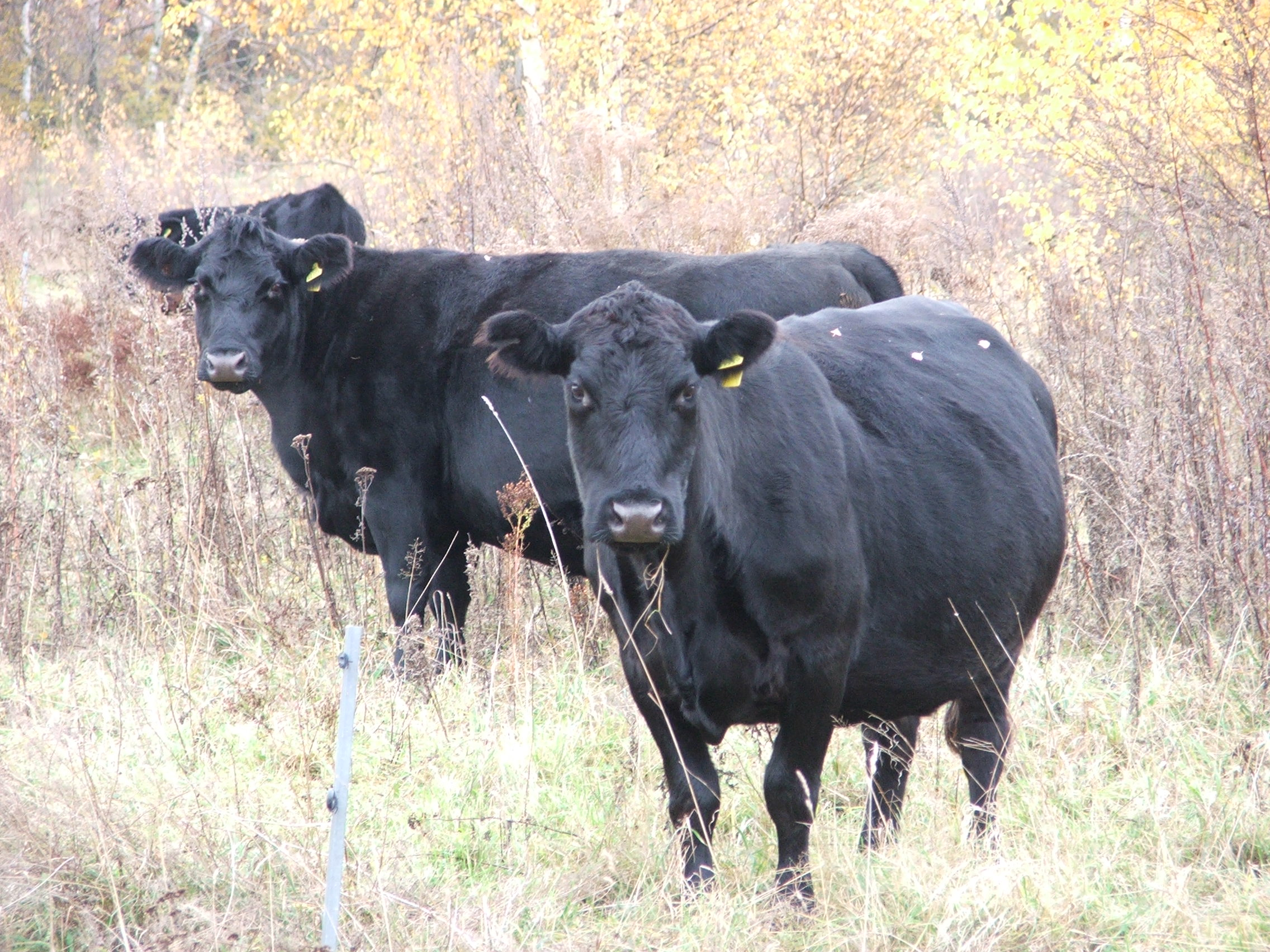
- Cows
- Conservation status: FAO (2007): not at risk
- Other names: German: Deutsch Angus
- Country of origin: Germany
- Distribution: Germany
- Use: beef; vegetation management

Traits
- Weight: Male: 1000–1200 kg; Female: 550–700 kg
- Height: Male: 135–150 cm; Female: 125–140 cm
- Coat: solid colour: black or red
- Horn status: polled (hornless)
- Cattle; Bos (primigenius) taurus

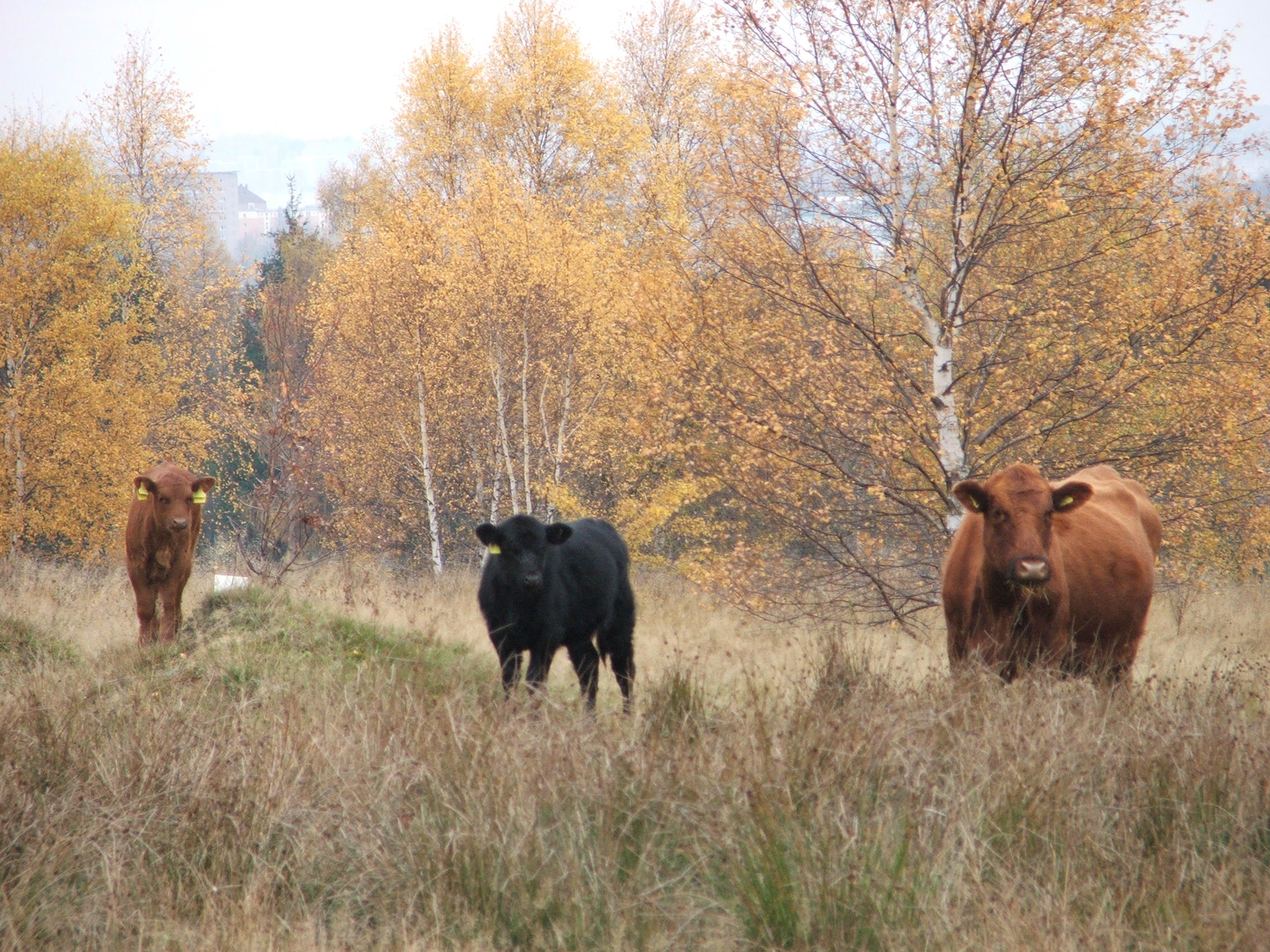
Cow with calves

The German Angus, German: Deutsch Angus, is a modern German breed of beef cattle. It was bred in the 1950s in West Germany by crossing Aberdeen Angus with various native German cattle breeds: the German Black Pied, the Deutsche Rotbunte and the Fleckvieh.

== History ==
The German Angus was bred in West Germany in the 1950s by cross-breeding imported Aberdeen Angus stock from the United Kingdom with local German breeds; these were the German Black Pied or Deutsches Schwarzbuntes Niederungsrind, the Deutsche Rotbunte or Rotbuntes Niederungsrind, and the Fleckvieh or German Simmental. Since 1960 there has been some intromission of the American Angus.

In 1955 a breed society was established, and in 1956 a herd-book was started.

In 2017 the population was recorded as 9603 cows and 454 bulls.

== Characteristics ==
The German Angus is solid-coloured, black, brown or red, and is always naturally polled (hornless). Compared to the Fleckvieh it matures earlier, calves much more easily and has a higher calving rate, while the calf mortality rate is much lower. A comparative study of recently-weaned calves of the two breeds found the German Angus to be more easily handled and more placid. It is larger and leaner than the original Scots Angus.

== Use ==
The German Angus is reared principally for beef. It may also be used in vegetation management.
