= Óengus mac Fergusa =

Óengus mac Fergusa may refer to:

- Óengus I (before 700–761), monarch a/k/a Onuist, anglicised as Angus son of Fergus, who, from 732 to 761, reigned as king of Pictland, also referenced as Pictavia, located in northeastern region of land later unified as Scotland
- Óengus II (before 780–834), king of Picts, a/k/a Onuist, Hungus or Angus, from 820 until 834, traditionally associated with cult of Saint Andrew and flag of Scotland; included in Duan Albanach's praise poem from reign of Máel Coluim

== See also ==
- Óengus, referenced as Aengus
- Angus (disambiguation)
