= George Grant (settler) =

Scottish settler in Kansas

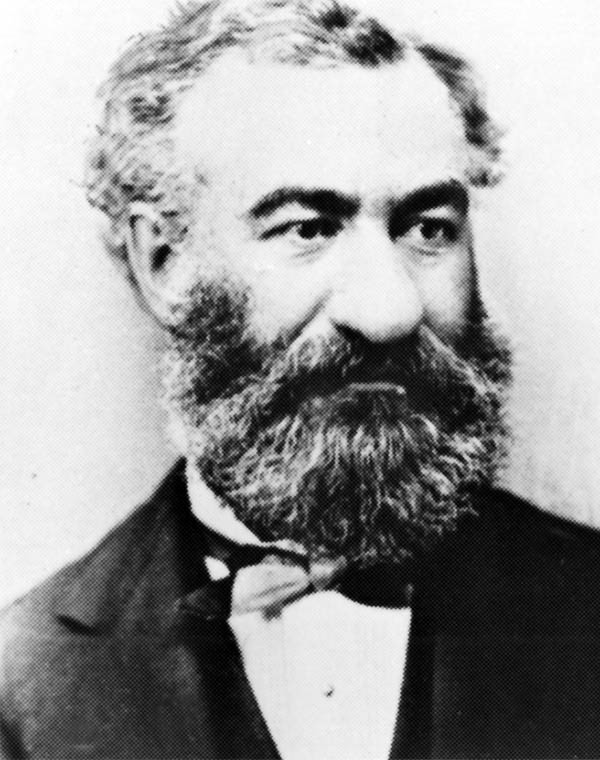
Grant at an unknown time

George Grant (1822, Banffshire – 26 April 1878) was a Scottish cloth merchant who founded the town of Victoria, Kansas, which he populated with members of the English gentry. Although his project in Victoria was mostly unsuccessful, with most settlers leaving after Grant's death, the bulls he brought from Scotland sired the popular American Angus breed.

== Founding Victoria ==
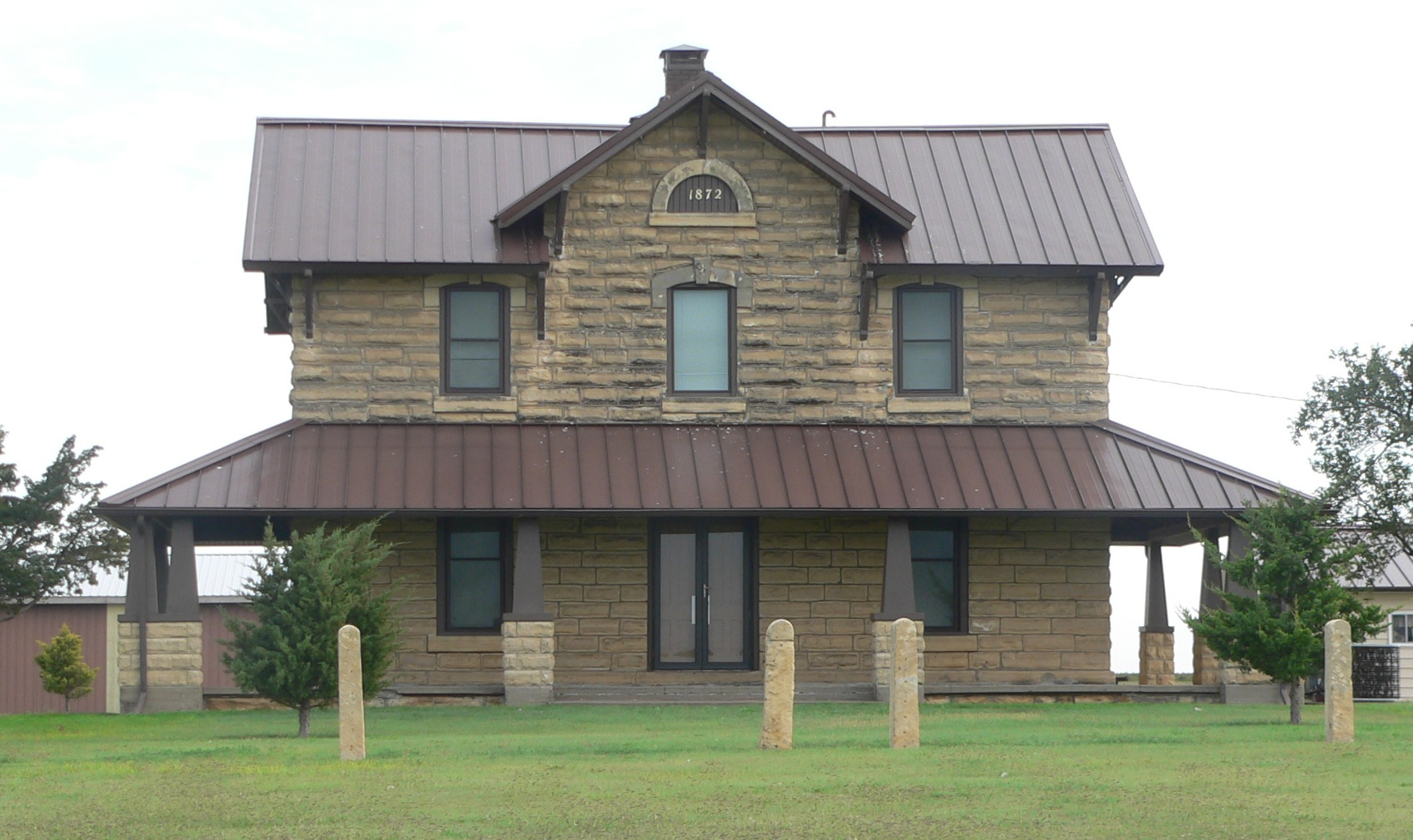
The George Grant Villa, seen from the north

George Grant was working as a cloth merchant in London when, upon hearing that Prince Albert was sick, he bought as much black crepe as he could, in anticipation of the popularity of mourning fashion. He made an enormous fortune from this endeavor and sought to retire in the early 1870s but found no estate in England to his liking. Upon a tour of America in 1872, he decided that the ideal location would be Kansas, taking especial note of opportunities for herds of sheep.

Grant negotiated a deal with Union Pacific involving an enormous parcel of their land which was to be given to him involving him finding settlers for the area, and Union Pacific building his town for him. The parcel of land was variously reported as being between 40,000 acres to in excess of 200,000 acres. Although almost certainly false, the upper estimates would have made him the single largest individual land owner in the United States. The railroad built a grocery, a hotel, and a post office.

38 settlers left from Glasgow aboard the steamship Alabama in 1873. They docked first in New Orleans, where their cargo, including four Aberdeen Angus bulls, was sent by rail to Kansas. The settlers got off at St. Louis. The settlers were mostly sons of the gentry, remittance men, or sons of the gentry who were sent away to build their character. It was Grant's intention that the town of Victoria, named for Queen Victoria, would continue to grow, and come to contain farms, ranches, and many homes. Grant settled into the George Grant Villa designed by a London architect and kept the largest herd in the area, at around 700 cattle and over 6,000 sheep. Poor weather, including locusts, fires, winter, and disease affected the viability of the project. Settlers preferred games over work and founded a hunt club and a cricket club.

Grant briefly showed off his cattle in 1873 at the Kansas City Livestock Exhibition as well as the Great Centennial Show in Philadelphia in 1876. In Kansas City, the black polled bulls were seen as freaks.

== Death and legacy ==
Grant died on 26 April 1878. His funeral was held at the St. George Episcopal Church in Victoria as its first service. He was buried at a Presbyterian church. After his death, his cattle stock was sold. His Angus cattle quickly became popular for being a hardy breed. Many of his settlers dispersed to Hays, England, the Eastern United States, and South America. The church he was buried at moved to Hays years later. The site of his burial was given a limestone pyramid in 1943, and in 1973 a statue of an American Angus was placed atop it. He was inducted to the Hall of Great Westerners in 1961.
