= Amerifax =

Breed of cattle

Amerifax is a breed of beef cattle, developed in the US in the 1970s. This breed is a combination of American Angus (5/8th) and Beef Friesian (3/8th).
