= Justus Bissing Jr. Historic District =

Historic district in Kansas, United States

- U.S. National Register of Historic Places
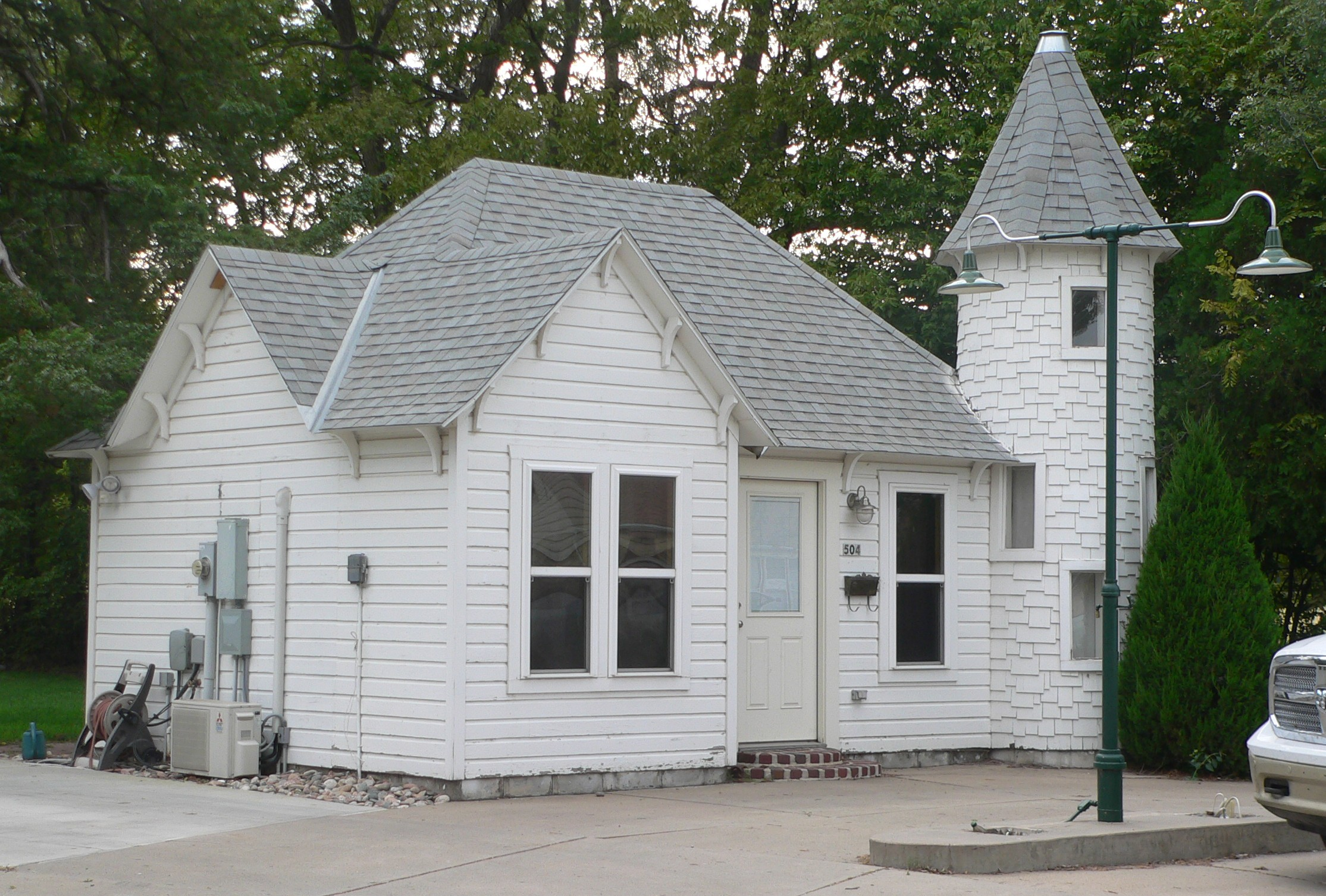
- Tower Service station (c.1932), in 2014

- Location within Kansas Location within the United States
- Location: 502-504 W. 12th St., Hays, Kansas
- Coordinates: 38.8753°N 99.3369°W
- Area: less than one acre
- Built: 1920, c.1932
- Built by: Justus Bissing, Jr.
- Architectural style: Bungalow/craftsman
- NRHP reference No.: 03001495
- Added to NRHP: January 28, 2004

The Justus Bissing Jr. Historic District, in Hays, Kansas in Ellis County, Kansas, was listed on the National Register of Historic Places in 2004.

The district includes two contributing buildings:

- the 1920 Justus Bissing Jr. house, Craftsman in style with Prairie School influences, and
- the c. 1932 Tower Service station, built in a house-type plan with elements of Queen Anne style,

both built by Justus Bissing Jr. Mr. Bissing was of a Volga German family which came to Ellis County in 1874, and grew up on a farm north of Catharine, Kansas, which is near Hays.

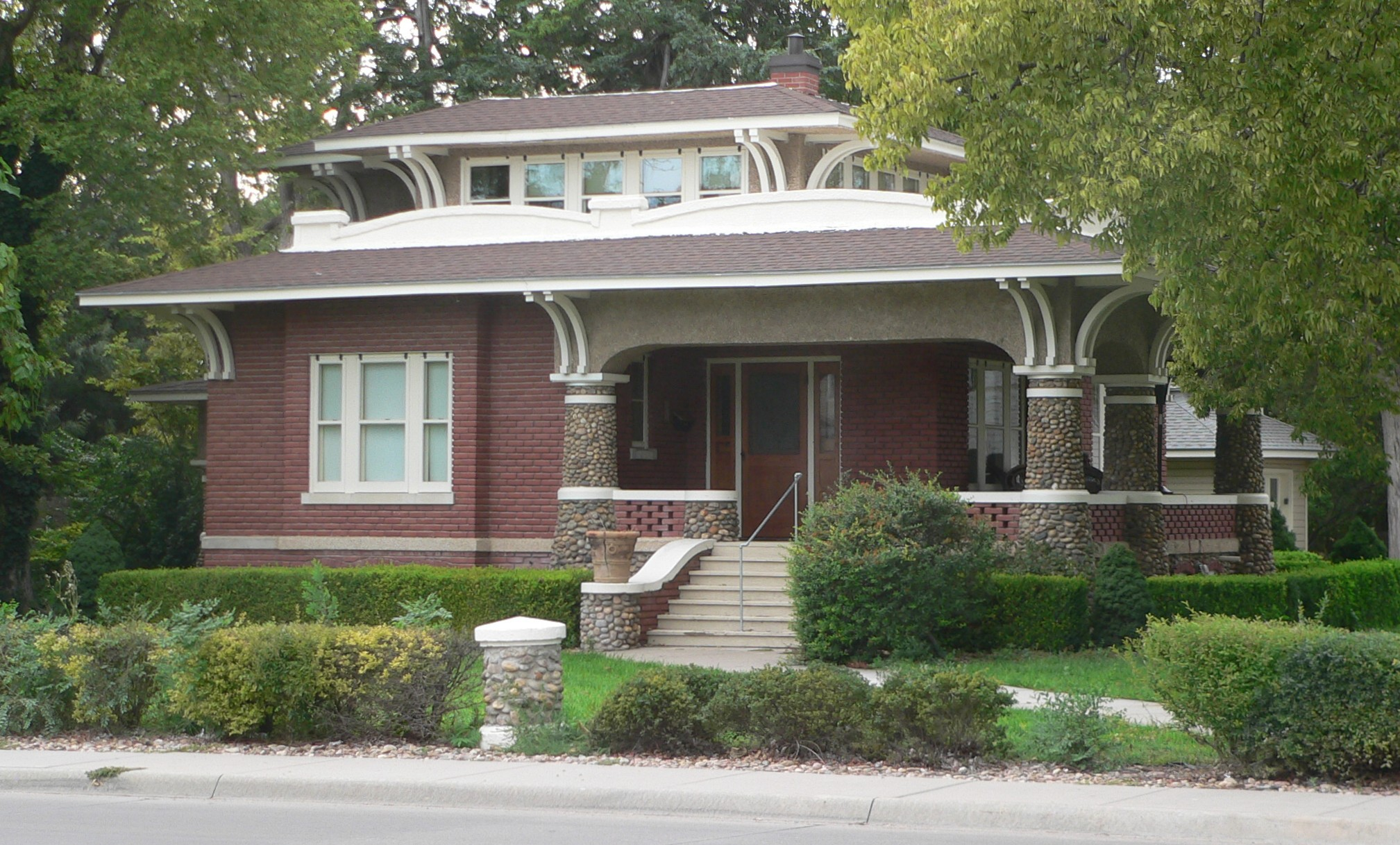
Justus Bissing Jr. House (1920), in 2014

While the corner of Elm Street and West 12th Street would be a more natural location for a gas station, the stately Craftsman home was built by Justus Bissing Jr. at the corner first, in 1920, built of brick and stone and relatively unmovable. So when the "craftsman, inventor and entrepreneur" chose to build a gas station for his son to operate, on the property, that was placed adjacent, fronting only on West 12th Street. The property was deemed to be significant for National Register listing for its architecture, reflecting "meticulous artistry" in both the interior and exterior of the two-story home.

The gas station is the last surviving of several which were built along West 12th.

Also in Hays, at 117 W. 13th, there is a Bissing House bed and breakfast, in another home built by Bissing, built in 1909. It was previously The Inn at 117 and the Tea Rose Inn.
