= Onuist =

Onuist or Ungus may refer to:

- Óengus I of the Picts (d. 761), king of the Picts 732–761
- Óengus II of the Picts (d. 834), king of the Picts c. 820–834

== See also ==
- Angus (disambiguation)
