= George Grant Villa =

Historic house in Ellis County, Kansas

- U.S. National Register of Historic Places
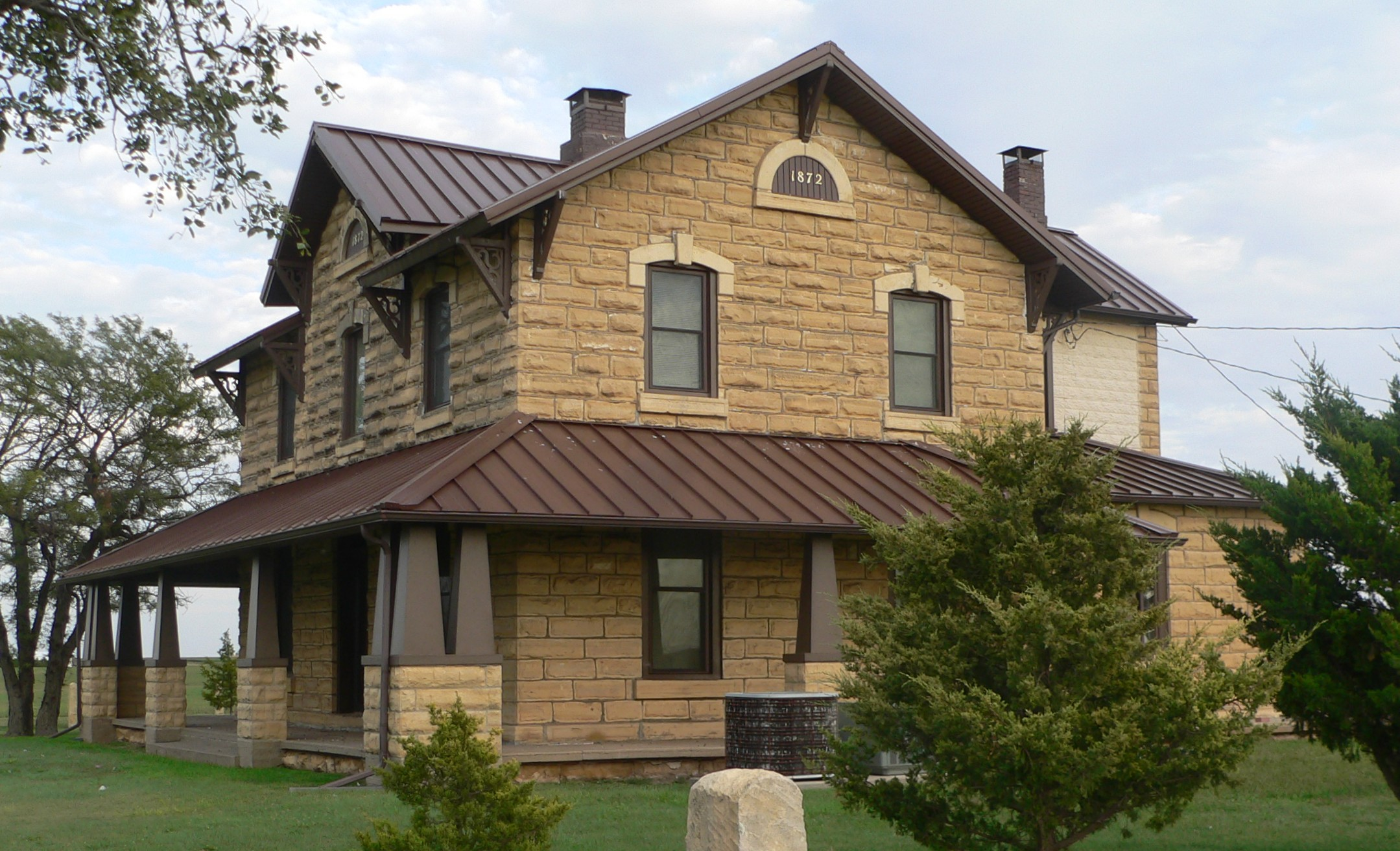
- Seen from the west northwest

- Location within Kansas Location within the United States
- Coordinates: 38.7681°N 99.1196°W
- Built: 1873
- Architect: Robert William Edis
- NRHP reference No.: 72000496

The George Grant Villa is a building outside of Victoria, Kansas, which was the home of George Grant, who founded the town. It was built in 1873 as part of his English colonization project there. Grant brought London architect Robert William Edis to design it.

During Grant's lifetime, it was a central meeting point in Victoria among the local settlers. It was built as a fusion of the English country house and the vernacular hewn stone houses seen on the Great Plains. It was designed with steeply pitched gables and broad overhangs to protect from the weather conditions on the plains. It was built, along with the nearby farm buildings, of post rock collected near Big Creek. Grant built the house 5 miles outside of Victoria and died there in 1878.

The interior features a 12 by 22 foot dining room, a study, and an open walnut staircase.

== Gallery ==
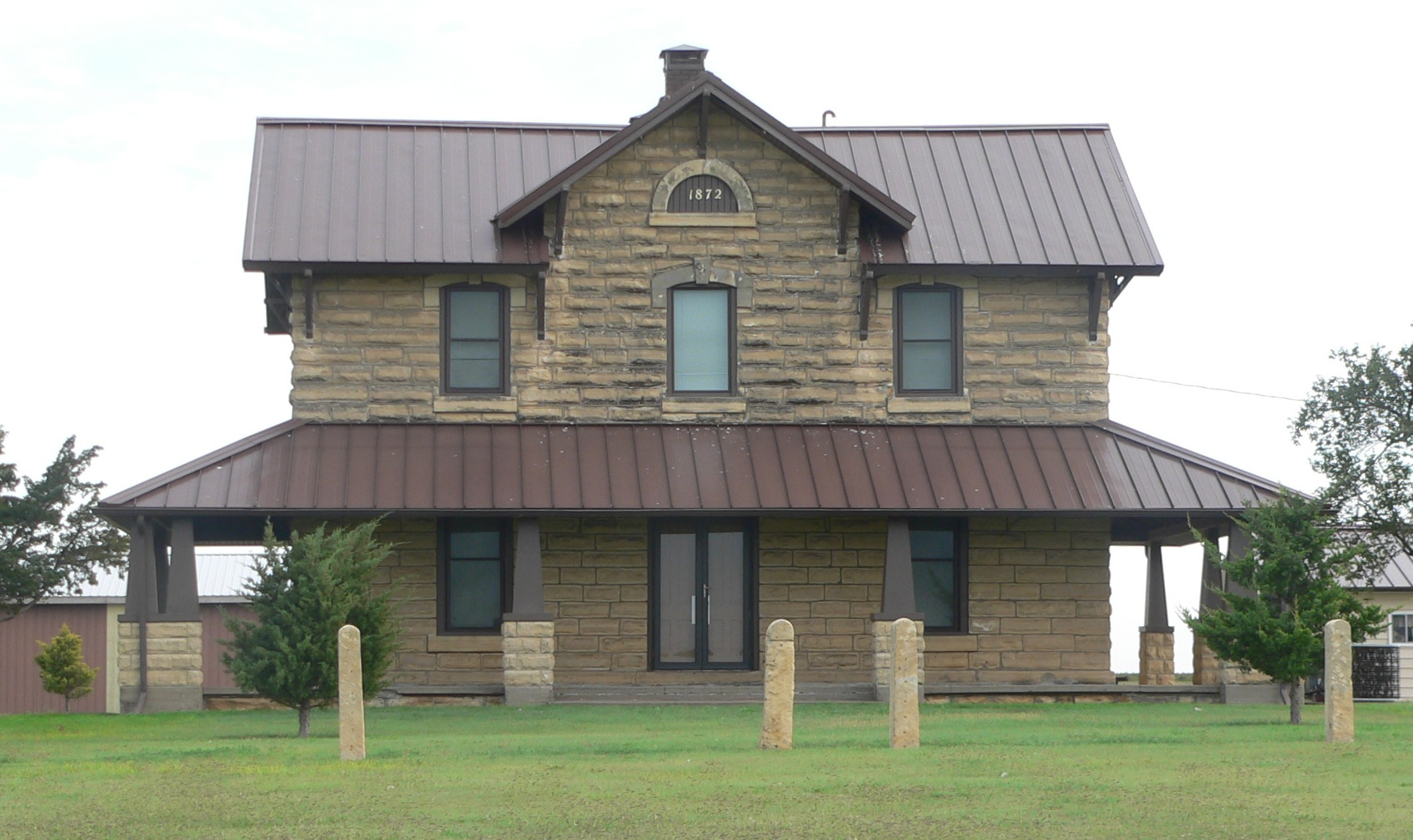
From the north

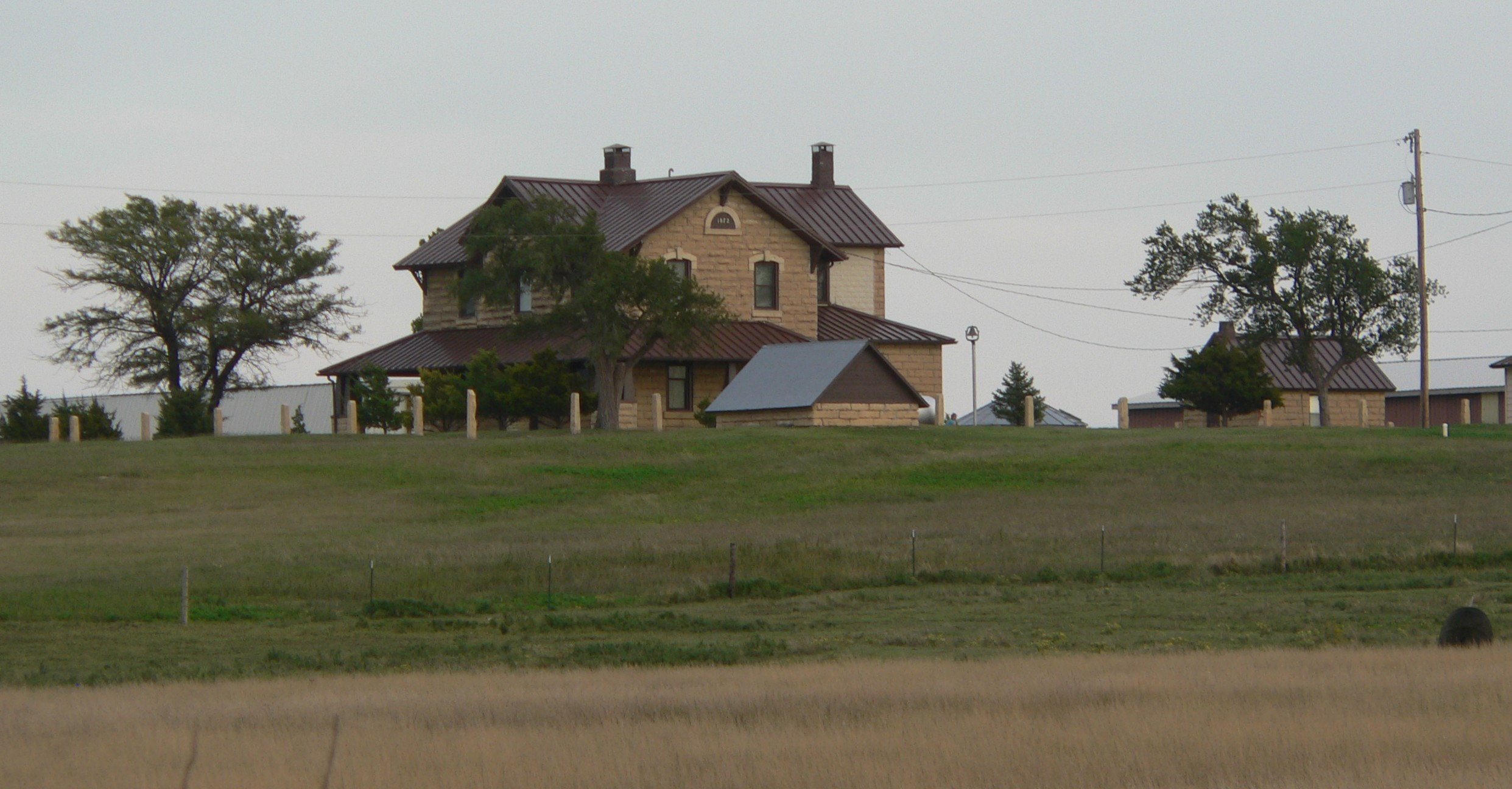
From the northwest
