= Gelbvieh =

German breed of cattle

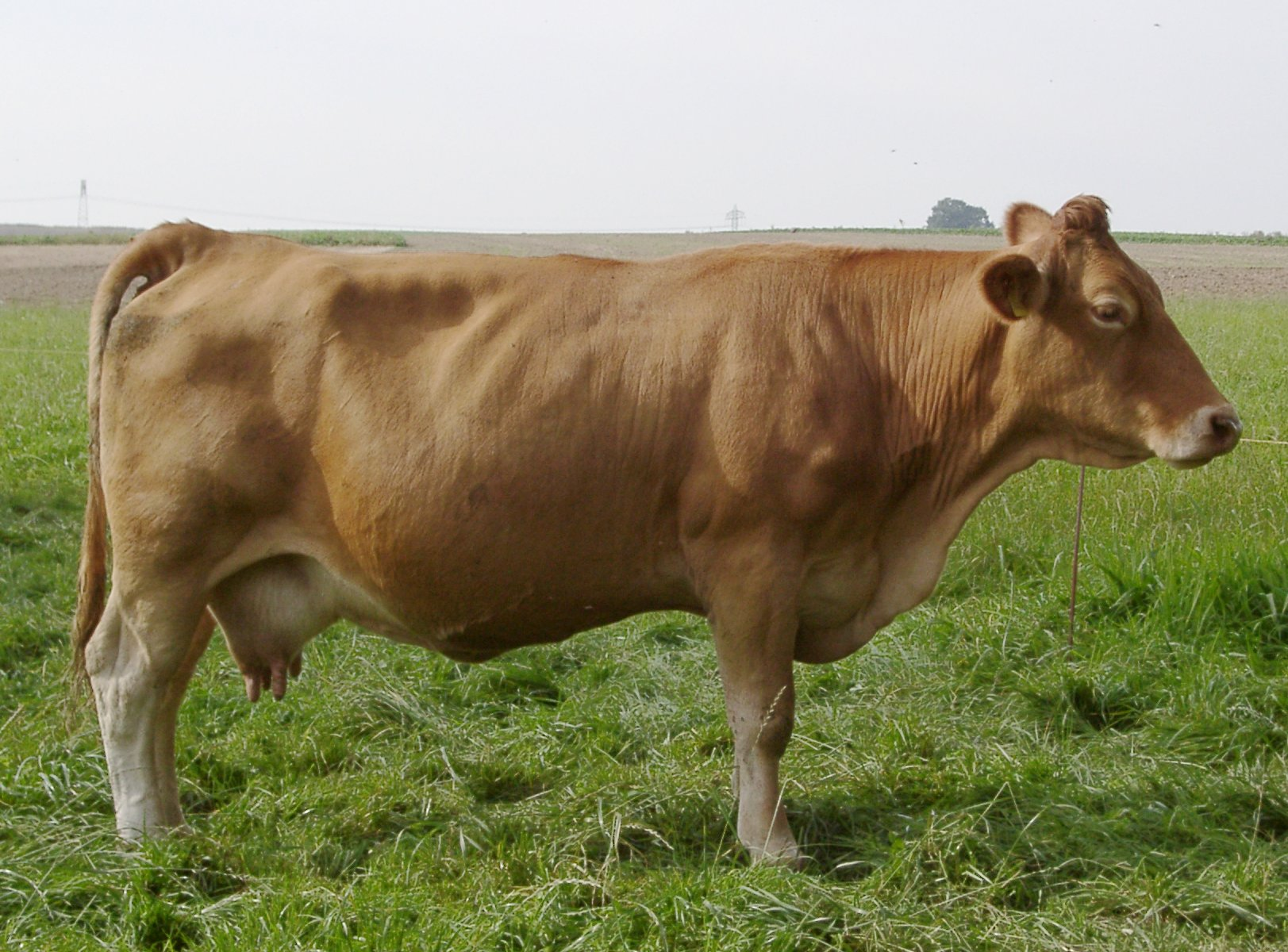
- Conservation status: FAO (2007): not at risk; DAD-IS (2021): endangered-maintained
- Other names: Frankenvieh; Gelbes Frankenvieh; Gelbes Höhenvieh; Gelbvieh Fleischnutzung
- Country of origin: Germany
- Distribution: international
- Use: Gelbvieh: dual-purpose; Gelbvieh Fleischnutzung: beef

Traits
- Weight: Male: average 1200 kg; Female: average 800 kg
- Height: Male: 150–160 cm; Female: 140–145 cm
- Coat: reddish-yellow to cream
- Horn status: sometimes polled
- Cattle; Bos (primigenius) taurus

Gelbvieh (pronounced [ɡɛlbfiː], German for "yellow cattle") is a cattle breed originating in several Franconian districts of Bavaria, Germany in the mid-eighteenth century. It was originally a triple-purpose breed, used for milk, beef and draught power. The modern Gelbvieh is primarily used for beef production.

== History ==
In the mid-nineteenth century, several breeds of local German cattle began to be combined into what would eventually be the Gelbvieh. The new breed was officially formed by 1920.

Between 1998 and 2018 numbers in Germany fell steadily from approximately 10 000 to about 2 000.

Gelbvieh have been introduced to several countries around the world, including Spain, Portugal, Great Britain, Canada, the United States, Australia, and South Africa, primarily through the use of artificial insemination and some live export. The first Gelbvieh genetics reached Canada in 1972 from Germany. Gelbvieh are currently the 6th largest beef breed in Canada with 3500 head registered yearly. The first Gelbvieh cattle were imported to the United States from Germany in 1971 by Leness Hall. The American Gelbvieh Association was formed the same year. There are currently 45,000 registered Gelbvieh cows in the United States. In January 1977, the first American National Gelbvieh Show was held in conjunction with the National Western Stock Show in Denver, Colorado.

== Characteristics ==
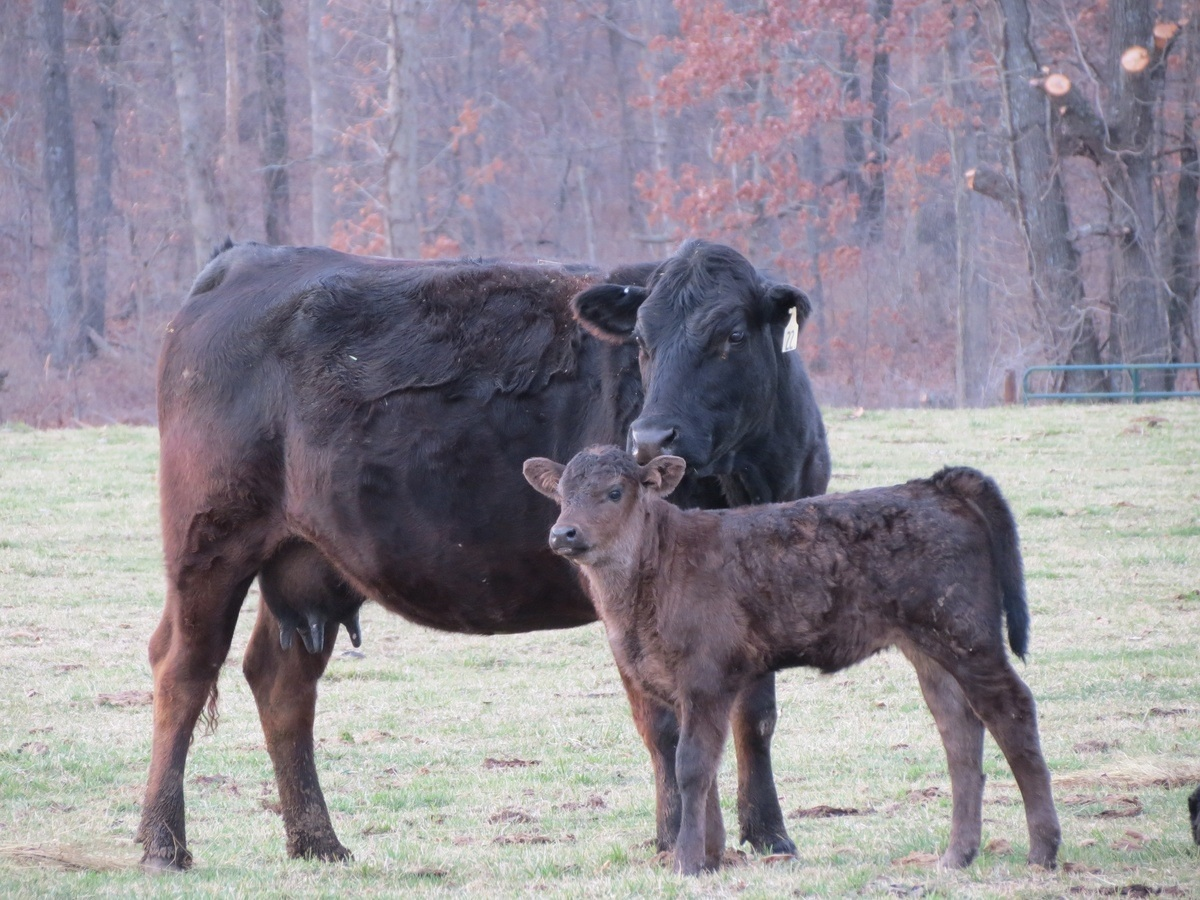
Black Gelbvieh cow and Calf

Gelbvieh literally means "yellow cattle" in German, and the breed originated as golden-brown cattle with dark hooves and full body pigmentation. Through selective breeding, polled and black genetics are now also prevalent in the breed. Gelbvieh cattle are known for their high rate of gain and feed efficiency, and were originally selected for easy growth, quick maturity, length of loin, leanness, docility, and longevity. They are able to adapt to many different rangelands and climate conditions. Gelbvieh females were selected to be very maternal with strong fertility, mothering instincts, good udders, and strong milk production. They are also known to have smaller-bodied offspring, allowing for ease of calving.
