= Acoustically Navigated Geological Underwater Survey =

Unmanned research vehicle

The Acoustically Navigated Geological Underwater System (ANGUS) was a deep-towed still-camera sled operated by the Woods Hole Oceanographic Institute (WHOI) in the early 1970s. It was the first unmanned research vehicle made by WHOI. ANGUS was encased in a large 12-foot (3.7 m) steel frame designed to explore rugged volcanic terrain and able to withstand high impact collisions. It was fitted with three 35 mm color cameras with 400 feet (120 m) of film. Together, its three cameras were able to photograph a strip of the sea floor with a width up to 200 feet (61 m). Each camera was equipped with strobe lights allowing them to photograph the ocean floor from 35 to 50 feet (11 to 15 m) above. On the bottom of the body was a downward-facing sonar system to monitor the sled's height above the ocean floor. It was capable of working in depths up to 20,000 feet (6,100 m) and could therefore reach roughly 98% of the sea floor. ANGUS could remain in the deep ocean for work sessions of 12 to 14 hours at a time, taking up to 16,000 photographs in one session. ANGUS was often used to scout locations of interest to later be explored and sampled by other vehicles such as Argo or Alvin.

ANGUS has been used to search for and photograph underground geysers and the creatures living near them, and it was equipped with a heat sensor to alert the tether-ship when it passed over one. It was used on expeditions such as Project FAMOUS (French-American Mid Ocean Undersea Study 1973–1974), the Discovery expedition with Argo to survey the wreckage of the Titanic. (1985), and again in the return mission to the Titanic (1986). ANGUS was the only ROV used on both dives to the Titanic.

On Project FAMOUS, ANGUS helped change scientists' views of the ocean floor. It showed them how different geological formations and chemical compositions of sediments can be, disproving previous assumptions of ocean floor uniformity The project also provided new insight to the theory of seafloor spreading by observing and sampling the rock formations around ridges and the horizontal formation of layers parallel to the ridge.

In another 1977 expedition with ANGUS, scientists monitored temperatures over the ocean floor for any fluctuation. It was not until late at night the crew noticed temperatures rise drastically. They would review the photographic footage taken after the vehicle's session. ANGUS provided the first photographic evidence for hydrothermal vents and black smokers. It had returned with over 3000 colored photos showing both vents as well as colonies of clams and other organisms. They would later return with Alvin to take samples.

Scientists nicknamed ANGUS Dope on a rope due to its durability and lack of fragile sensors. It was also given the motto "takes a lickin' but it keeps on clickin'". ANGUS was retired in the late 1980s, having completed over 250 voyages.
