= American Angus =

American breed of beef cattle

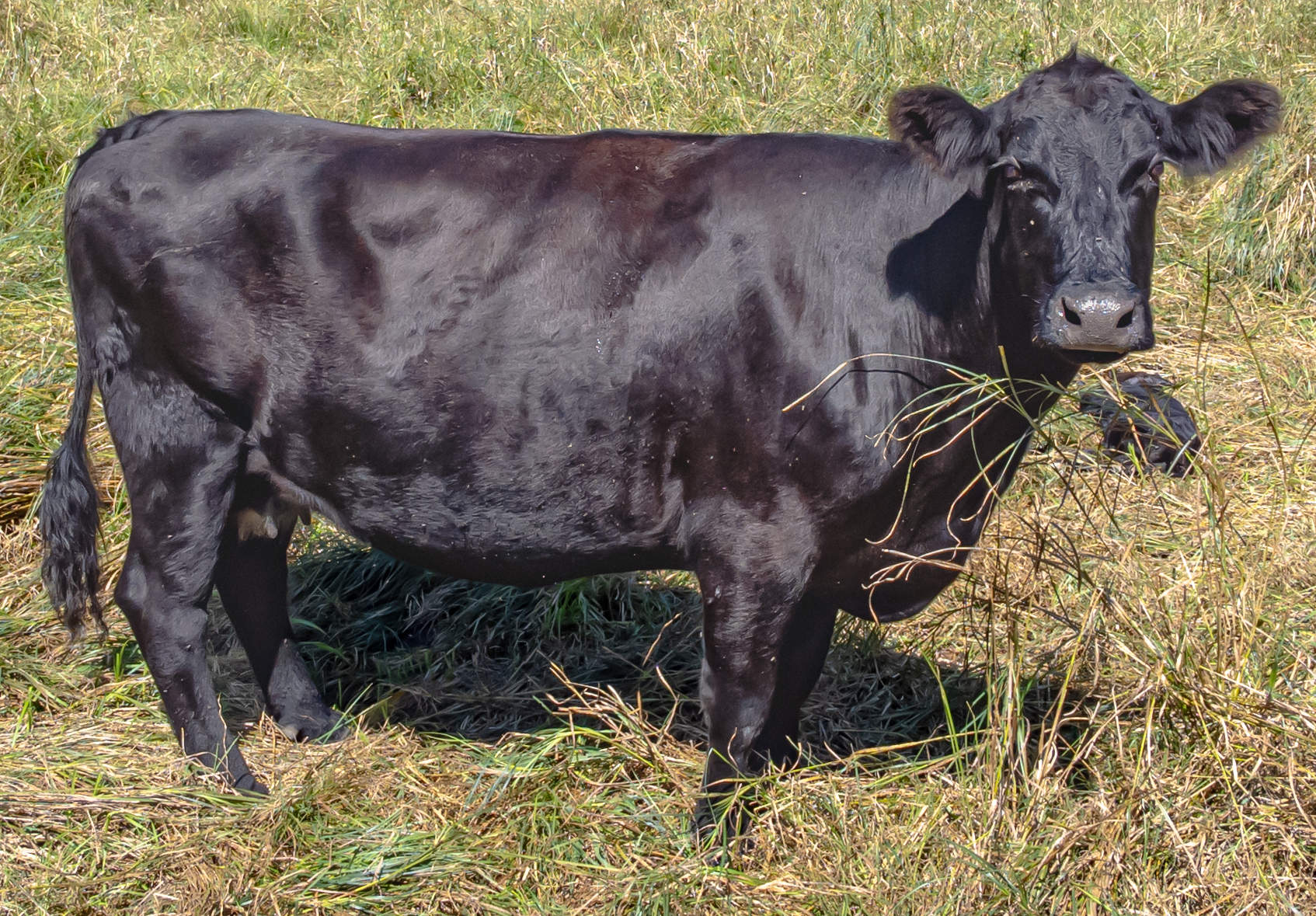
- Conservation status: DAD-IS (2021): not at risk
- Other names: Black Angus
- Country of origin: United States
- Distribution: all 50 states
- Use: beef

Traits
- Weight: Male: 748 kg; Female: 638 kg
- Coat: black
- Horn status: polled
- Cattle; Bos (primigenius) taurus

The American Angus is an American breed of beef cattle. It derives from the Scottish Aberdeen Angus population, but may only be black; red-coated individuals may not be registered with the American Angus Association, but can be registered as Red Angus.

== History ==
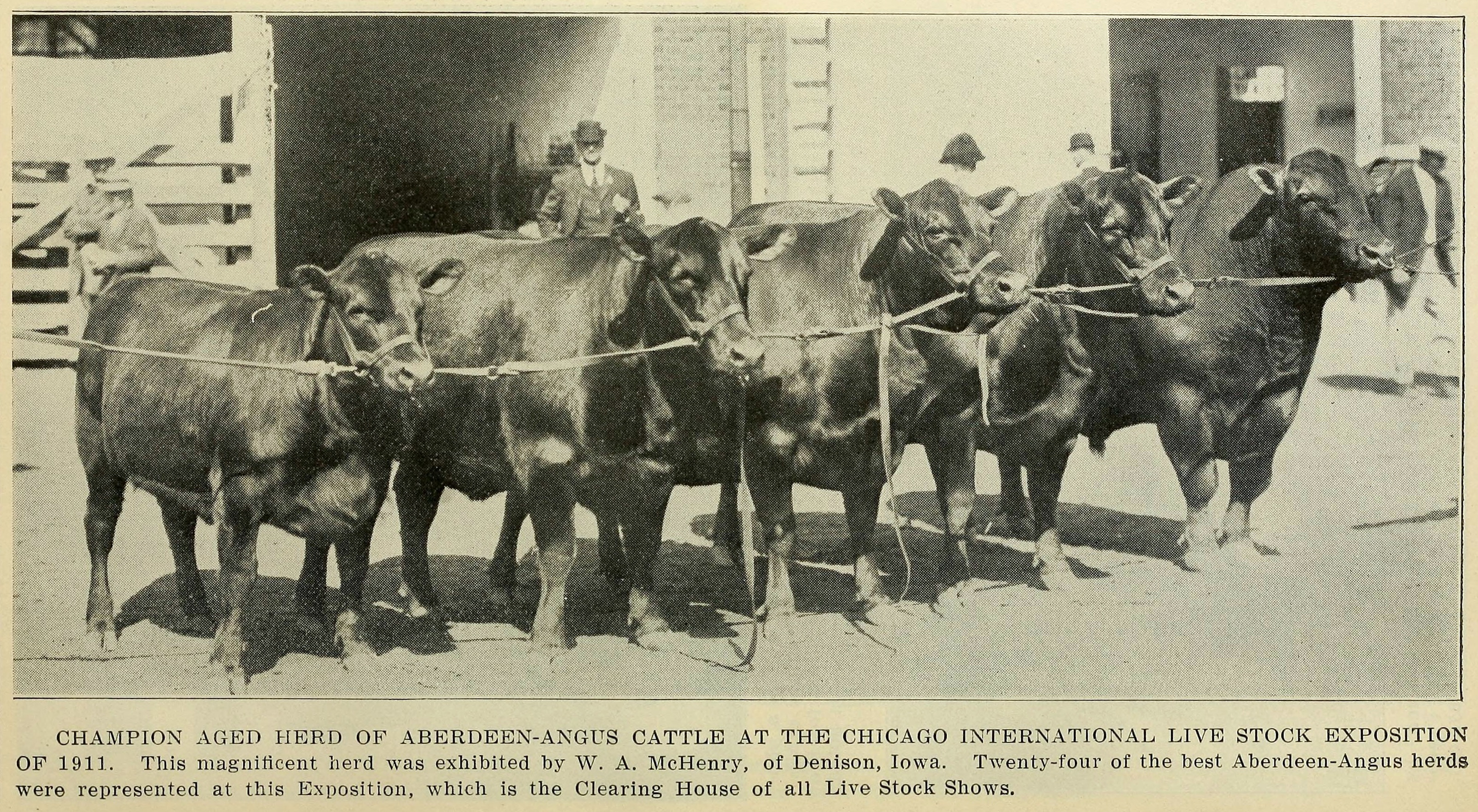
Champion group at the Chicago International Live Stock Exposition, 1911

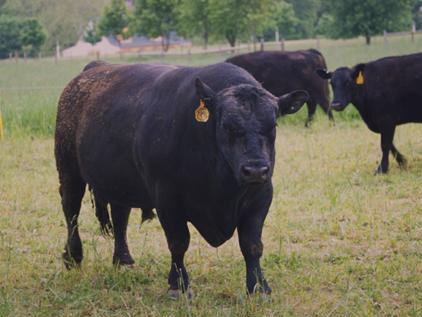
Bull and heifers in Maryland

Some stock of the Scottish Aberdeen Angus breed was exported to Montreal, Canada, in about 1859, but nothing more is known of it. The earliest import to the United States was in 1873, when a Scottish landowner named George Grant brought some to his settlement at Victoria, Kansas, where they were cross-bred with his Texas Longhorn stock. Further imports to the United States of some 1200 head were made from 1878 to 1883. In that year a breed association, the American Aberdeen-Angus Breeders' Association, was established with 60 members in Chicago, Illinois; the name was shortened to American Angus Association in the 1950s.

Until 1917 both black and red cattle could be registered in the herdbook of the association. Thereafter, red-coated individuals were barred from registration; since 1954 they have been registered by the Red Angus Association of America as Red Angus.

The American Angus population in 2010 numbered about 320000 head, with almost 300000 breeding cows and over 22000 registered bulls, making it the most numerous beef breed of the United States. In 2021 the conservation status of the breed was reported to DAD-IS as "not at risk".

== Use ==
The American Angus is a beef breed, and is reared only for that purpose. Comparative trials have not identified any commercially-significant difference between it and the Red Angus. Since 1978, beef meeting certain criteria may be marketed as "Certified Angus Beef", a quality mark of the American Angus Association; provenance from purebred American Angus cattle is not a requirement.

Bulls have been used as sires for crossbreeding; the cross with Herefords gives rise to the Black Baldy, which displays hybrid vigor and the dominant characteristics of both breeds – it is polled, with a black coat and white face. The American Angus has contributed to the creation of various hybrid breeds including the Amerifax.
