= Red Angus =

International breed of beef cattle

- Cow and calf

- Cow and calf in Oregon
- Conservation status: FAO 2007: not at risk
- Other names: Angus Rojo; Rdeci Angus
- Country of origin: Australia; United States
- Distribution: Australia; Canada; Cuba; Ecuador; Panama; Peru; Slovenia; United States
- Use: beef

Traits
- Weight: Male: 900 kg; Female: 635 kg
- Coat: red
- Horn status: polled
- Cattle; Bos (primigenius) taurus

Cow in Gloucester

The Red Angus is an international breed of beef cattle characterised by a reddish-brown coat colour. It derives from the Scottish Aberdeen Angus population and is identical to it in all but coat colour. Red Angus are registered separately from black Angus cattle in Australia, Canada, and the United States.

== History ==
The Scottish Aberdeen Angus is usually black, but red individuals occur; this may be the consequence of cross-breeding in the eighteenth century of the small Scottish cattle with larger English Longhorn stock, aimed at increasing their draught power.

In 1890 there were 22 red-coated cattle among the 2700 head registered in the herd-book of the American Angus Association. From 1917 these red individuals could no longer be registered; some were exported to Brazil from about 1936. In the 1940s there were two herds in Texas; one was dispersed and the other was exported to Argentina.

From about 1945, further herds consisting only of red-coated stock were formed. In 1954 a breeders' association, the Red Angus Association of America, was established at a meeting in Fort Worth, Texas. The registered population in 2008 numbered about 47000 head, making it the fifth beef breed by number in the United States; American Angus, Charolais, Hereford and Simmental were more numerous.

In Australia, breeders of the red variant proposed a scheme for registration of their stock with the Angus Society of Australia; it was not accepted, and in 1970 they formed the Red Angus Society of Australia.

The Red Angus is reported to DAD-IS by Australia, Cuba, Ecuador, Panama, Peru, Slovenia and the United States; its global conservation status is "not at risk".

== Use ==
The Red Angus is a beef breed, and is reared only for that purpose. Comparative trials have not identified any difference of commercial significance between it and the American Angus. Bulls have been used as sires for cross-breeding. The Red Angus is a parent breed to the Regus (cross-breeding with Hereford) and to the RX3 (a mixture of Hereford, Red Angus and Red Holstein).
