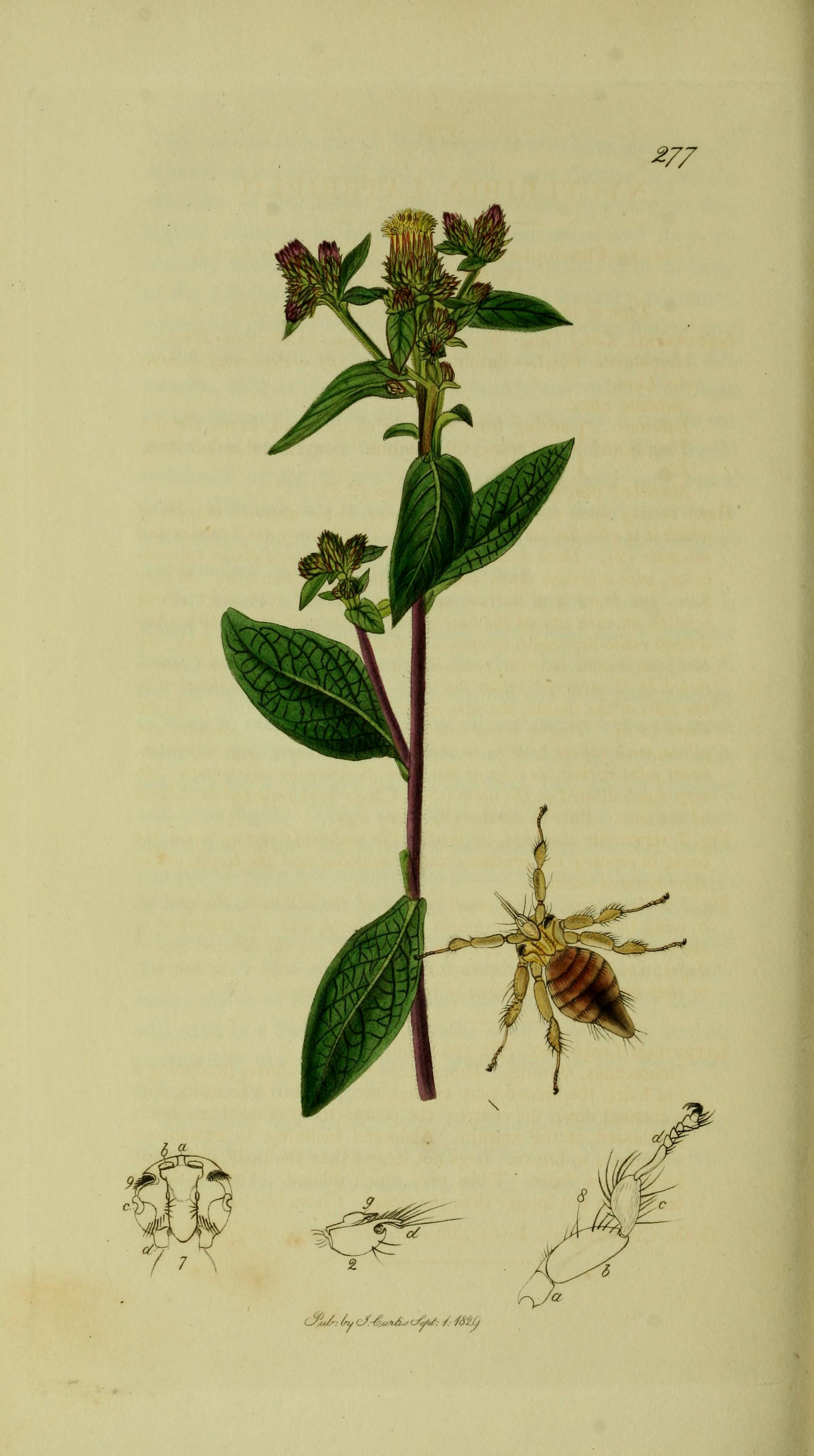
- Nycteribia kolenatii in British Entomology

Scientific classification
- Kingdom: Animalia
- Phylum: Arthropoda
- Class: Insecta
- Order: Diptera
- Family: Nycteribiidae
- Genus: Nycteribia
- Species: N. kolenatii

Binomial name
- Nycteribia kolenatii Theodor & Moscona, 1954

Synonyms
- Nycteribia latreilli Curtis, 1829; Listropodia blasii Kolenati, 1863; Nycteribia latreillii Westwood, 1835

= Nycteribia kolenatii =

Species of fly

Nycteribia kolenatii is a species of fly in the family Nycteribiidae. It is found in the Palearctic.
