= Basilia fletcheri =

Scientific classification
- Kingdom: Animalia
- Phylum: Arthropoda
- Class: Insecta
- Order: Diptera
- Family: Nycteribiidae
- Subfamily: Nycteribiinae
- Genus: Basilia
- Species: B. fletcheri

Binomial name
- Basilia fletcheri (Scott, 1914)

Synonyms
- Penicillidia fletcheri Scott, 1914

Species of fly

Basilia fletcheri is parasitic bat fly in the family Hippoboscidae or alternatively, family Nycteribiidae. It is found in India.

== Taxonomic history ==
Hugh Scott described this species in 1914. He named it after its collector, Thomas Bainbrigge Fletcher. Two specimens, a male and a female, were discovered on a Dormer's bat in Tamil Nadu, India. Scott placed this species in the genus Penicillidia Kolenati, 1863. In 1956, Oskar Theodor classified it as belonging to the Basilia Miranda-Ribeiro, 1903 genus, which is in the same subfamily as Penicillidia.

== Range ==
It was discovered in Chennai. Scott later reported that Joseph Charles Bequaert sent him a specimen from Bengaluru, which Scott identified as this species, but Theodor later wrote this specimen was in fact B. punctuata; other places specimens have been collected include Navapur and Mumbai.

== Hosts ==
Hosts which specimens have been collected from include Dormer's bats (Scotozous dormeri) and lesser bamboo bats (Tylonycteris pachypus).

== Description ==
It is about 2.5 mm long and has a yellowish color.
