= John Hare (conservationist) =

British conservationist (1934–2022)

John Hare OBE FRGS
- Born: John Neville Hare; 11 December 1934; Bexhill-on-Sea, East Sussex, England
- Died: 28 January 2022 (aged 87)
- Occupations: Explorer, author and conservationist
- Writing career
- Pen name: Dan Fulani
- Website: www.johnhare.org.uk

John Neville Hare OBE FRGS (11 December 1934 – 28 January 2022) was a British explorer, author, and conservationist, known for campaigning for the preservation of the Wild Bactrian camel.

== Life and career ==
Hare was born in Bexhill, East Sussex, on 11 December 1934. His interest in wildlife conservation began when he served in the north of colonial Nigeria, first as an army officer assigned to the Royal West African Frontier Force and later in the Colonial Service.

In 1993, John Hare was offered by a Russian exploration team to research the status of the wild Bactrian camel in Mongolia, a critically endangered species of camel. It only survives in the Gobi Desert. In 1994, he presented his findings at an international conference in Ulan-Bator.

in 1995, he received permission to enter Lop Nur, the first foreigner to get such permission in 45 years. Lop Nur was also the natural habitat of the wild Bactrian camel and also a former nuclear testing site. The wild Bactrian camels are also able to tolerate salt water with a higher salt content than sea water, explaining their residence in Lop Nur. He undertook expeditions in 1995, 1996, 1997 and 1999 to Lop Nur. In 1995, he became the first foreigner in recorded history to cross the Gashun Gobi Desert from north to south.

In 1997, Hare with Kathryn Rae founded the Wild Camel Protection Foundation, a UK registered charity. The foundation proposed the establishment of the Lop Nur Wild Camel National Nature Reserve in Xinjiang Province in the former nuclear test site, to which the Chinese government later agreed. The WCPF became responsible for helping the Chinese to establish one of the largest nature reserves in the world, protecting not only the wild Bactrian camel but many other IUCN Red Book listed endangered fauna and flora. Hare was the sole international consultant for the Reserve.

Between 2001 and 2002, Hare crossed the Sahara Desert from Lake Chad to Tripoli, a journey of 1500 miles, which lasted 3.5 months, to raise awareness for the wild camel. This route had not been followed in its entirety by a foreigner for 100 years. This journey was undertaken to raise funding and awareness of the plight of the wild camel.

In 2006, Hare made the first recorded complete circling by camel of Lake Turkana (Rudolf), in Kenya. This involved swimming 22 camels across River Omo in Ethiopia.

In 2005 and 2006, he made two more expeditions into the Chinese and Mongolian Gobi deserts, on domestic Bactrian camels. In 2004, the WCPF established the Hunter Hall Captive Wild Camel Breeding Centre at Zakhyn Us in Mongolia, housing 12 wild camels, which had been rescued from being captured by Mongolian herdsmen. This is the only place in the world where the wild camel is held in captivity apart from two zoos in China. By 2010, the population had increased to 25. The Veterinary University of Vienna published a paper after five years of genetic tests on samples from these camels, stating that they were of a previously unknown species of camel that had separated from any other known form of camel over 700,000 years ago and was different from the Bactrian camel. The findings of this paper were accepted by the International Union for the Conservation of Nature which listed the wild camel (Camelus ferus) as critically endangered.

In 2013 and 2015, two successful translocations of wild camels were made from the Mongolian Wild camel Breeding Centre into the Gobi Desert.

Hare was also the author of various books, such as The Fearless Four series and various books relating to his travels in the Gobi and the Sahara. His published works include The Lost Camels of Tartary (1998), Shadows Across the Sahara (2003), Mysteries of the Gobi (2009), Last Man In (2013), and 38 other titles.

Hare died on 28 January 2022, at the age of 87.

== Dan Fulani ==
Dan Fulani was a pseudonym for John Hare, allowing him to identify as a Nigerian fiction writer. As Fulani, he published 16 books since 1981, some of which try to highlight development issues through popular fiction.

His first published works told the adventures of a young northern Nigerian boy called Sauna and the Sauna stories spread throughout Africa and were in high demand as readers in Southern and East African schools. He later wrote on more contentious themes in particular, The Price of Liberty, which told the story of a pesticide, banned in the US, being dumped on Africa. Other themes included a campaign against milk powder, The Fight for Life, and drugs, Sauna and the Drug Pedlars. His books have been published by many of the UK's leading publishers including Macmillan, Hodder and Stoughton, Longman and Nelson and also in Nigeria by Bounty Press and Safari. The Sauna series featured in a northern Nigeria television series.

== Awards ==
- 1998: An Environmental Award from the State Environment Protection Agency of China for great contribution to saving the critically endangered wild camel from extinction.
- 2004: The Ness Award of the Royal Geographical Society for raising public awareness and conservation of endangered wild camels in Mongolia and China. In the same year. the Royal Society of Asian Affairs awarded him the Lawrence of Arabia Memorial Medal for exploration under extreme hazard.
- 2006: Awarded the Mungo Park Medal by the Royal Scottish Geographical Society for distinguished contributions to exploration.
- 2009: Appointed the sole International Consultant to the Lop Nur Wild Camel National Nature Reserve.
- 2010: Awarded the Lowell Thomas Award by the Explorers Club of America for his dedication to protecting the critically endangered wild camel.
- 2014: Awarded the Mongolian Environmental Protection Medal for outstanding contributions to wild camel protection from the Mongolian Ministry of Nature and the Environment.
- 2016: Awarded the Mongolian Government's Friendship Medal – their highest award given to foreigners.
- 2017: Awarded the OBE in the Birthday Honours for services to the conservation of the wild camel in Mongolia and China.
