= Basilia boardmani =

Scientific classification
- Kingdom: Animalia
- Phylum: Arthropoda
- Class: Insecta
- Order: Diptera
- Family: Nycteribiidae
- Genus: Basilia
- Species: B. boardmani

Binomial name
- Basilia boardmani Rozeboom, 1934

Species of fly

Basilia boardmani, the southeastern myotis bat fly, is a species of fly in the family Nycteribiidae. The insect is parasitic, and lives by taking blood meals from its host, a species of bat. It differs from all other Basilia species by the presence of a finger-like process on the metanotum of the female (behind thoracic membrane).
