= The Fearless Four =

The Fearless Four may refer to:

- The Fearless Four (group), an American old school hip-hop group
- The Fearless Four (film), a 1997 animated film
- The Fearless Four, a children's book series by John Hare
