= List of animals with humps =

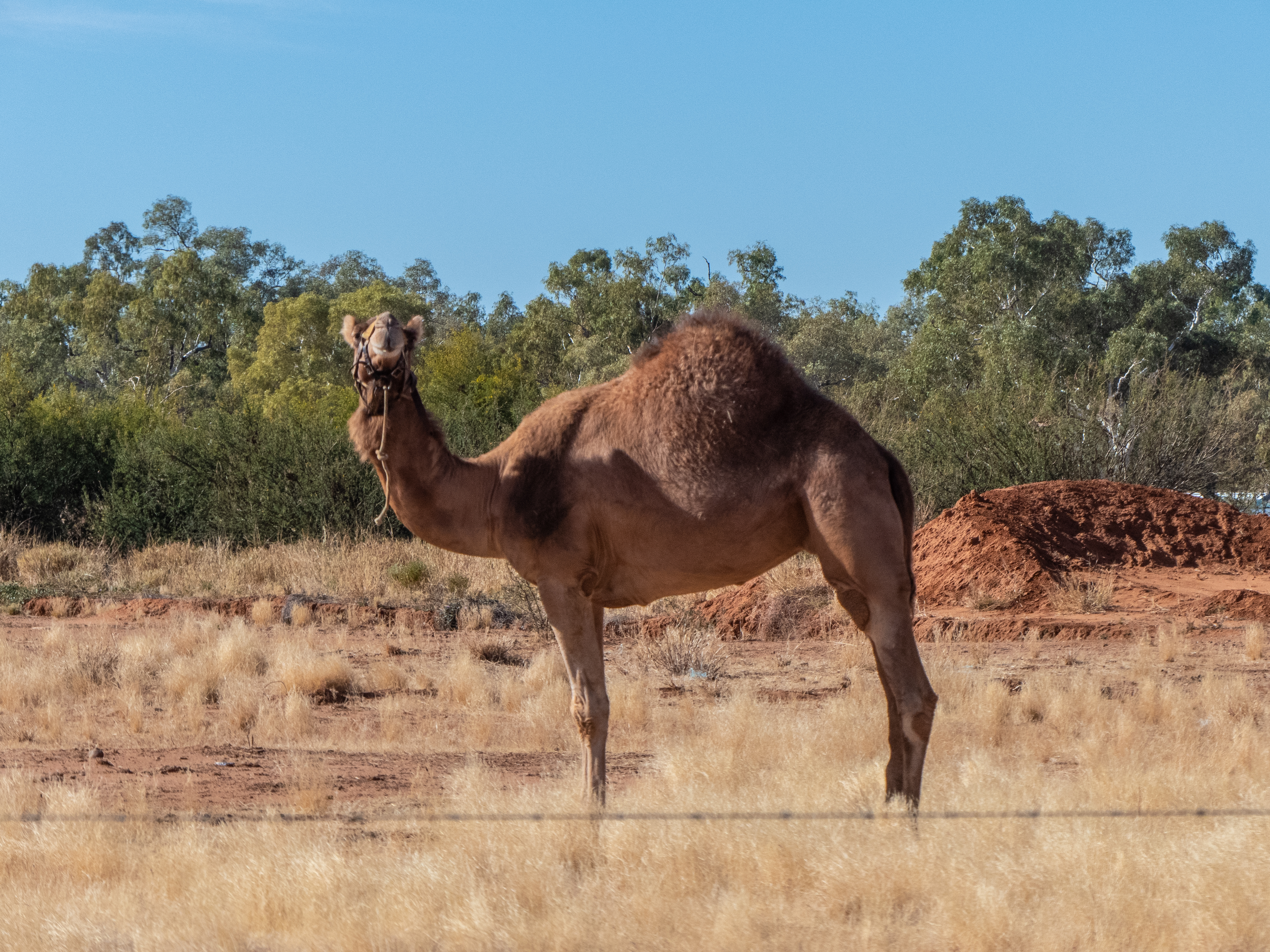
Dromedary in Queensland, Australia, showing its hump

This is a list of animals that have a naturally occurring hump or humps as a part of their anatomy.

Humps may evolve as a store of fat, a heat control mechanism, a development of muscular strength, or a form of display to other animals. It may also be a consequence of some behaviour, such as the diving of whales. Enlarged humps have also been selected for by some animal breeders for aesthetic or religious reasons.

== Mammals ==
- Dromedary – also known as the Arabian camel, is a large even-toed ungulate, of the genus Camelus, with one hump on its back. The hump stores up to 80 lb (36 kg) of fat, which the camel can break down into energy to meet its needs when resources are scarce; the hump also helps dissipate body heat.
- Bactrian camel – also known as the Mongolian camel or domestic Bactrian camel, is a large even-toed ungulate native to the steppes of Central Asia. It has two humps on its back, in contrast to the single-humped dromedary camel. Like the dromedary it can break down fat in its humps into energy to meet its needs when resources are scarce; and use them to help dissipate body heat.
- Wild Bactrian camel – Once thought to have originated from escaped domesticated Bactrian camels, genetic studies have established it as a separate species which diverged from the Bactrian camel about 1.1 million years ago. A critically endangered species living in parts of northwestern China and southwestern Mongolia.
- American bison – commonly known as the American buffalo or simply buffalo. Has a noticeable hump between its shoulder blades which unlike the camel is formed from muscle. The muscles assist in the shovelling of snow in winter allowing access to food.
- Gaur – Has a hump made up of muscle, humps of males are considerably larger than that of females.
- Moose – or elk (in Eurasia) is the largest and heaviest extant species in the deer family. Like the bison, it has evolved large muscles on top of its neck to help it shovel snow to find winter feed.
- White rhinoceros – This species of rhino has a bulge on the back of its neck made of thickened skin, a pad of fat, thick muscle and ligament that support the animal's massive head.
- Zebu – sometimes known by the collective nouns indicine cattle or humped cattle, is a species or subspecies of domestic cattle. The hump is composed of fat and gives the animal resilience to droughts, and helps it cool in extreme heat. The hump may have been exaggerated in size by selective breeding since domestication.
- The eland, the largest of the antelope family. Its genus has two species in Africa, the common eland of East and Southern Africa and the giant eland of Central and Western Africa. Both have a slight hump above the forelegs which occurs by the anatomy of its spinal column and is not a true hump.
- The hartebeest, a species of African grassland antelope, of which there are eight subspecies, all have a visible hump at the shoulder caused by the anatomy of the spine. The hump is due to the long dorsal processes of the vertebrae in the shoulder region.
- Humpback whale – A species of baleen whale. Humpbacks can easily be identified by their stocky body, and obvious hump when diving. Humpbacks do not normally have a hump on their backs; the name comes from the large hump that forms when they arch their backs before making a dive.
- The woolly mammoth, an extinct relative of the elephant that was adapted to cold Arctic environments, had a brown-fat hump like deposit behind its neck that may have functioned as a heat source and fat reservoir during winter.
- The brown bear has a distinctive shoulder hump made of muscle.

== Fish ==
- Humphead wrasse (Cheilinus undulatus) is a species of bony fish, the largest species of wrasse mainly found on coral reefs in the Indo-Pacific region. It has a prominent hump on top of its head. It is believed the hump is a signal to females how genetically healthy a male is in a similar to a lion's mane or a buck's antlers.
- Humphead glassfish
- Hump-headed blenny
- Other fish which have developed a hump on the top of their heads are various large-bodied cichlids such as the peacock bass, Midas cichlid, and the starry-night cichlid. The flowerhorn cichlid is a hybrid aquarium fish bred for an extremely bulbous hump.

== Other ==
- Several species of waterfowl have a protuberance known as the basal knob at the top rear end of their bill. Examples are the knob-billed duck, the swan, and the Chinese goose. The exact purpose of basal knobs is unknown but they may serve as an indicator of health or sexual maturity.
- A wide variety of birds have a casque, an enlargement of the bones of the upper mandible or the skull, either on the front of the face, or the top of the head, or both. Most hornbills and all cassowaries have a casque.
- Concavenator was an extinct genus of theropod dinosaur that lived approximately 130 million years ago during the early Cretaceous period. Two extremely tall vertebrae in front of the hips formed a tall but narrow and pointed crest (possibly supporting a hump) on the dinosaur's back. It may have been a fat store, a display, or a thermal regulator.
- Other dinosaurs that have been hypothesized to have humps include Spinosaurus, Morelladon, and Deinocheirus mirificus.
