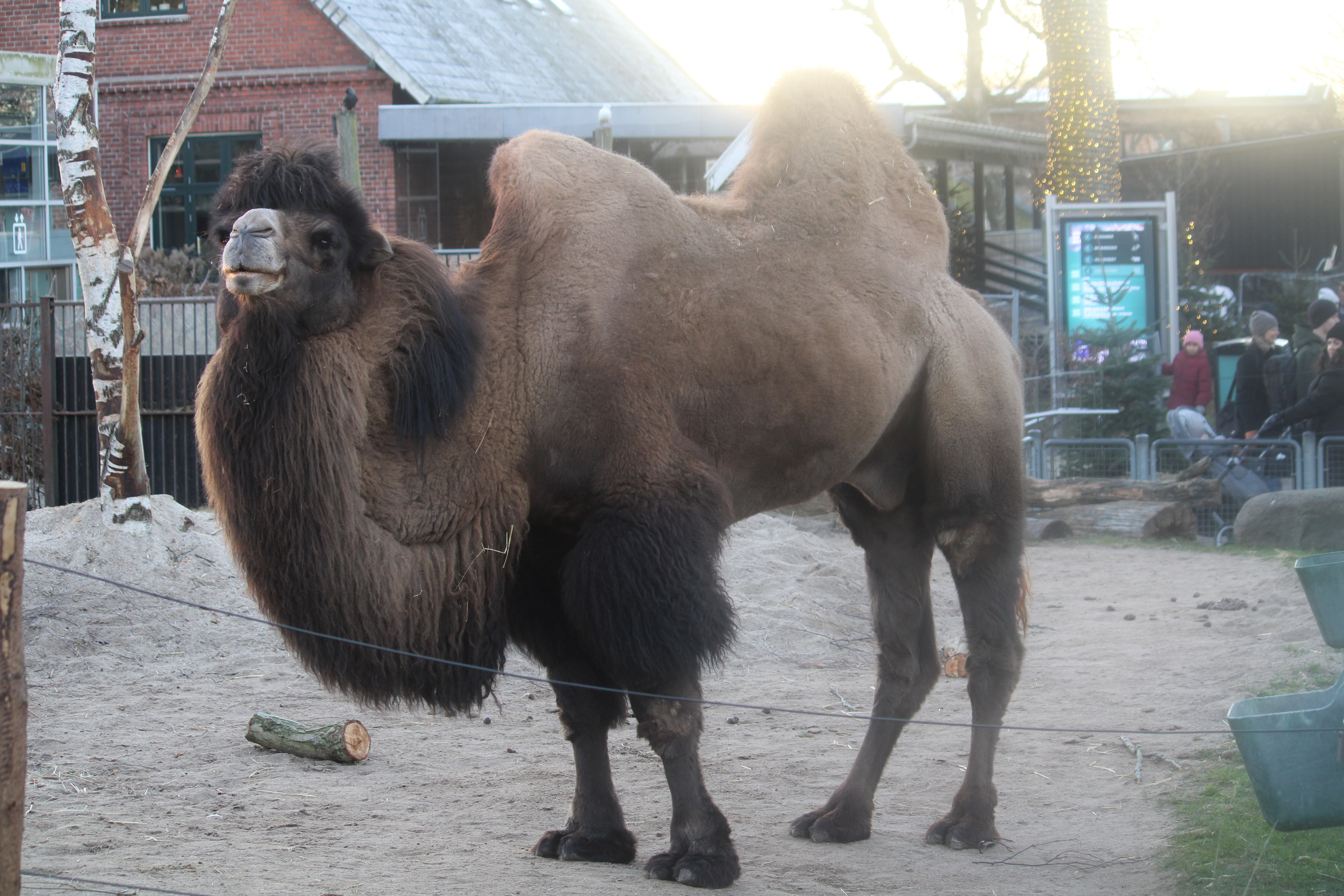
- A Bactrian camel at Copenhagen Zoo

Conservation status
- Domesticated

Scientific classification
- Kingdom: Animalia
- Phylum: Chordata
- Class: Mammalia
- Order: Artiodactyla
- Family: Camelidae
- Genus: Camelus
- Species: C. bactrianus

Binomial name
- Camelus bactrianus Linnaeus, 1758
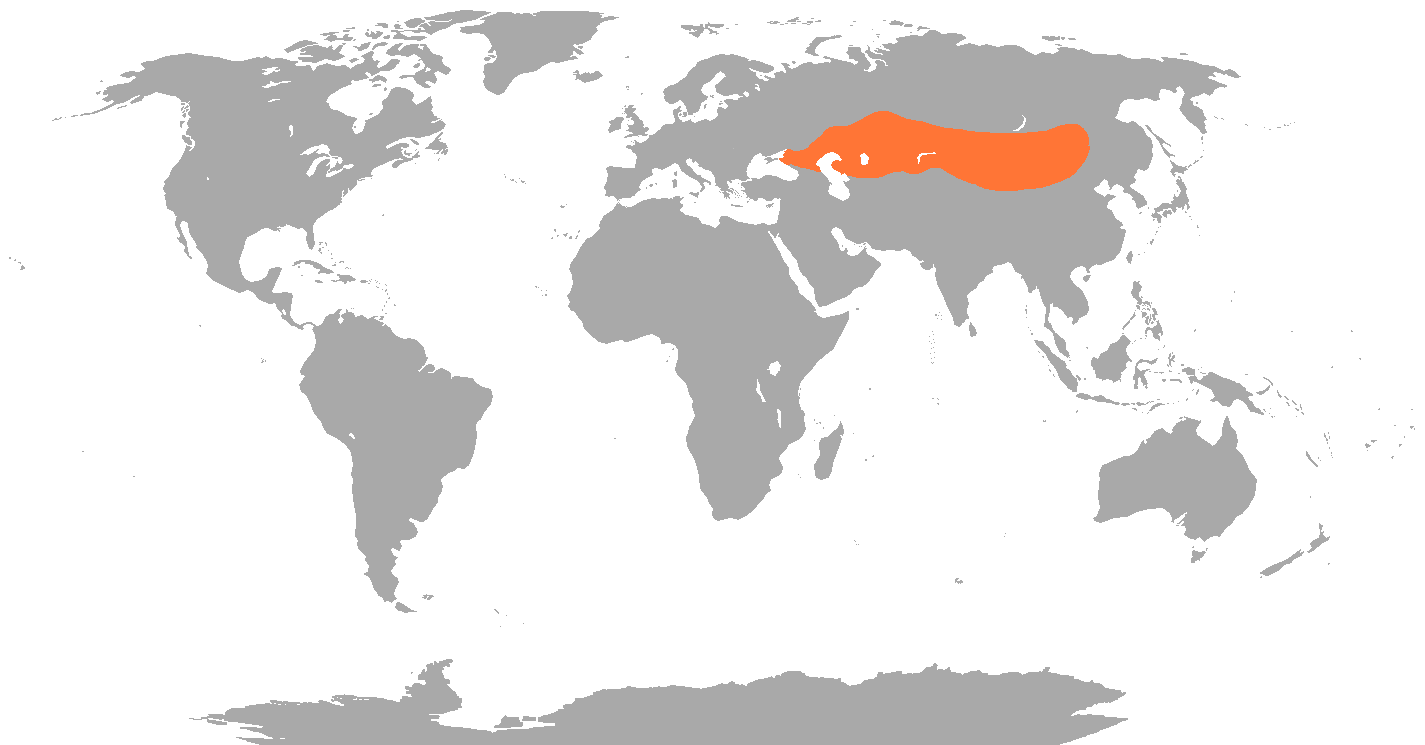

Synonyms
- List: Camelus bocharius Kolenati (1847); Camelus caucasicus Kolenati (1847); Camelus genuinus Kolenati (1847); Camelus orientalis J. Fischer (1829); Camelus tauricus J. Fischer (1829)

Audio

= Bactrian camel =

Species of mammal of Asia

The Bactrian camel (Camelus bactrianus), also known as the Mongolian camel, domestic Bactrian camel, two-humped camel or double-humped camel, is a camel native to the steppes of Central Asia. It has two humps on its back, in contrast to the single-humped dromedary. (Note: A mnemonic that helps one to remember the correct English word for each is: "Bactrian" begins with "B", and "Dromedary" begins with "D"; "B" on its side has two humps, whilst "D" on its side has only one hump.) Its population of 2 million exists mainly in the domesticated form. Their name comes from the ancient historical region of Bactria.

The domesticated Bactrian camel has served as pack animals in inner Asia since ancient times. With its tolerance for cold, drought, and high altitudes, it enabled the travel of caravans on the Silk Road. Bactrian camels, whether domesticated or feral, are a separate species from the wild Bactrian camel (Camelus ferus), which is the only truly wild (as opposed to feral) species of camelid in the Old World. Domestic Bactrian camels do not descend from wild Bactrian camels, with the two species having split around 1 million years ago.

== Taxonomy ==
Phylogenetic relationships of domestic Bactrian camels compared to living and recently extinct camels

- Camelidae
  - Lamini (llamas)
  - Camelini
    - †Camelops
    - Camelus
      - Camelus dromedarius (dromedary)
      - - †Camelus knoblochi
        - Camelus ferus (wild Bactrian camel)
        - Camelus bactrianus (domestic Bactrian camel)

The Bactrian camel shares the genus Camelus with the dromedary (C. dromedarius) and the wild Bactrian camel (C. ferus). The Bactrian camel belongs to the family Camelidae. The ancient Greek philosopher Aristotle was the first European to describe the camels: in his 4th century BCE History of Animals, he identified the one-humped Arabian camel and the two-humped Bactrian camel. The Bactrian camel was given its current binomial name Camelus bactrianus by Swedish zoologist Carl Linnaeus in his 1758 publication Systema Naturae.

Though sharing a closer common ancestor with it than with the dromedary, the domestic Bactrian camel does not descend from the wild Bactrian camel, with the two species having diverged hundreds of thousands of years ago, with their mitochondrial genomes estimated to have diverged around 1 million years ago. Genetic evidence suggests that both Bactrian camel species are closely related to the extinct giant camel species Camelus knoblochi which became extinct around 20,000 years ago, which is equidistant from both living Bactrian camel species.

The Bactrian camel and the dromedary often interbreed to produce fertile offspring. Where the ranges of the two species overlap, such as in northern Punjab, Iran and Afghanistan, the phenotypic differences between them tend to decrease as a result of extensive crossbreeding between them. The fertility of their hybrid has given rise to speculation that the Bactrian camel and the dromedary should be merged into a single species with two varieties. However, a 1994 analysis of the mitochondrial cytochrome b gene revealed that the species display 10.3% divergence in their sequences.

== Description ==
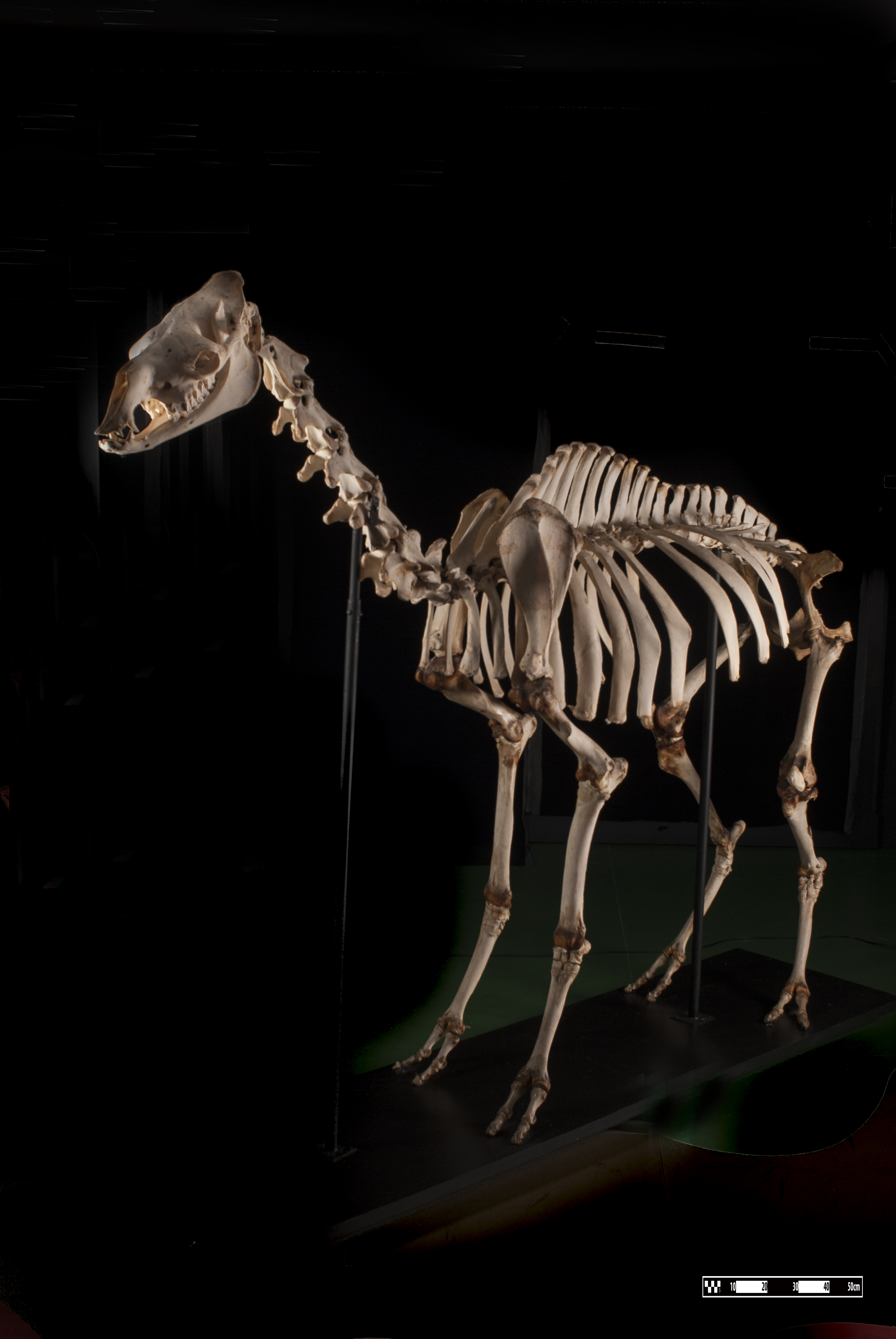
Skeleton of a Bactrian camel

The Bactrian camel is the largest mammal in its native range and is the largest living camel while being shorter at the shoulder than the dromedary. Shoulder height is from 160 to 180 cm (5.2 to 5.9 ft) with the overall height ranging from 230 to 250 cm (7.5 to 8.2 ft), head-and-body length is 225–350 cm (7.38–11.48 ft), and the tail length is 35–55 cm (14–22 in). At the top of the humps, the average height is 213 cm (6.99 ft).

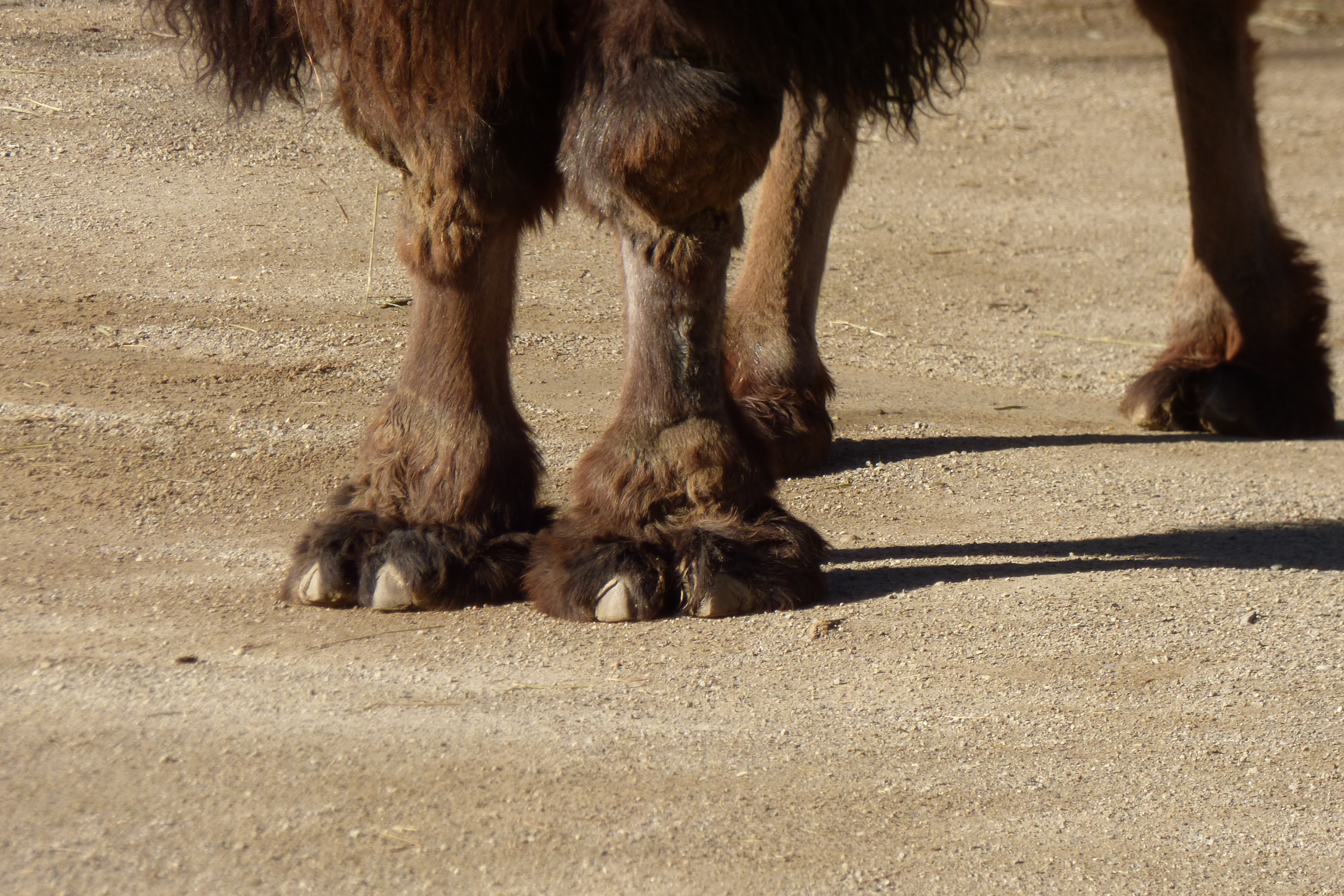
Detail of a Bactrian camel's feet

Body mass can range from 300 to 1,000 kg (660 to 2,200 lb), with males weighing around 600 kg (1,300 lb), and females around 480 kg (1,060 lb). Its long, wooly coat varies in colour from dark brown to sandy beige. A mane and beard of long hair occurs on the neck and throat, with hairs measuring up to 25 cm (9.8 in) long.

The shaggy winter coat is shed extremely rapidly, with huge sections peeling off at once, appearing as if sloppily shorn. The two humps on the back are composed of fat (not water as is sometimes thought). The face is typical of a camelid, being long and somewhat triangular, with a split upper lip. The long eyelashes, along with the sealable nostrils, help to keep out dust in the frequent sandstorms which occur in their natural range. The two broad toes on each foot have undivided soles and are able to spread widely as an adaptation to walking on sand. The feet are very tough, as befits an animal of extreme environments.

== Natural habitat ==
These camels are migratory, and their habitat ranges from rock-dominated mountain massifs to flat steppe, arid desert, (mostly the Gobi Desert), stony plains and sand dunes. Conditions are extremely harsh – vegetation is sparse, water sources are limited and temperatures are extreme. The coat of the Bactrian camel can withstand cold as low as −30 °C (−22 °F) in winter to 50 °C (122 °F) in summer. The camels' distribution is linked to the availability of water, with large groups congregating near rivers after rain or at the foot of the mountains, where water can be obtained from springs in the summer months, and in the form of snow during the winter.

== Life history ==
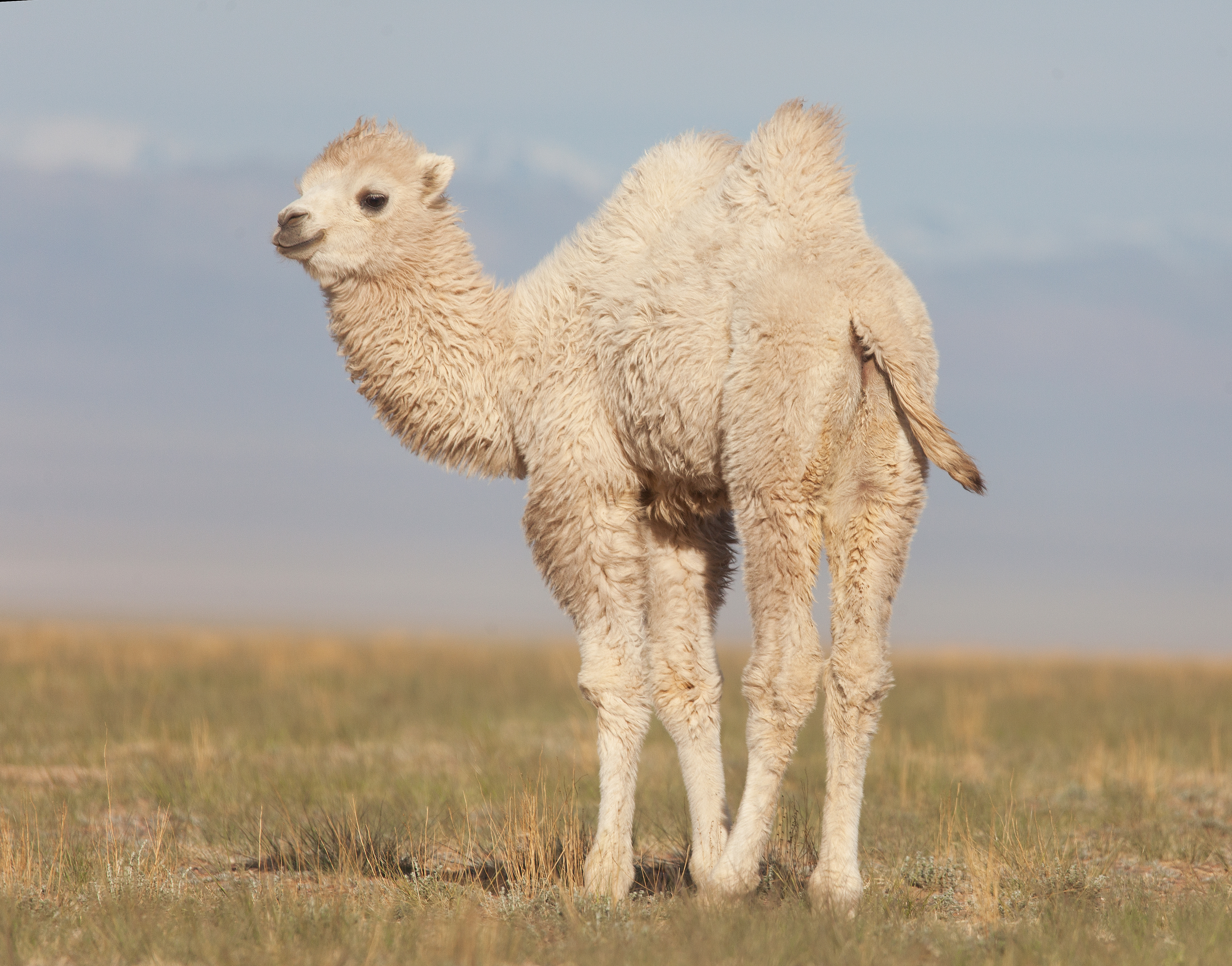
A young calf in western Mongolia

Bactrian camels are exceptionally adept at withstanding wide variations in temperature, ranging from freezing cold to blistering heat. They can go without water for months at a time, but when water is available they may drink up to 57 L (13 imp gal; 15 US gal). A thirsty camel in a hot dry season can drink up to 200 L (44 imp gal; 53 US gal) of water in one day. When well fed, the humps are plump and erect, but as resources decline, they shrink and lean to the side. When moving faster than a walking speed, they pace, by stepping forwards with both legs on the same side (as opposed to trotting, using alternate diagonals as done by most other quadrupeds). Speeds of up to 65 kilometres per hour (40 mph) have been recorded, but they rarely move this fast. Usually doing sustained speeds of 40 km/h (25 mph) Domestic Bactrian camels have also been observed swimming. Their sense of sight is well developed and their sense of smell is extremely good. The lifespan of Bactrian camels is estimated at up to 50 years in the wild, but their average lifespan in the wild is around 30, domesticated ones haven't been recorded as living longer than 35 years.

=== Diet ===
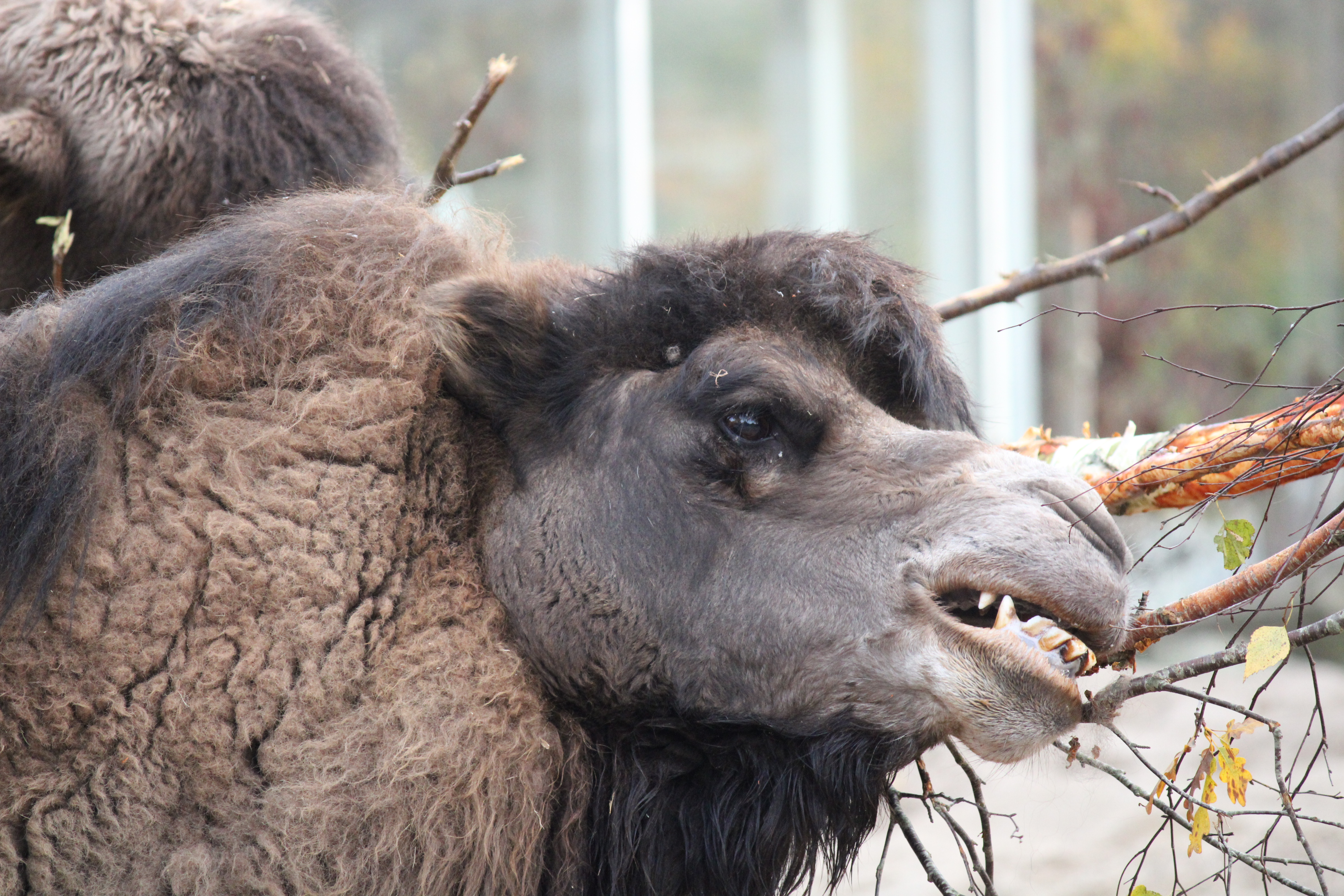
A Bactrian camel eating at Copenhagen Zoo

Bactrian camels are diurnal, sleeping in the open at night and foraging for food during the day. They are primarily herbivorous and constantly graze on grasses. With tough mouths that can withstand sharp objects such as thorns, they are able to eat plants that are dry, prickly, salty or bitter, and can ingest virtually any kind of vegetation. Halophytic plants, which are plants that have been growing in water with a high saline concentration, are a necessary part of the Bactrian camel's diet. When other nutrient sources are not available, these camels may feed on fish, carcasses, gnawing on bones, skin, or various different kinds of flesh. In more extreme conditions, they may eat any material they find, which has included rope, sandals, and even tents. Their ability to feed on a wide range of foods allows them to live in areas with sparse vegetation. The first time food is swallowed, it is not fully chewed. The partly masticated food (called cud) goes into the stomach and later is brought back up for further chewing.

Bactrian camels belong to a fairly small group of animals that regularly eat snow to provide their water needs. Animals living above the snowline may have to do this, as snow and ice can be the only forms of water during winter, and by doing so, their range is greatly enlarged. The latent heat of snow and ice is large compared with the heat capacity of water, forcing animals to eat only small amounts at a time.

=== Reproduction ===
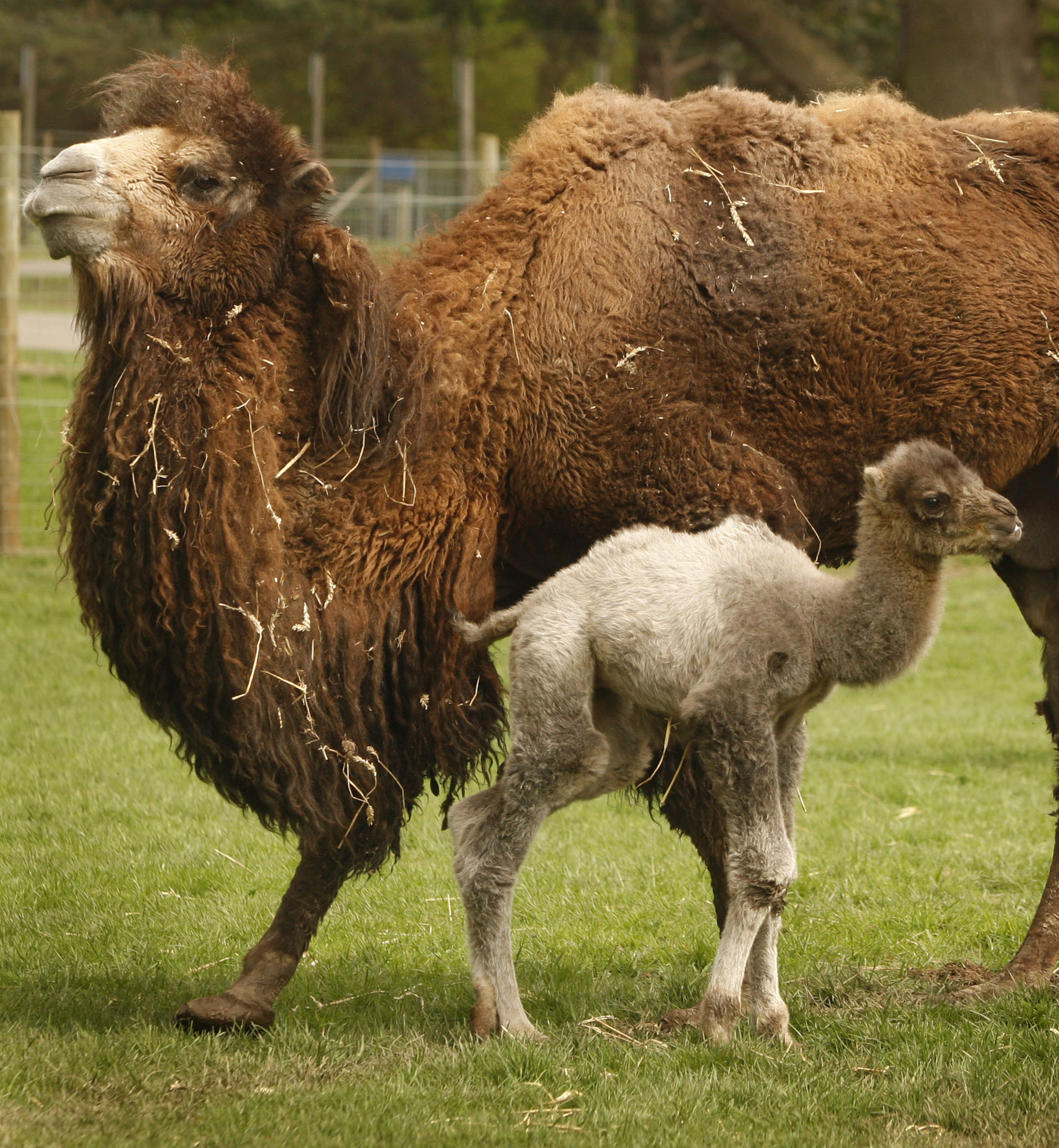
Mother and calf

Bactrian camels are induced ovulators – they ovulate after insemination (insertion of semen into the vagina); the seminal plasma, not the spermatozoa, induces ovulation. Ovulation occurs in 87% of females after insemination: 66% ovulate within 36 hours and the rest by 48 hours (the same as natural mating). The least amount of semen required to elicit ovulation is about 1.0 ml.

Males during mating time are often quite violent and may bite, spit, or attempt to sit on other male camels. The age of sexual maturity varies, but is usually reached at 3–5 years. Gestation lasts around 13 months. One or occasionally two calves are produced, and the female can give birth to a new calf every other year. Young Bactrian camels are precocial, being able to stand and run shortly after birth, and are fairly large at an average birth weight of 36 kg (79 lb). They are nursed for about 1.5 years. The young calf stays with its mother for three to five years, until it reaches sexual maturity, and often helps raise subsequent generations for those years. Wild camels sometimes breed with domesticated or feral camels.

Bactrian camels have been mostly domesticated for thousands of years and are widely bred by pastoralist and agricultural communities across Central Asia, the Middle East, and parts of China and Mongolia. Breeding practices vary by region, but most focus on traits such as hardiness, milk production, load-bearing ability, and temperament. In Mongolia, herders traditionally manage breeding by selectively mating camels during the rutting season, often using older, experienced bulls known for their vigor and fertility. These males are isolated with females to encourage mating and reduce aggression toward other camels.

In Iran and parts of Afghanistan, camel breeding is commonly integrated into mixed farming systems, where camels provide transport and milk alongside other livestock. Semen collection and artificial insemination techniques are increasingly used in breeding programs in Central Asia, particularly in Kazakhstan and Uzbekistan, to improve genetic stock and ensure ovulation timing aligns with optimal conditions for conception.

In China's Xinjiang region, large-scale camel farms are maintained by both government-supported operations and private breeders, focusing on conserving the genetics of the domesticated Bactrian camel and improving reproductive efficiency. Advances in veterinary care, nutritional supplementation, and controlled breeding environments have increased calving rates in recent decades.

Across these regions, breeding cycles are timed to coincide with favorable seasonal conditions to maximize calf survival. Female camels are usually bred every two years to allow for full recovery after gestation and lactation, although in some cases, higher-frequency breeding is practiced under intensive management systems. Offspring are commonly used in transportation, wool production, or sold in local markets, forming a critical part of the livelihood for many camel-rearing communities.

== Climate adaptations ==
The Bactrian camel has shaggy fur that keeps them warm. They live in areas with extreme temperatures, ranging from intense cold to severe heat. When it gets warm out, their shaggy coat will shed, helping the camel control its body temperature. The Bactrian camel has two humps to store the energy they get from fat. If energy sources become scarce, camels can rely on the energy stored in their humps. They can also drink up to 35 US gallons (130 L) of water at a time.

== Evolutionary history ==
As of the 1980s, a complete range of fossils suggests the first camelids appeared in North America about 30 million years ago, had relatively small body masses, and were adapted to warm climates. By the early Pleistocene (about 2 million years ago), they had already evolved into a form similar to the current Bactrian camel, and many individuals permanently migrated to the opposite end of the Bering Strait in an abrupt fashion, probably as a response to the advancing ice age. The remaining related types of American camelids are now only in South America.

== Genome ==
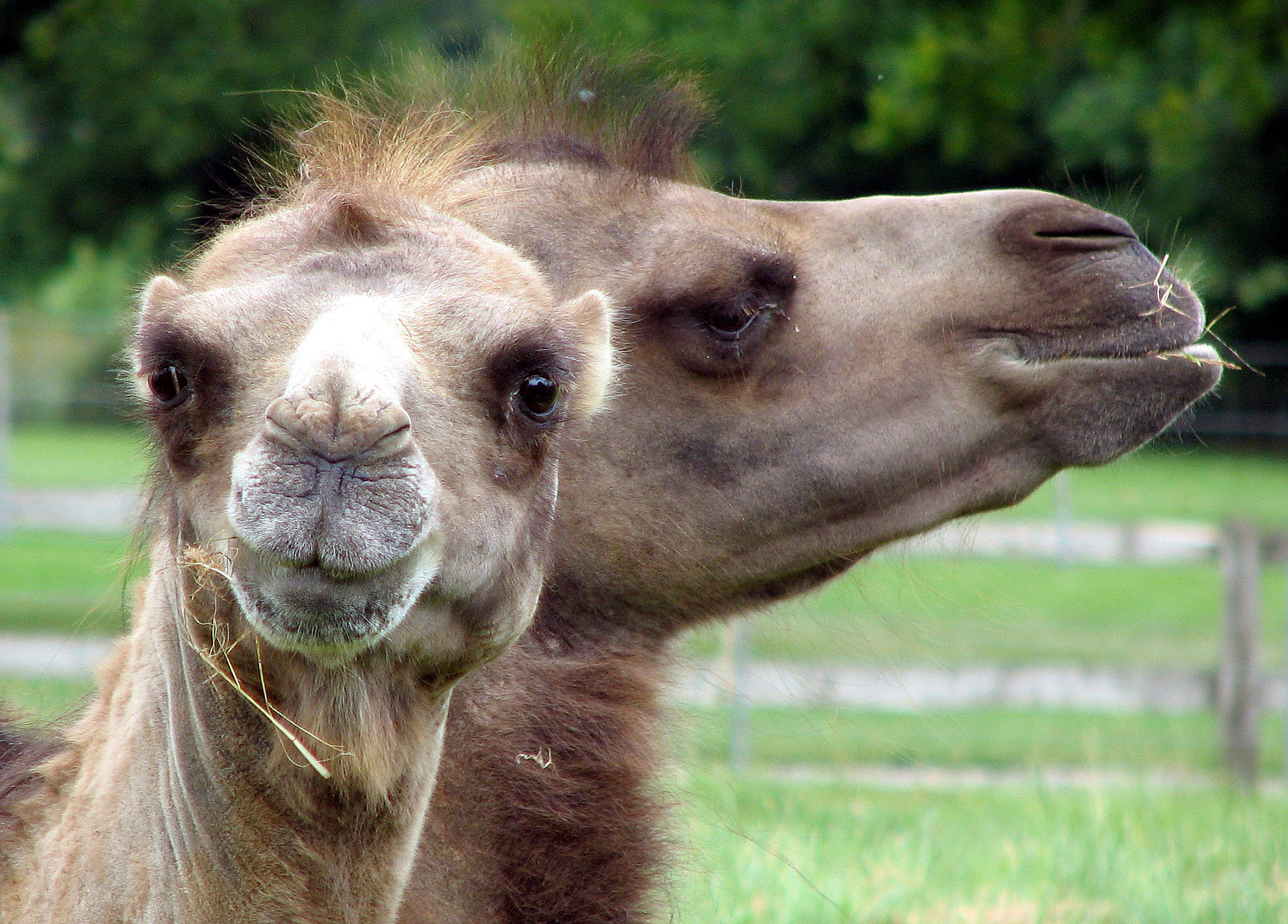
Two Bactrian camels in Cotswold Wildlife Park

The Bactrian Camels Genome Sequencing and Analysis Consortium provides a C. bactrianus ferus genome using next generation sequencing.

Several effective population size studies have been carried out. They show several bottlenecks in both wild and domesticated Bactrians over the past 350,000 years.

== Relationship to humans ==
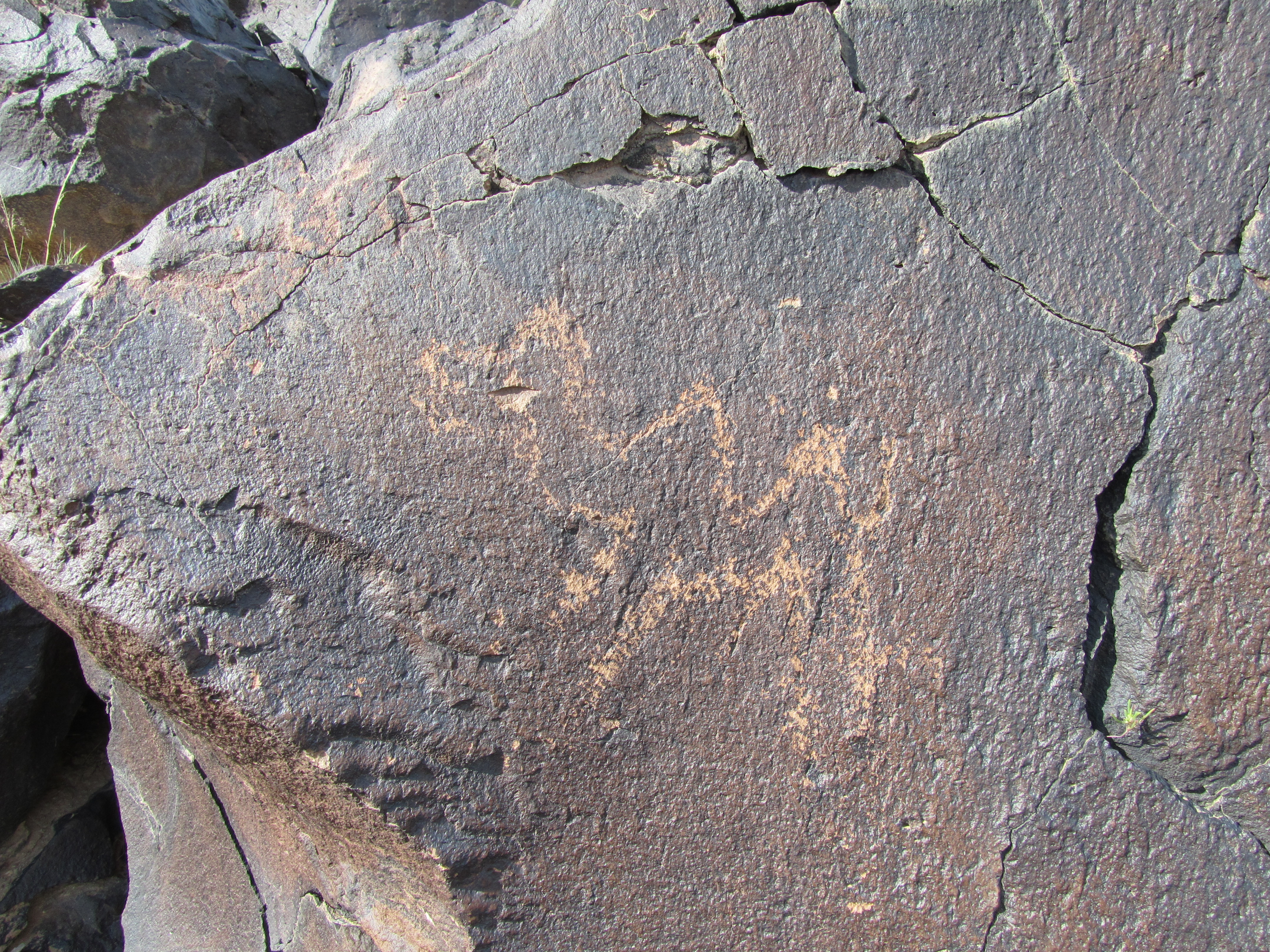
Petroglyphs

The Bactrian camel was domesticated circa 2500 BCE. The dromedary is believed to have been domesticated between 4000 BCE and 2000 BCE in Arabia. As pack animals, these ungulates are virtually unsurpassed, able to carry 170–250 kg (370–550 lb) at a rate of 47 kilometres (29 mi) per day, or 4 kilometres per hour (2.5 mph) over a period of four days. The species was a mainstay of transportation on the Silk Road. The Bactrian camel was an important aspect in human transportation, they were able to withstand harsh conditions, which made them ideal for long-distance travel. Furthermore, Bactrian camels are frequently ridden, especially in desertified areas. In ancient Sindh, for example, Bactrian camels of two humps were initially used by the rich for riding. The camel was later brought to other areas such as Balochistan and Iran for the same purpose.

Tang dynasty model, owned by Agatha Christie

Bactrian camels have been the focus of artwork throughout history. For example, westerners from the Tarim Basin and elsewhere were depicted in numerous ceramic figurines of the Chinese Tang dynasty (618–907).

=== Central Asian symbolism ===
In the early medieval culture of the Bukhara oasis, the male two-humped Bactrian camel had a symbolic and heraldic role. Images of Bactrian camels occur frequently on copper coins of the pre-Islamic rulers of Bukhara, especially in connection with Varakhsha. According to the commentary to Tarikh-i Bukhara, this image was associated with Verethragna, the Avestan deity of war and victory, and functioned both as a protective symbol of the city and as a heraldic emblem of the rulers of Bukhara.

The same commentary notes that in the wall paintings of the eastern hall of the palace at Varakhsha, the ruler is shown on a throne whose legs are decorated with winged camels. Winged camels are also attested in other works of early medieval Central Asian art, including a seventh-century Sogdian jug kept in the Hermitage and a wall painting from the ruler's palace at Panjakent. The medieval Bukhara-area place name Narshakh has also been connected with the word nar, meaning “male camel”.

=== United States imports ===
Bactrian camels were imported to the U.S. several times in the mid- to late 19th century, both by the U.S. military and by merchants and miners, looking for pack animals sturdier and hardier than horses and mules. Although the camels met these needs, the United States Camel Corps was never considered much of a success. Having brought two shipments of fewer than 100 camels to the U.S., plans were made to import another 1,000, but the US Civil War interrupted this. Most surviving camels of these endeavors, both military and private, were turned loose to survive in the wild. As a result, small feral herds of Bactrian camels existed during the late 19th century in the southwest deserts of the United States.

One United States Camel Corps camel was later sold to Ringling Brothers and was also in several early Hollywood films.

=== Documentaries ===
- The Story of the Weeping Camel is a 2003 Mongolian docudrama about a family of nomadic shepherds trying to get a white calf accepted by his mother, which rejected him after a difficult birth.

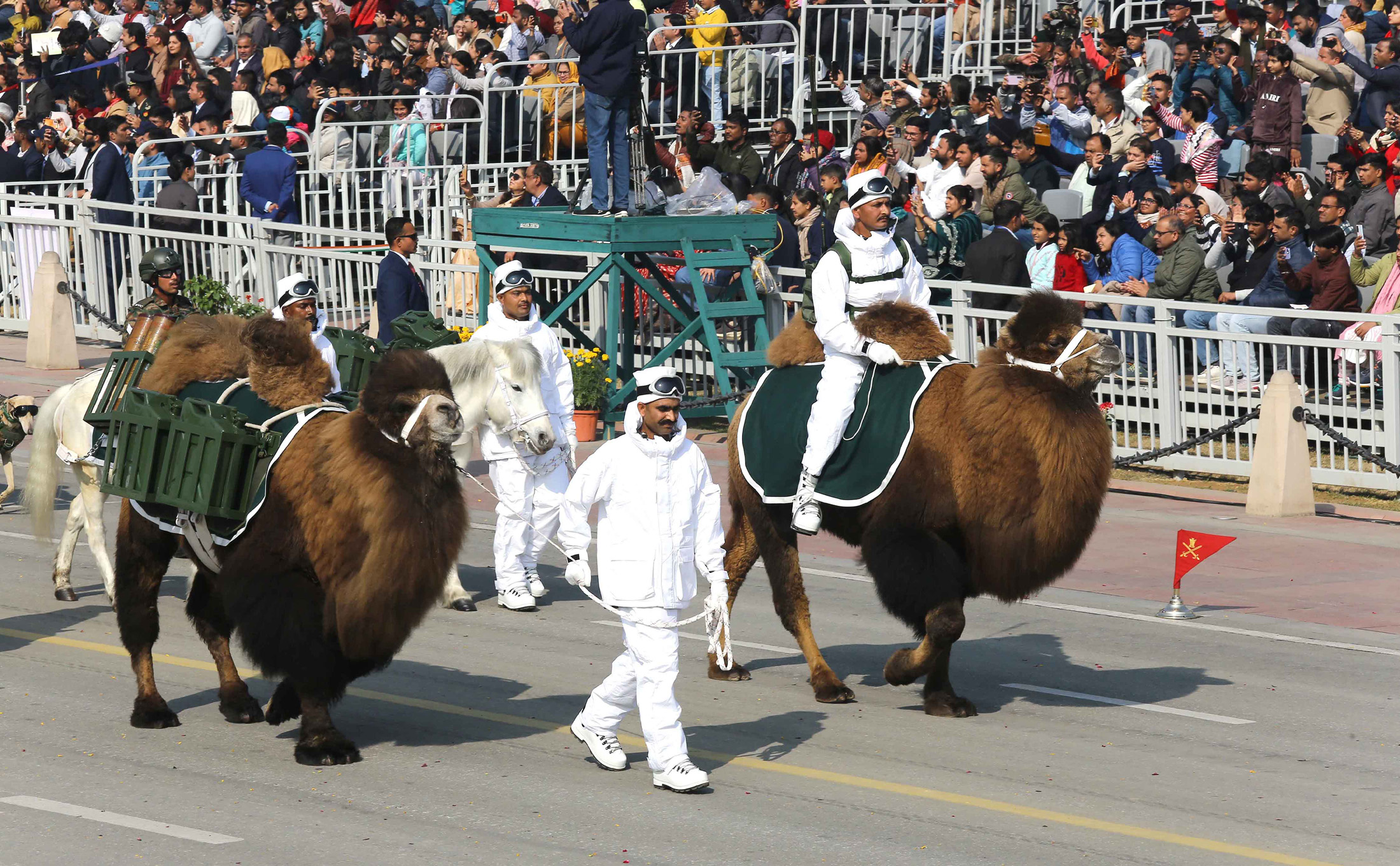
Bactrian Camels of Indian army on eve of 77th Republic Day Parade 2026

=== Military use ===
The Indian Army uses these camels to patrol in Ladakh. It was concluded that after carrying out trials and doing a comparative study with a single-humped camel brought from Rajasthan that the double-humped camel is better suited for the task at hand. Colonel Manoj Batra, a veterinary officer of the Indian Army, stated that the double-humped camel "are best suited for these conditions. They can carry loads of 170 kilograms (370 lb) at more than 17,000 feet (5,200 m) which is much more than the ponies that are being used as of now. They can survive without water for at least 72 hours."

The Russian Ground Forces have used the Bactrian Camel in its Russo-Ukrainian war (2022–present) to carry heavy loads such as ammunition and supplies to the frontline. Russian Forces have been reported to have been using camels for transport as early as February 2025. A camel was seen captured by the Ukrainian Ground Forces on 28 October 2025 which was deserted by Russians during a Ukrainian counter offensive near Kharkiv.

== Gallery ==
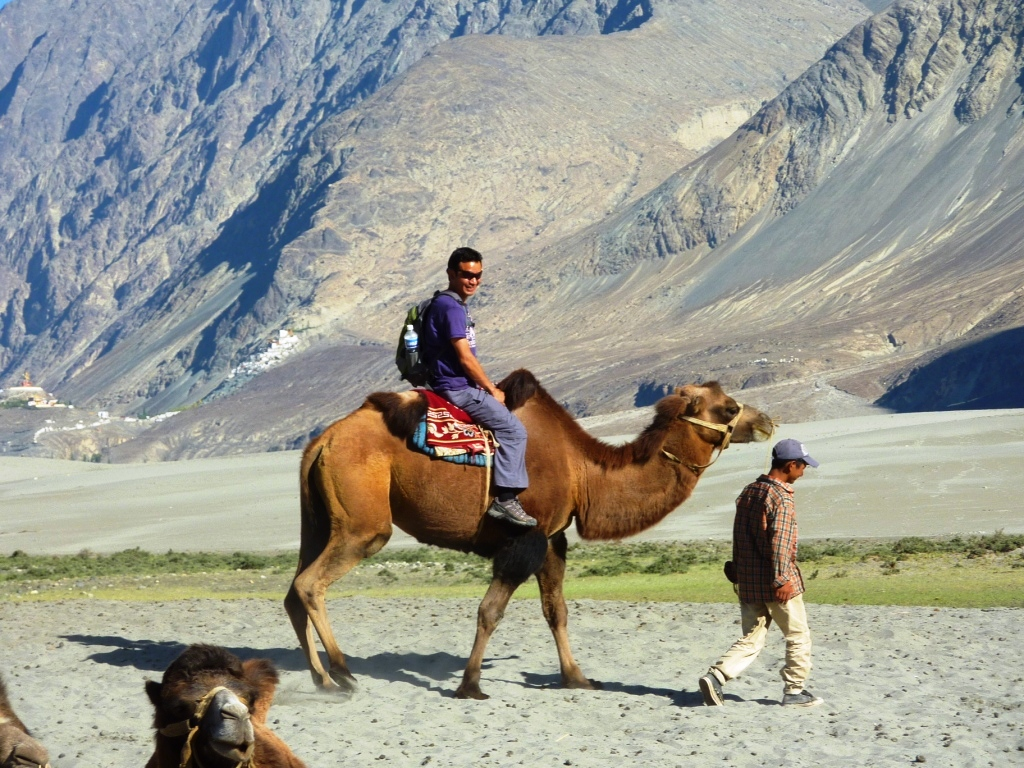
Riding in Nubra Valley, India

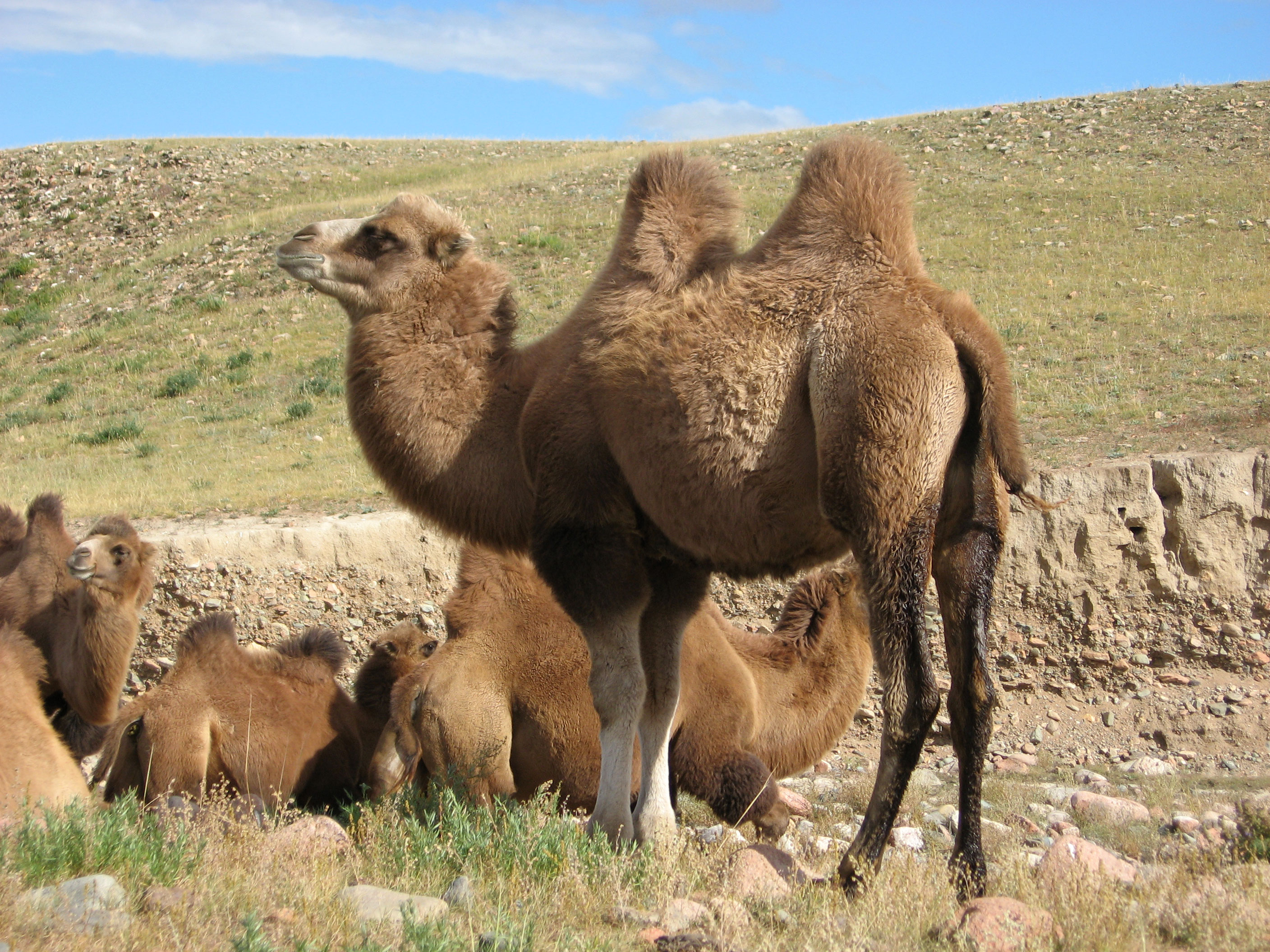
Mongolia

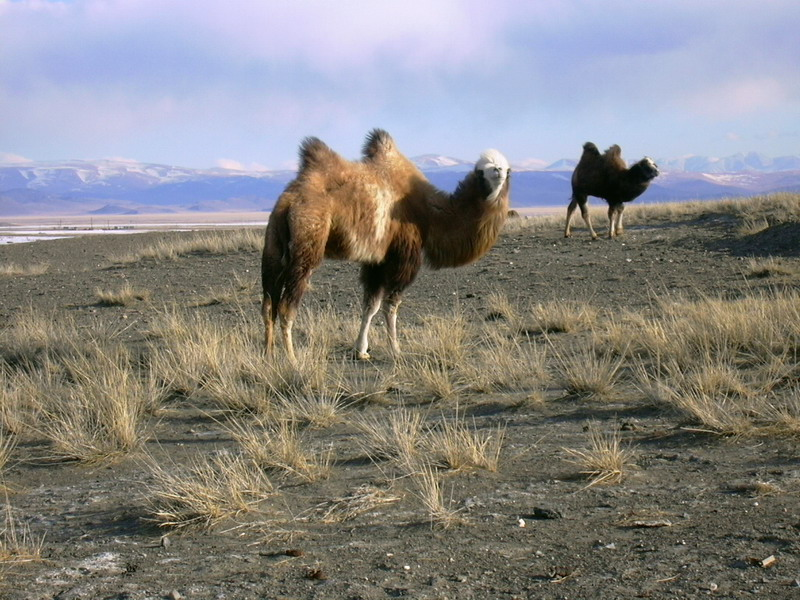
Chuya Steppe

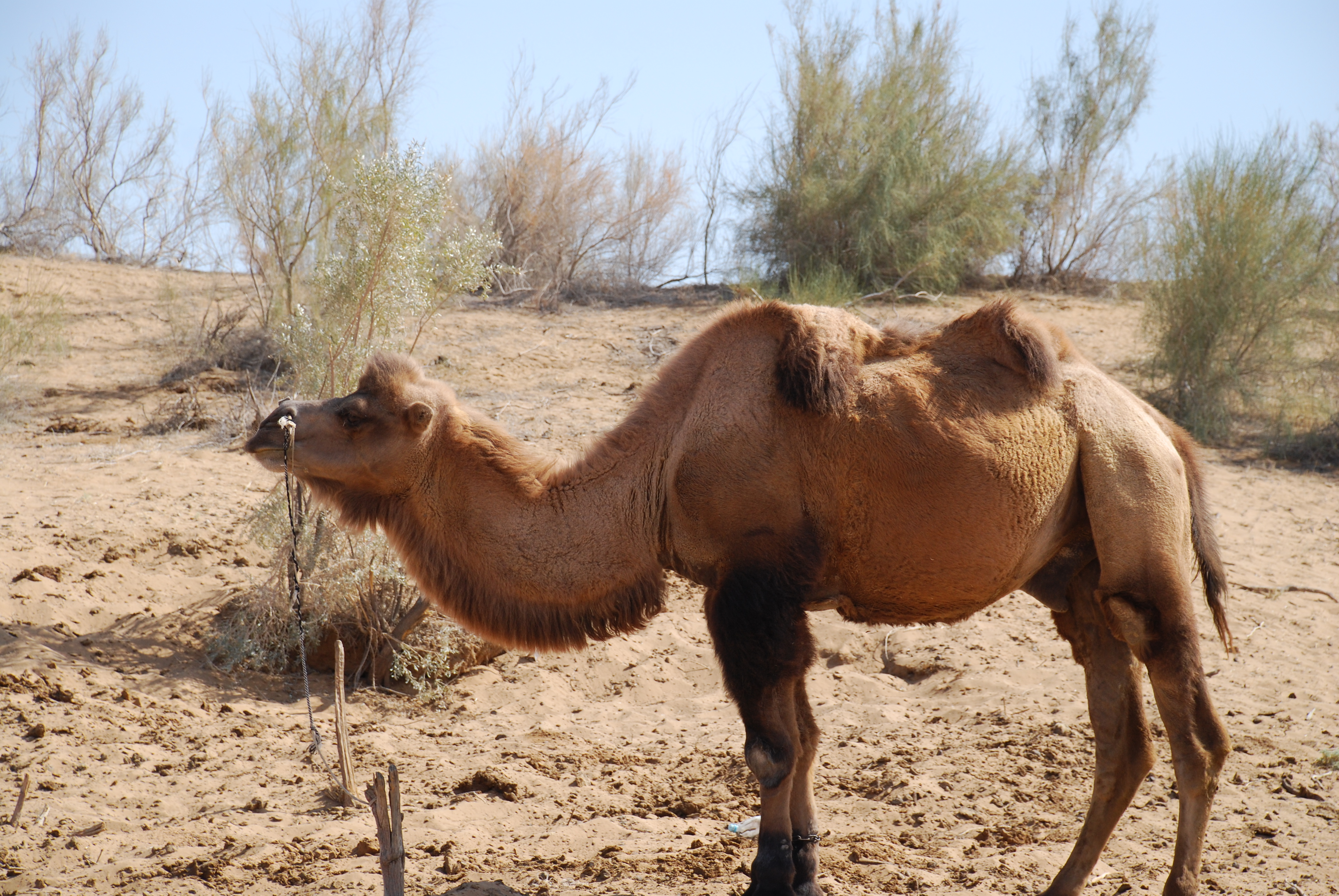
Bactrian Camels in the Kyzyl Kum Desert

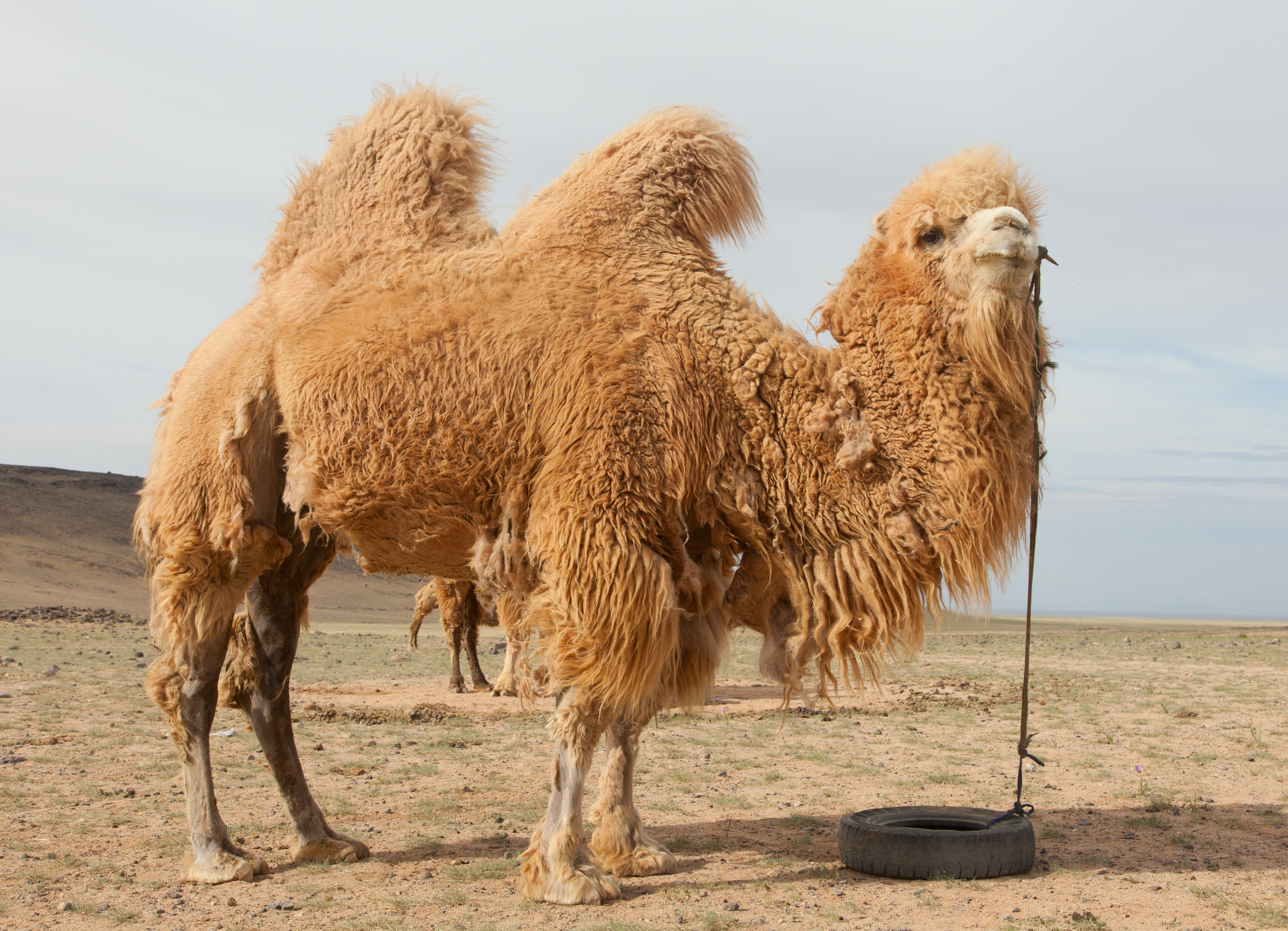
Farm in Central Mongolia

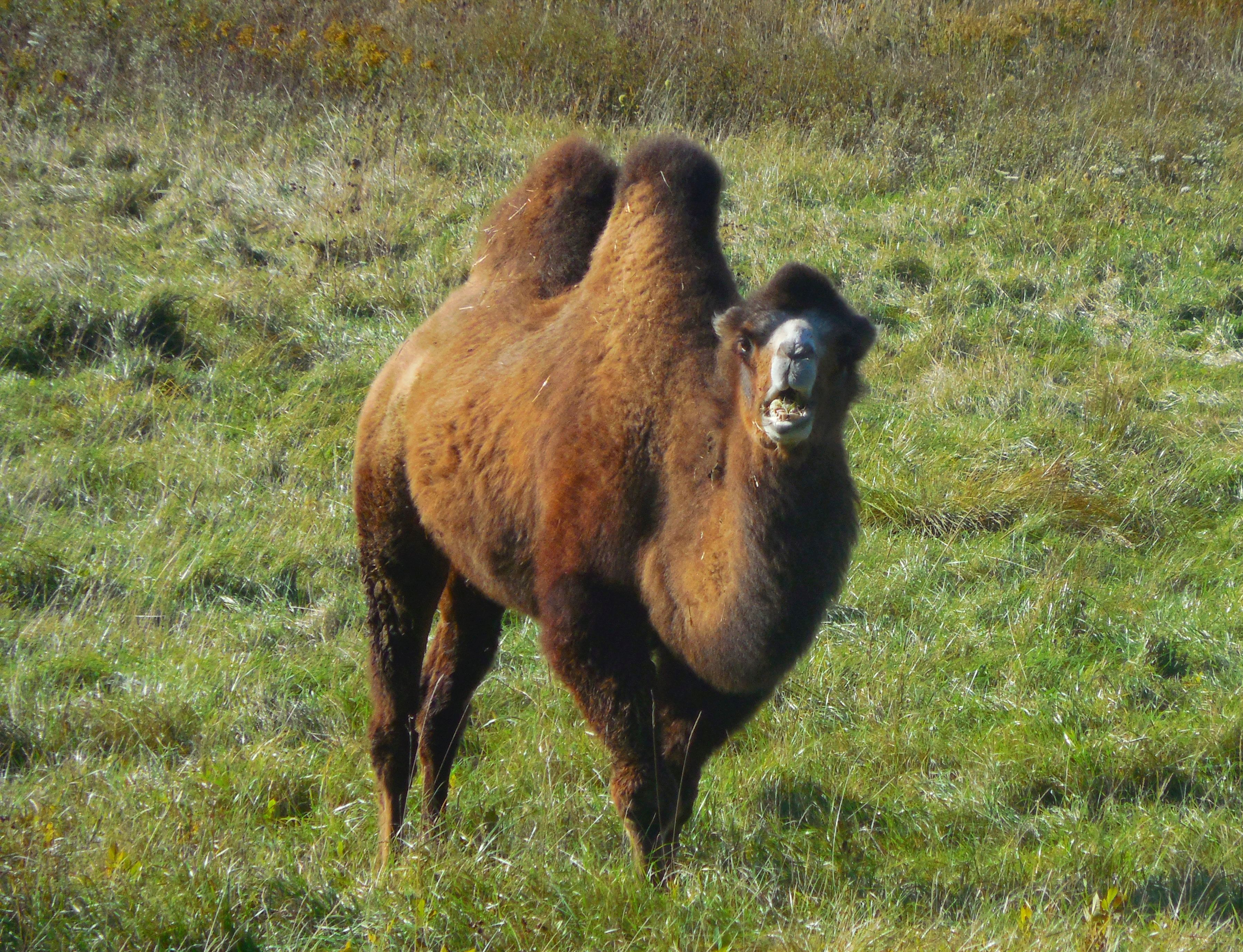
Farm in Vermont, US

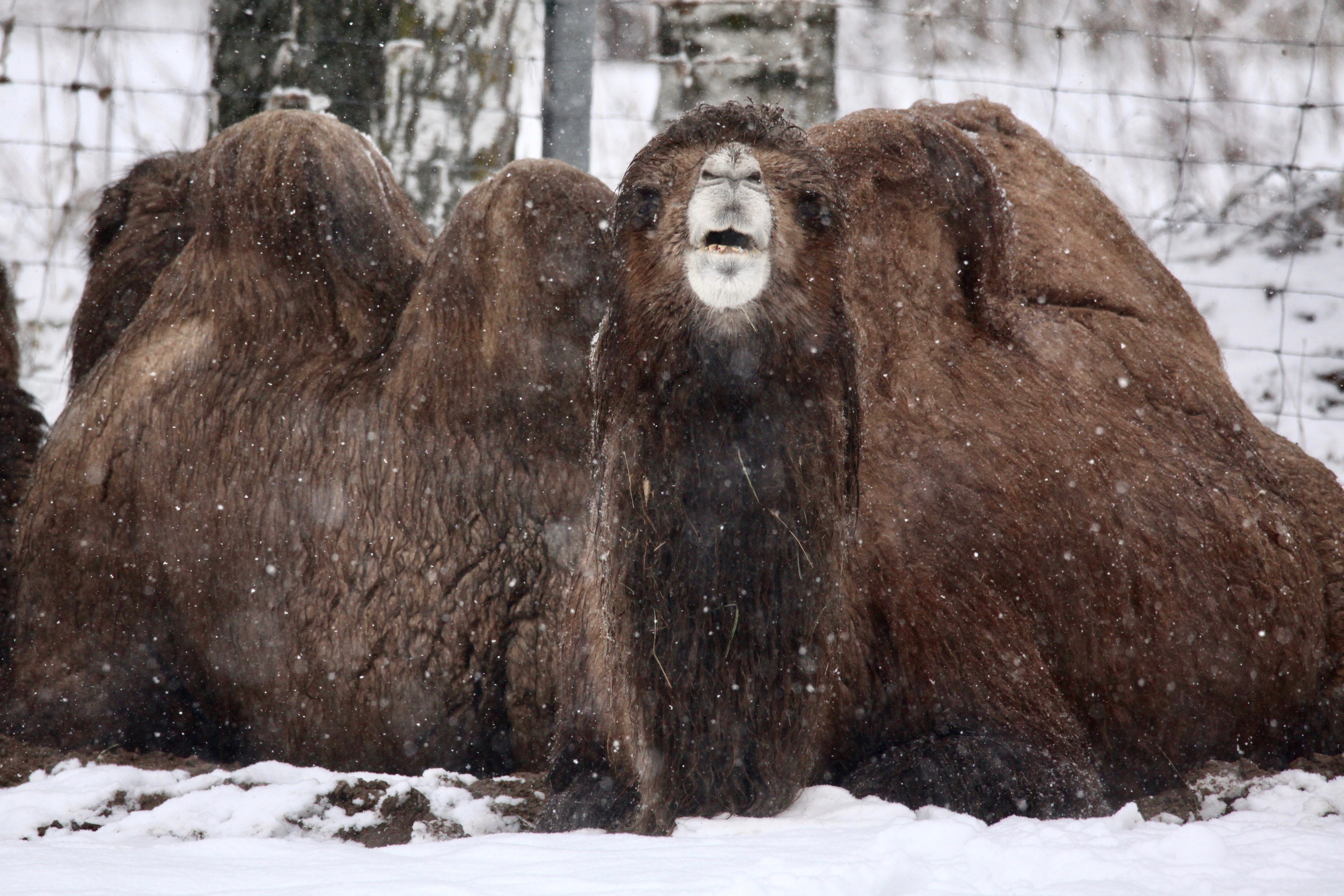
Tallinn Zoo

Bactrian camel

== See also ==
- Bactria
- Camel
- List of animals with humps
