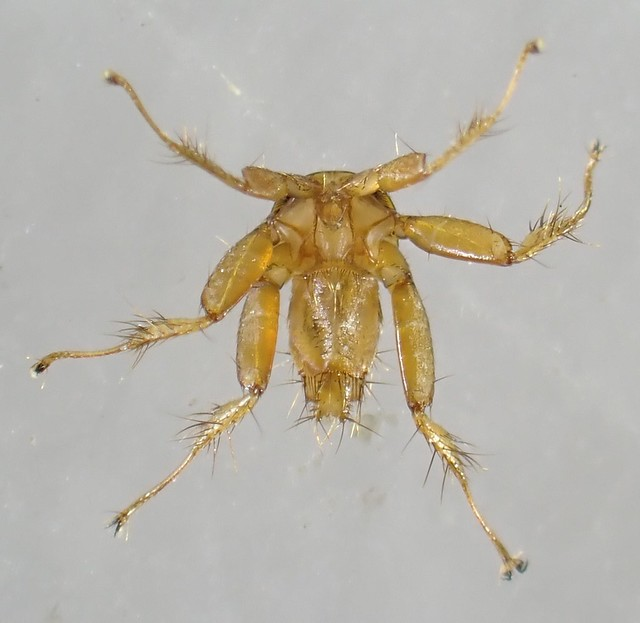
- Basilia nana Theodor & Moscona 1954 ♀

Scientific classification
- Kingdom: Animalia
- Phylum: Arthropoda
- Class: Insecta
- Order: Diptera
- Family: Nycteribiidae
- Subfamily: Nycteribiinae
- Genus: Basilia; Miranda-Ribeiro 1903

Type species
- Basilia ferruginea Miranda-Ribeiro 1903

= Basilia (fly) =

Genus of flies

Basilia is a genus of bat flies in the family Nycteribiidae.

== Species ==
These 121 species belong to the genus Basilia:

- Basilia aequisetosa (Theodor, 1956)
- Basilia afghanica Theodor, 1967
- Basilia aitkeni Maa, 1971
- Basilia amiculata (Speiser, 1907)
- Basilia anceps Guimarães & Andretta, 1956
- Basilia andersoni Peterson & Maa, 1970
- Basilia anomala Guimarães & Andretta, 1956
- Basilia ansifera Theodor, 1956
- Basilia antrozoi (Townsend, 1893)
- Basilia astochia Peterson & Maa, 1970
- Basilia barbarae Maa, 1971
- Basilia bathybothyra Speiser, 1907
- Basilia bellardii (Rondani, 1878)
- Basilia benkingi Maa, 1968
- Basilia bequaerti Guimarães & Andretta, 1956
- Basilia blainvillii (Leach, 1817)
- Basilia boardmani Rozeboom, 1934 (southeastern myotis bat fly)
- Basilia borneensis Theodor, 1967
- Basilia bouvieri (Falcoz, 1924)
- Basilia brevicauda (Musgrave, 1925)
- Basilia brevipes (Theodor, 1956)
- Basilia burmensis (Theodor, 1954)
- Basilia burrelli (Musgrave, 1927)
- Basilia carteri Scott, 1936
- Basilia chlamydophora (Speiser, 1903)
- Basilia constricta Guimarães & Andretta, 1956
- Basilia corynorhini (Ferris, 1916)
- Basilia costaricensis Guimarães & Andretta, 1956
- Basilia cubana Hůrka, 1970
- Basilia currani Guimarães, 1943
- Basilia daganiae Theodor, 1954
- Basilia dispar (Speiser, 1900)
- Basilia dubia Guimarães & Andretta, 1956
- Basilia dubiaquercus Graciolli & Dick, 2009
- Basilia dunni Curran, 1935
- Basilia echinata (Theodor, 1957)
- Basilia eileenae Scott, 1936
- Basilia endoi Mogi, 1979
- Basilia falcozi (Musgrave, 1925)
- Basilia ferrisi Schuurmans Stekhoven, 1931
- Basilia ferruginea Ribeiro
- Basilia flava (Weyenbergh, 1881)
- Basilia fletcheri (Scott, 1914)
- Basilia forcipata Ferris, 1924
- Basilia glabra Theodor, 1957
- Basilia guimaraesi (Schuurmans Stekhoven, 1951)
- Basilia halei (Musgrave, 1927)
- Basilia hamsmithi Maa, 1971
- Basilia handleyi Guimarães, 1966
- Basilia hispida Theodor, 1967
- Basilia hoffmannae Graciolli, Ramirez-Martínez & Reeves, 2021
- Basilia hughscotti Guimarães, 1946
- Basilia hystrix Farafonova, 1998
- Basilia indivisa Theodor, 1967
- Basilia insularis Graciolli, 2003
- Basilia italica Theodor, 1954
- Basilia japonica Theodor, 1973
- Basilia jellisoni Theodor & Peterson, 1965
- Basilia juquiensis Guimarães, 1946
- Basilia kerivoulae Theodor, 1973
- Basilia limbella Maa, 1986
- Basilia lindolphoi Graciolli, 2000
- Basilia longispinosa (Musgrave, 1927)
- Basilia louwerensi (Schuurmans Stekhoven, 1942)
- Basilia madagascarensis Theodor, 1957
- Basilia magnoculus (Schuurmans Stekhoven, 1942)
- Basilia major Theodor, 1967
- Basilia majuscula (Edwards, 1919)
- Basilia manu Guerrero, 1996
- Basilia mediterranea Hůrka, 1970
- Basilia meridionalis Theodor, 1956
- Basilia mimoni Theodor & Peterson, 1964
- Basilia mirandaribeiroi Guimarães, 1942
- Basilia mongolensis Theodor, 1966
- Basilia monocula Theodor, 1967
- Basilia multispinosa (Musgrave, 1927)
- Basilia musgravei Theodor, 1967
- Basilia myotis Curran, 1935
- Basilia nana Theodor, 1954
- Basilia nattererii (Kolenati, 1857)
- Basilia neamericana Schuurmans Stekhoven, 1951
- Basilia nodulata Maa, 1971
- Basilia nudior Hůrka, 1972
- Basilia ortizi Machado-Allison, 1964
- Basilia peali (Scott, 1925)
- Basilia pectinata Theodor, 1967
- Basilia peruvia Guimarães & Andretta, 1956
- Basilia peselefantis (Schuurmans Stekhoven, 1942)
- Basilia pizonychus Scott, 1939
- Basilia plaumanni Scott, 1940
- Basilia producta Maa, 1968
- Basilia pudibunda Schuurmans Stekhoven, 1941
- Basilia pumila (Scott, 1914)
- Basilia punctata Theodor, 1956
- Basilia quadrosae Graciolli & Moura, 2005
- Basilia robusta Theodor, 1956
- Basilia rondanii Guimarães & Andretta, 1956
- Basilia roylii (Westwood, 1835)
- Basilia rugosa Schuurmans Stekhoven, 1942
- Basilia ruiae Graciolli, 2003
- Basilia rybini Hůrka, 1969
- Basilia saccata Theodor, 1968
- Basilia seminuda Theodor, 1956
- Basilia sierraleonae Theodor, 1968
- Basilia silvae (Brèthes, 1913)
- Basilia speiseri (Ribeiro, 1907)
- Basilia tarda Maa, 1968
- Basilia techna Maa, 1971
- Basilia tenuispina Theodor, 1957
- Basilia tiptoni Guimarães, 1966
- Basilia transversa Maa, 1971
- Basilia traubi Maa, 1968
- Basilia travassosi Guimarães, 1938
- Basilia triseriata Theodor, 1967
- Basilia troughtoni (Musgrave, 1927)
- Basilia truncata Theodor, 1966
- Basilia truncatiformis Farafonova, 1998
- Basilia tuttlei Guimarães, 1972
- Basilia typhlops Guimarães, 1972
- Basilia victorianyanzae Theodor, 1968
- Basilia wenzeli Guimarães & Andretta, 1956
