= Camelus knoblochi =

Camelus knoblochi Temporal range: Mid - Late Pleistocene

Scientific classification
- Kingdom: Animalia
- Phylum: Chordata
- Class: Mammalia
- Order: Artiodactyla
- Family: Camelidae
- Genus: Camelus
- Species: †C. knoblochi

Binomial name
- †Camelus knoblochi Nehring, 1901

Synonyms
- Oreocamelus konoblochi; Eucamelus konoblochi

Extinct species of camel

Camelus knoblochi is an extinct species of camel that inhabited Eurasia during the Pleistocene epoch. One of the largest known camel species, its range spanned from Eastern Europe to Northern China.

== History of discovery ==
The earliest remains of the species were collected from the Volga region of Russia. The species was first recognised as distinct in an 1880 paper by I. S. Poliakov, but this was never published. The species was properly named in 1901 by Alfred Nehring, based on a fossil skull and lower jaws collected at the Luchka locality in the lower Volga, with the species name being after Alexander Knobloch, a factory owner in the nearby town of Sarepta interested in fossils who sent the skull in 1880 to the Zoological museum of St. Petersburg.

== Evolution ==
Sequenced genomes of C. knoblochi suggests that while the species is distinct from the living Camelus ferus (wild Bactrian camel) at the nuclear genomic level, its mitochondrial genome diversity is nested within that of the wild Bactrian camel, likely as a result of interbreeding with that species. While clearly a genetically distinct species in its own right which is more closely related to both the living wild Bactrian camel and the domestric Bactrian camel (Camelus bactrianus) than to the dromedary, it forms an effective polytomy with the two living Bactrian camel species likely due to interbreeding between the species as well as the three species diverging from each other around the same time. Genome analysis indicates that all 3 species had been genetically distinct from each other for at least 400,000 years. Cladogram after Yuan et al. 2024:

- Camelidae
  - Lamini (llamas)
  - Camelini
    - †Camelops
    - Camelus
      - Camelus dromedarius (dromedary)
      - - †Camelus knoblochi
        - Camelus ferus (wild Bactrian camel)
        - Camelus bactrianus (domestic Bactrian camel)

The earliest fossils of C. knoblochi date to the Middle Pleistocene.

== Description ==
Camelus knoblochi is one of the largest known species of genus Camelus, being considerably larger than the 3 living camel species. C. knoblochi has been estimated to reach around 3 metres (9.8 ft) tall and over 1,000 kilograms (2,200 lb) in weight. Its bones are more physically massive than those of living camels. The facial part of the skull is around 60% of the total length, somewhat elongate relative to other members of Camelus. The premaxillary bones are unfused. The metatarsals are slightly more elongate than the metacarpals on average.

== Distribution and ecology ==
Remains of Camelus knoblochi span from Ukraine in the west, southwards into the Caucasus and Central Asia, and across the Urals into Mongolia and into Northeast China. During the Late Pleistocene, its distribution was restricted from the Urals eastwards. The habitat of the species was primarily steppe, and to a lesser degree, forest steppe, rather than the desert environments inhabited by living Bactrian camel species. During the Late Pleistocene in Mongolia and northern China, the species coexisted alongside other megafauna like the woolly rhinoceros, Merck's rhinoceros, the elephant Palaeoloxodon, the buffalo Bubalus wansjocki. the giant deer Sinomegaceros ordosianus, Przewalski's horse, Asiatic wild asses, and argali. In the Volga region during Middle Pleistocene, it lived alongside Merck's rhinoceros, the elephant-sized rhinoceros Elasmotherium sibiricum (sometimes called the Siberian unicorn), steppe bison, the giant Irish elk, saiga antelope and red deer.

Isotopic analysis suggests that the species was a browser on C_{3} vegetation.

== Relationship with humans ==
At Tsagaan Agui Cave in Mongolia, a metacarpal of the species, dating to around 59-44,000 years Before Present, bears fracture marks as a result of human butchery like to access the marrow cavity, with bite marks showing that it was subsequently gnawed on by cave hyenas. Pleistocene cave art from Mongolia may also depict the species.

== Extinction ==
The latest remains of the species are from the Gobi Desert of Mongolia, where the species became extinct around the Last Glacial Maximum (around 26-19,500 years ago). Genetic analysis suggests that the species had already been in population decline for tens of thousands of years prior. The species likely became extinct as a result of unfavourable environmental change, including the aridification of the Gobi Desert around this time.

== See also ==
- Hybrid camel
