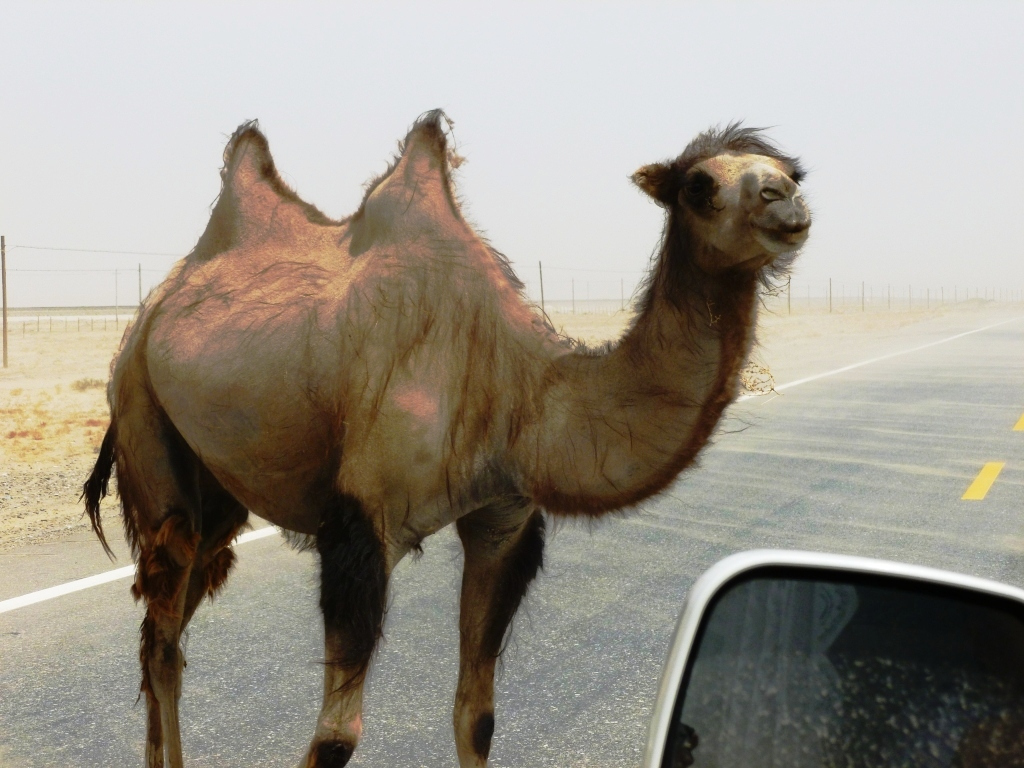
- At the Southern Silk Road between Yarkand and Khotan in Xinjiang, China

Conservation status
- Endangered (IUCN 3.1)
- CITES Appendix I

Scientific classification
- Kingdom: Animalia
- Phylum: Chordata
- Class: Mammalia
- Order: Artiodactyla
- Family: Camelidae
- Genus: Camelus
- Species: C. ferus

Binomial name
- Camelus ferus Przewalski, 1878
- Current range

Synonyms
- Species Level: Oreocamelus ferus; Eucamelus ferus; Subspecies Level: Camelus bactrianus ferus; Oreocamelus bactrianus ferus; Eucamelus bactrianus ferus

= Wild Bactrian camel =

Species of camel

The wild Bactrian camel (Camelus ferus) or simply the wild camel is an endangered species of camel endemic to Northwest China and southwestern Mongolia. It is closely related but not ancestral to the domestic Bactrian camel (Camelus bactrianus). Genetic studies have established it as a separate species which diverged from the Bactrian camel about 0.7–1.1 million years ago.

Currently, there are only around 950 wild Bactrian camels. Most live on the Lop Nur Wild Camel National Nature Reserve in China, and a smaller population lives in the Great Gobi A Strictly Protected Area in Mongolia. There are also populations in the Altun Shan Wild Camel Nature Reserve (1986) in Qakilik County, in the Aksai Annanba Nature Reserve (1992), and in Dunhuang Wanyaodun Nature Reserve (now Dunhuang Xihu Wild Camel Nature Reserve) contiguous with the reserve in Qakilik (2001) and a reserve in Mazongshan contiguous with the reserve in Mongolia, all in China.

== Name ==
The species was originally considered a subspecies of the domestic Bactrian camel and named C. bactrianus ferus in reference to the region of Bactria, a wider geopolitical area of ancient South-Central Asia where wild Bactrian camels (C. ferus) were once widespread. The name ferus means "feral" or "wild" and is a common subspecies name for the wild ancestors of previously described domestic species. Later research recognised the domestic C. bactrianus as a separate, sister species to the wild Bactrian, elevating the subspecies C. bactrianus ferus to full species level as C. ferus. Some authors advocate using the name 'wild camel' instead of 'wild Bactrian camel' to accurately reflect the species' distinct identity and geography.

== Description ==
Wild Bactrian camels have long, narrow slit-like nostrils, a double row of long thick eyelashes, and ears with hairs that provide protection against desert sandstorms. They have tough undivided soles with two large toes that spread wide apart, and a hard, calloused layer which enables them to walk on rough, hot, stony, or sandy terrain. Their coat undergoes a seasonal change, going from a thick, shaggy light brown or beige in winter to a thinner, wirier, darker brown coat in summer.

Like its close relative, the domesticated Bactrian camel, it is one of the few mammals able to eat snow to provide itself with liquids in the winter. While the legend that camels store water in their humps is a misconception, they are adapted to conserve water. However, long periods without water will still result in a deterioration of the animal's health.

=== Differences from domestic Bactrian camels ===
Wild Bactrian camels (Camelus ferus) appear similar to domesticated Bactrian camels (Camelus bactrianus) but the outstanding difference is genetic, with the two species having descended from two distinct ancestors.

There are several differences in size and shape between the two species. The wild Bactrian camel is slightly smaller than the domestic Bactrian camel and has been described as "lithe, and slender-legged, with very narrow feet and a body that looks laterally compressed." The humps of the wild Bactrian camel are smaller, lower, and more conical in shape than those of the domestic Bactrian camel. These humps may often be about half the size of those of a domesticated Bactrian camel. The wild Bactrian camel has a different shape of foot and a flatter skull (the Mongolian name for a wild Bactrian camel, havtagai, means "flat-head").

The wool of the wild Bactrian camel is always sandy coloured, and shorter and sparser than that of domestic Bactrian camels.

The wild Bactrian camel can also survive on water saltier than seawater, something which probably no other large mammal in the world can tolerate – including the domesticated Bactrian camel.

=== Behaviour ===
Wild Bactrian camels generally move in groups of up to 30 individuals, although 6 to 20 is more common depending on the amount of food available. They are fully migratory and widely scattered with a population density as low as 5 per 100 km^{2} (1 per 5,000 acres). They travel with a single adult male in the lead and assemble near water points where larger groups can also be seen. Their lifespan is about 40 years and they breed during winter with an overlap into the rainy season. Females produce offspring starting at age 5, and thereafter in a cycle of 2 years. Typically, wild Bactrian camels seen alone are postdispersal young individuals which have just reached sexual maturity.

== Distribution and habitat ==
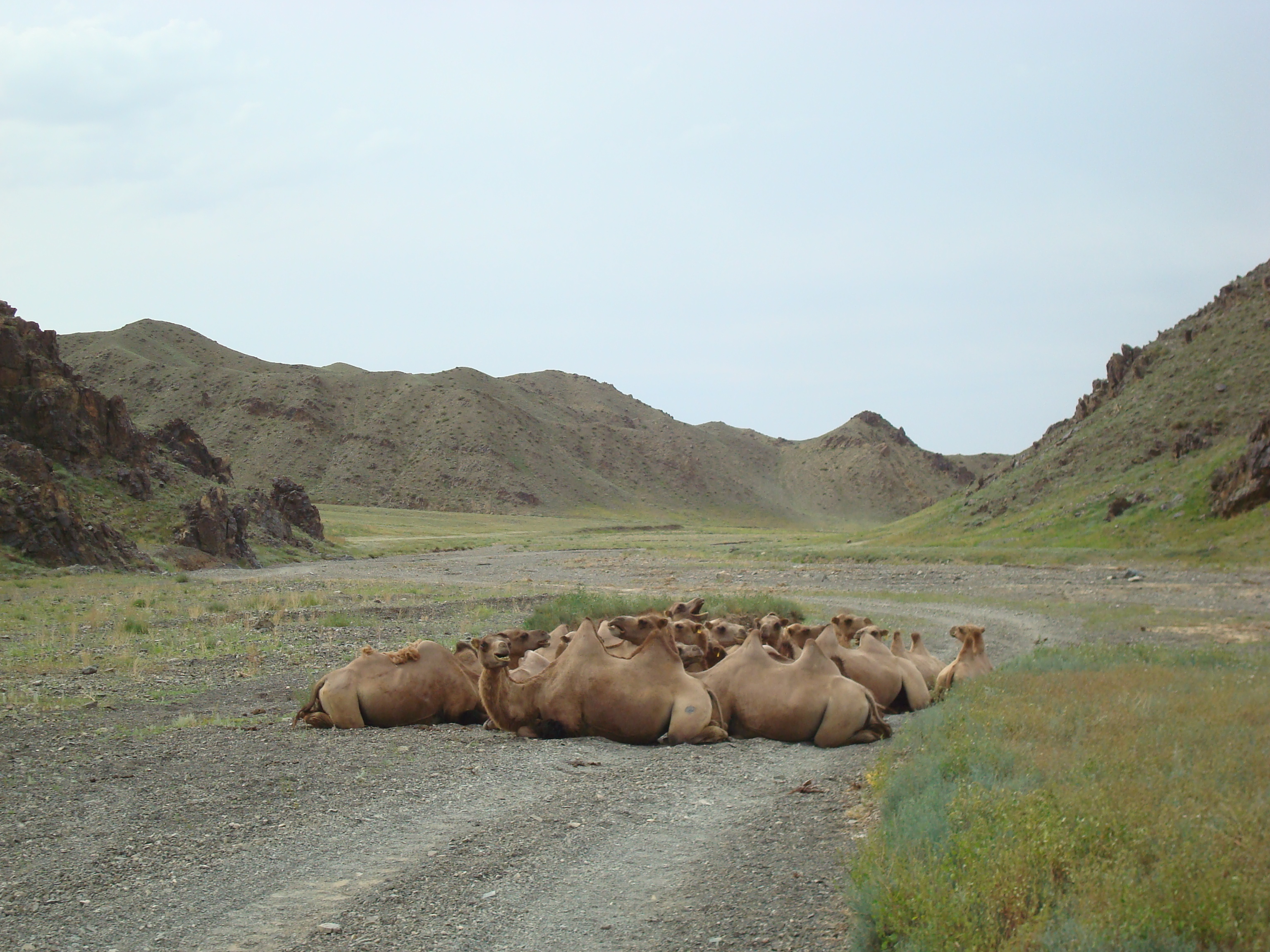
Group in Ömnögovi Province, Mongolia

Their habitat is in arid plains and hills where water sources are scarce and very little vegetation exists with shrubs as their main food source. These habitats have widely varying temperatures: the summer temperature ranges from 40 to 50 °C (104–122 °F) and winter temperature a low of −30 °C (−22 °F).

Wild Bactrian camels travel over long distances, seeking water in places close to mountains where springs are found, and hill slopes covered in snow provide some moisture in winter. The size of a herd may be as many as 100 camels but generally consists of 2–15 members in a group; this is reported to be due to arid environment and heavy poaching. The wild Bactrian camels are limited to three pockets in northwest China and some in southwest Mongolia. China spotted 39, and estimated that there were 600–650 camels in Altun Shan-Lop Nur reserves combined, in late 2018, with 48 spotted in Dunhuang reserve in 2018. At the Dunhuang and Mazongshan reserves, it had been estimated that one hundred camels exist per reserve, and for the Aksai reserve, it was estimated that there are nearly 200, according to an earlier estimation. In Mongolia, their population was about 800 in 2012.

In ancient times, wild Bactrian camels were seen from the great bend of the Yellow River extending west to the Inner Mongolian deserts and further to Northwest China and central Kazakhstan. In the 1800s, due to hunting for its meat and hide, its presence was noted in remote areas of the Taklamakan, Kumtag and Gobi deserts in China and Mongolia. In the 1920s, only remnant populations were recorded in Mongolia and China.

In 1964, China began testing nuclear weapons at Lop Nur, home to many of the wild Bactrian camels. The camels experienced no apparent ill effects from the radiation and continued to breed naturally. Instead, their habitat became a restricted military zone where human activity was kept to a minimum. After China signed the Comprehensive Test Ban Treaty in 1996, the camels were reclassified as an endangered species on the IUCN Red List. Since then, human incursions into the area have caused a sharp drop in the camel population. The extant habitat of the wild camels has been further disturbed by newly constructed roads and exploitation of oil fields. In addition, a border fence between China and Mongolia prevents the camels from migrating between the Chinese and Mongolian populations. A 2013 study confirmed at least 382 wild camels in China. The total population within the Chinese nature reserves is estimated to be between 640 and 740.

== Genetics ==
Genetic analysis suggests that the domestic Bactrian camel did not descend from the wild Bactrian camel, and that the two species split around 700,000 –1.1 million years ago. Ancient DNA analysis suggests that alongside the domestic Bactrian camel, the species is closely related to the extinct giant camel Camelus knoblochi, which went extinct around 20,000 years ago. While C. knoblochi is equidistant genetically from both living Bactrian camel species based on nuclear genomes, the mitochondrial genome diversity of C. knoblochi is nested within that of living wild Bactrian camels, suggesting interbreeding between the two species. Cladogram of relationships between living and extinct camels based on genomes after Yuan et al. 2024.

- Camelidae
  - Lamini (llamas)
  - Camelini
    - †Camelops
    - Camelus
      - Camelus dromedarius (dromedary)
      - - †Camelus knoblochi
        - Camelus ferus (wild Bactrian camel)
        - Camelus bactrianus (domestic Bactrian camel)

== Status ==
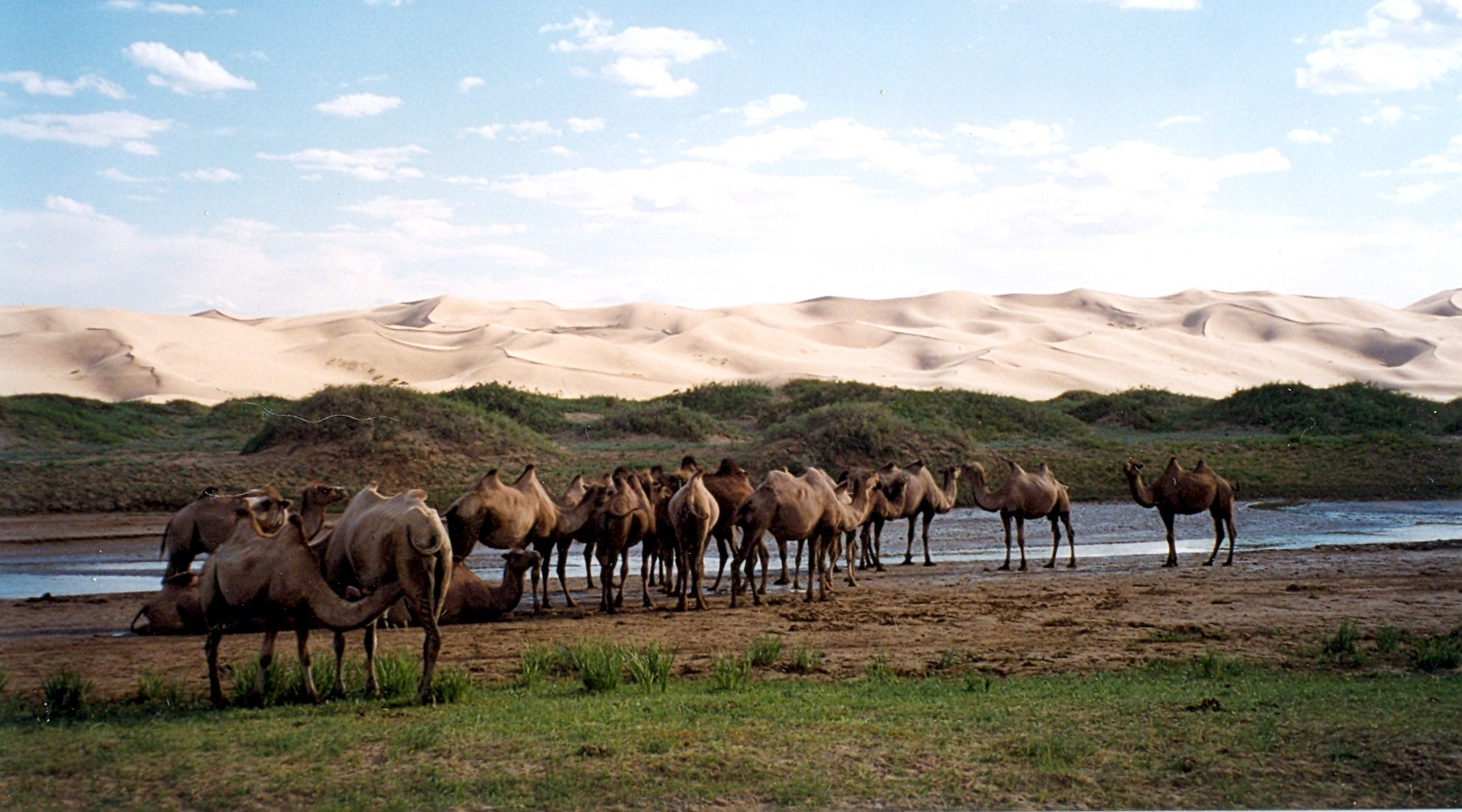
Wild Bactrian camels in the Gobi desert

The wild Bactrian camel has been classified as "critically endangered", according to the International Union for Conservation of Nature and Natural Resources (IUCN), since 2002; its status was deemed "critical" in the 1960s, gradually being elevated to "critically endangered". The UK-based Wild Camel Protection Foundation (WCPF) estimates that there are only about 950 individuals of the species left in the world, with its current population trend still decreasing. The London Zoological Society considers the wild bactrian to be the eighth most endangered large mammal in the world, and it is on the critically endangered list. The wild Bactrian camel was identified as one of the top ten "focal species" in 2007 by the Evolutionarily Distinct and Globally Endangered (EDGE) project, which prioritises unique and threatened species for conservation.^{[29]}

Observations made during five field expeditions starting in 1993 by John Hare and the WCPF suggest that the surviving populations may be facing an 80% decline within the next 30 years.

As of 2025 the IUCN downgraded the Wild Bactrian Camel from Critically Endangered to Endangered despite the decrease in its population.

=== Threats ===
Camels face various threats including poaching, climate change, being hunted, and human encroachment into their habitat. In the Gobi Reserve Area, 25 to 30 camels are reported to be poached every year, and about 20 in the Lop Nur Reserve. Hunters kill the camels by laying land mines in the salt water springs where the camels drink. Other threats include scarcity of access to water such as oases, attacks by wolves, hybridization with domestic Bactrians leading to a concern of a loss of genetically distinct populations or infertile individuals which could potentially ward off viable bulls from a large number of females during their lifetimes, toxic effluent releases from illegal mining, re-designation of wildlife areas as industrial zones, and sharing grazing areas with domestic animals. Due to increasing human populations, wild Bactrian camels that migrate in search of grazing land may compete for food and water sources with introduced domestic stock and are sometimes shot by farmers.

The only extant predators that regularly target wild Bactrian camels are wolves, which have been seen to pursue weaker and weather-battered camels as they try to reach oases. Due to increasingly dry conditions in the species' range, the numbers of cases of wolf predation on wild Bactrian camels at oases has reportedly increased.

=== Conservation ===
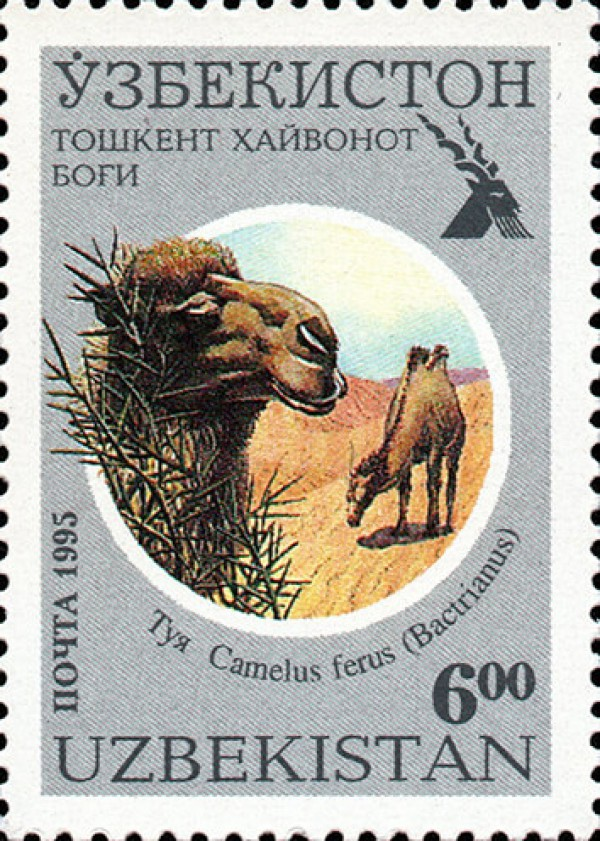
Wild Bactrian camel on an Uzbek stamp

Several actions have been initiated by the governments of China and Mongolia to conserve this species, including ecosystem-based management. Two programmes instituted in this respect are the Great Gobi Reserve A in Mongolia, set up in 1982; and the Lop Nur Wild Camel National Nature Reservein China, established in 2000.

The Wild Camel Protection Foundation, the only such charity of its kind, has as its main goal conservation of the wild in its natural desert environment to ensure that their status does not transition to Extinct in the Wild. The actions taken by the various organizations, motivated and supported by IUCN and WCPF, include establishment of more nature reserves (in China and Mongolia) for their conservation, and breeding them in captivity (as captive females may calve twice every two years, which may not happen in the wild) to prevent extinction. The captive breeding initiated by WCPF in 2003 is the Zakhyn-Us Sanctuary in Mongolia, where the initial programme of breeding the last non-hybridised herds of wild Bactrian camels has proved a success, with the birth of several viable calves.

The wild Bactrian camel was considered for introduction at Pleistocene Park in Northern Siberia, as a proxy for extinct Pleistocene camel species. If this had proved feasible, it would have increased their geographic range considerably, adding a safety margin to their survival. In 2021 however, domesticated Bactrian camels were introduced to the park instead.

== See also ==
- Dromedary
- Camelus bactrianus, domestic Bactrian camel
- List of animals with humps
