= Lop Nur Wild Camel National Nature Reserve =

Nature reserve in Xinjiang Province, China

- IUCN category V (protected landscape/seascape)
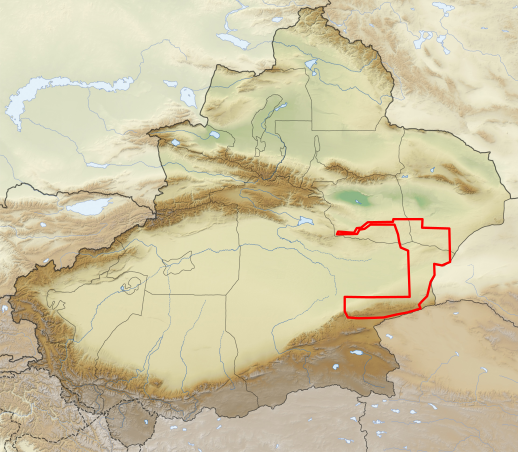
- Lop Nur Wild Camel Reserve boundaries (in red), southeastern Xinjiang

- Location within China
- Location: Xinjiang, China
- Nearest city: Turpan, Ruoqiang County
- Coordinates: 41°00′N 92°30′E
- Area: 6,700,000 ha (67,000 km^{2}; 26,000 mi^{2})
- Established: 1986
- Governing body: State Environment Protection Administration of China (SEPA)

Lop Nur Wild Camel National Nature Reserve (simplified Chinese: 罗布泊野骆驼国家级自然保护区; traditional Chinese: 羅布泊野駱駝國家級自然保護區; pinyin: Luóbùpō yě luòtuó guójiā jí zìrán bǎohù qū) protects one of the three remaining habitats of the Wild Bactrian camel, an endangered species. The reserve stretches around the north, east, and south of Lop Nur, a dry lake in a desert known as the "Sea of Death", and one of the most arid regions in the world. The reserve was established in 1986 by Xinjiang Uyghur Autonomous Region, and has been modified over the years. The reserve is under pressure from new roads in the area, development of mining interests, and illegal hunting.

The area was formerly used as China's nuclear test site. The nuclear testing caused no apparent ill effects on the camels, which continued to breed normally. After China signed the Comprehensive Test Ban Treaty in 1996, the camels were reclassified as an endangered species. Since then, human incursions into the area have caused a sharp drop in the camel population.

== Topography ==
The reserve is situated in an uninhabited, arid desert of mountains and valleys. The Tarim Basin is to the west, the Altyn-Tagh mountains form a southern barrier, and the Karum Tagh range (an extension of the Tian Shan) mountains are to the north. A corridor of sand dunes run north–south on the eastern edge of the site, protecting the camels from eastern influences, as does the dry lake bed of Lop Nur to the west. The Altun Shan National Nature Reserve borders Lop Nur to the southwest.

== Climate and ecoregion ==
The climate of the reserve has been described as "hostile". Extreme aridity, extreme heat in summer, extreme cold in winter, and abrasive sandstorms create an environment that few plants or animals are adapted to survive. The climate classification is Cold desert climate" (Köppen climate classification "BWk" ). Parts of the area receive an average of only 10–20 mm of precipitation per year, with an average 4,000 mm/year evaporation.

The Lop Nur Reserve is in the east of the Taklamakan Desert ecoregion. Because this region is surrounded by mountains, it is cut off from the Asian monsoon and from Arctic air masses. The result is one of the driest place on earth.

== Flora and fauna ==
Due to the aridity and salinity of the soil, vegetation cover is sparse, varying from 6% in the Kuruk Tagh mountains, up to 30% on flood plains of the Airgin mountains in the south. Halophytes predominate. The north slope of the Arjin Mountains in the south, and the Aqike Valley below, have more vegetation cover and provide the best habitat for the wild camels.

The wild camel population of the reserve was estimated at 638 in 2013. Virtually all of them are found in the southeastern third of the area, although they do roam outside the boundaries. The Aqike Valley appears to be the prime breeding ground, as it benefits from more extensive vegetation, snow melt from the mountains, and an underground water table that approaches 2 meters from the surface. The camels have adapted to drinking the salt water of the desert.

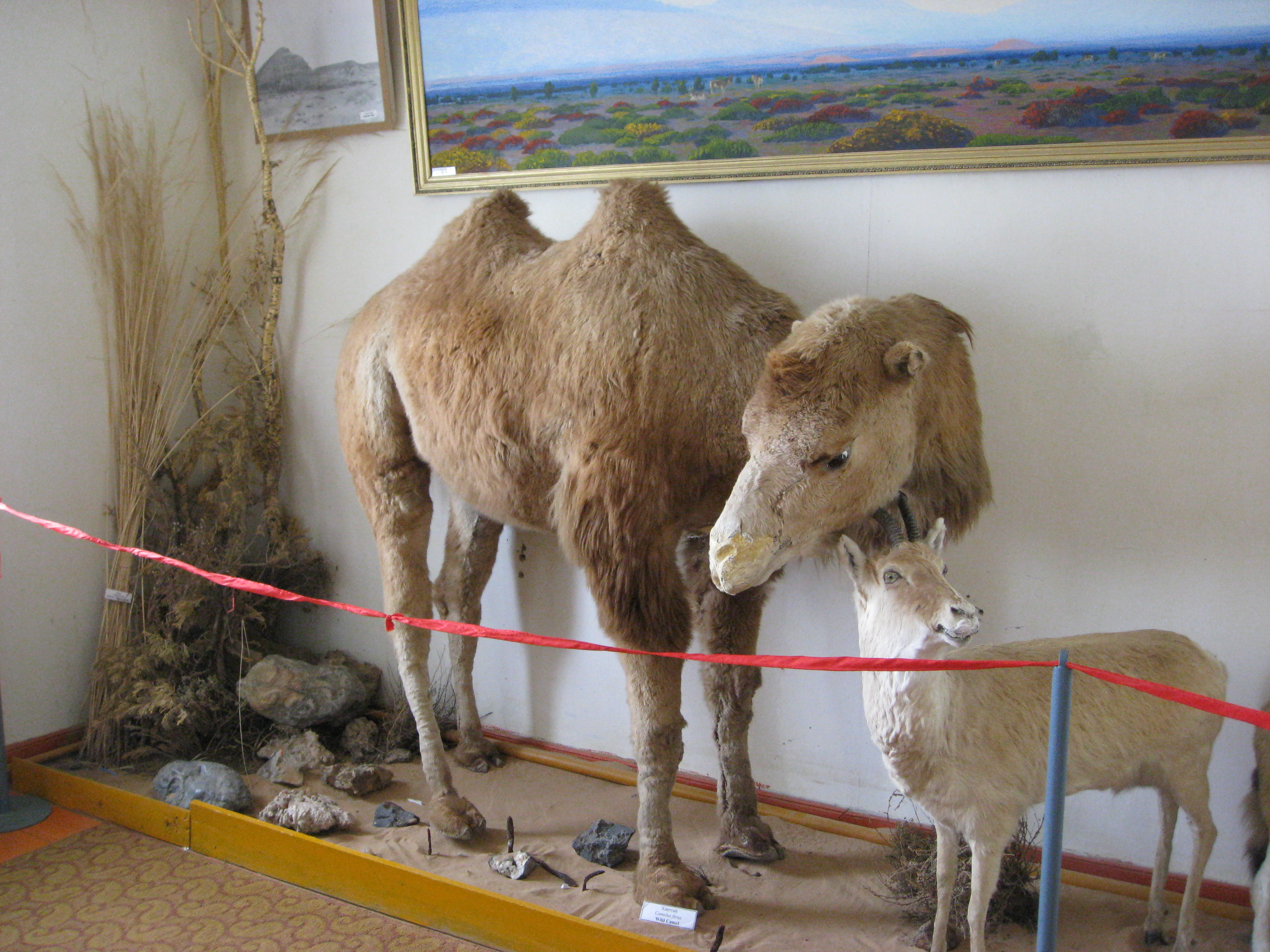
Stuffed Wild Bactrian Camel

== Reserve management ==
In recent years, professional management has been brought to the reserve, with patrols and guard checkpoints, scientific surveys, public education initiatives, and has channeled water from the mountains to prime breeding areas. The population of wild camels appears to be recovering. Poaching is recorded as on the decline, and there are no domesticated camels in the reserve.
