= Nycteribia =

Scientific classification
- Kingdom: Animalia
- Phylum: Arthropoda
- Clade: Pancrustacea
- Class: Insecta
- Order: Diptera
- Family: Nycteribiidae
- Subfamily: Nycteribiinae
- Genus: Nycteribia; Latreille, 1796

Genus of flies

Nycteribia is genus of insects within the family Nycteribiidae, comprising approximately 35 species, that exclusively parasitize the blood of bats.

== Description ==
Nycteribia do not have wings, but possess halteres and atrophied flight muscles, suggesting history of flight. Their bodies are divided into a flattened and shielded thorax, with six, tri-segmented, clawed appendages, and an ovular lower abdomen. Their heads are more narrow than other Hippoboscidae, which are attached dorsally to the anterior end of the thorax when at rest and when feeding, the head rotates in a half circle and protrudes forward to attach to the host.

The Nycteribia's head is highly adapted from other Hippoboscidae; first, the eyes are primarily absent, or if present, reduced to a maximum of two eye facets. The antennae are reminiscent of other Hippoboscidae, composed of the a fused outer pedicle, with an inner flagellum. The proboscis (nose-like feeding structure) of the Nycteribia are also analogous to other Hippoboscidae, with the exception of the tormae, which are separately attached on the sides of the fronto-clypeus. To attach to the host, Nycteribia are covered in ctenidia, or small combs, which allow the insect to stick to the outer layer of fur, preventing them from being removed via grooming. The appendages of Nycteribia end in tarsal claws, which also allow for grasping and lateral movement on a host.

The species shows high host diet specificity. Specifically, frugivorous bat flies do not parasitize on animalivorous or insectivorous bat species, and a low number of microbat, the typically carnivorous bats, parasite species (Nycteribia stylidiopsis, Penicillidia fulvida, and (P. leptothrinax) are seen to exhibit general host infection, while still exhibiting specificity for host preference.

== Generalized life-cycle ==
The life-cycle of Basilia hispida, which follows typical life cycle of Nycteribia as compared with five other species, is analogous across the genus. Larval fertilization and development in Nycteribia occurs internally within the mother. Larvae, also called prepupae, are sustained within the mother through their first two larval molts by blood meals fed through the accessory glands. On the third molt they are deposited, named larviposition, through the female onto the host. The prepupae immediately pupate, which takes approximately 3-4 weeks, before hatching as fully mature adults. The adult life stage typically lasts 30-60 days and adults typically are produced in equal numbers of males and females. Nycteribia generally experience the highest postembryonic mortality in the adult phase, which is due to predation. Female Nycteribia, on average, are found to live longer than males.
