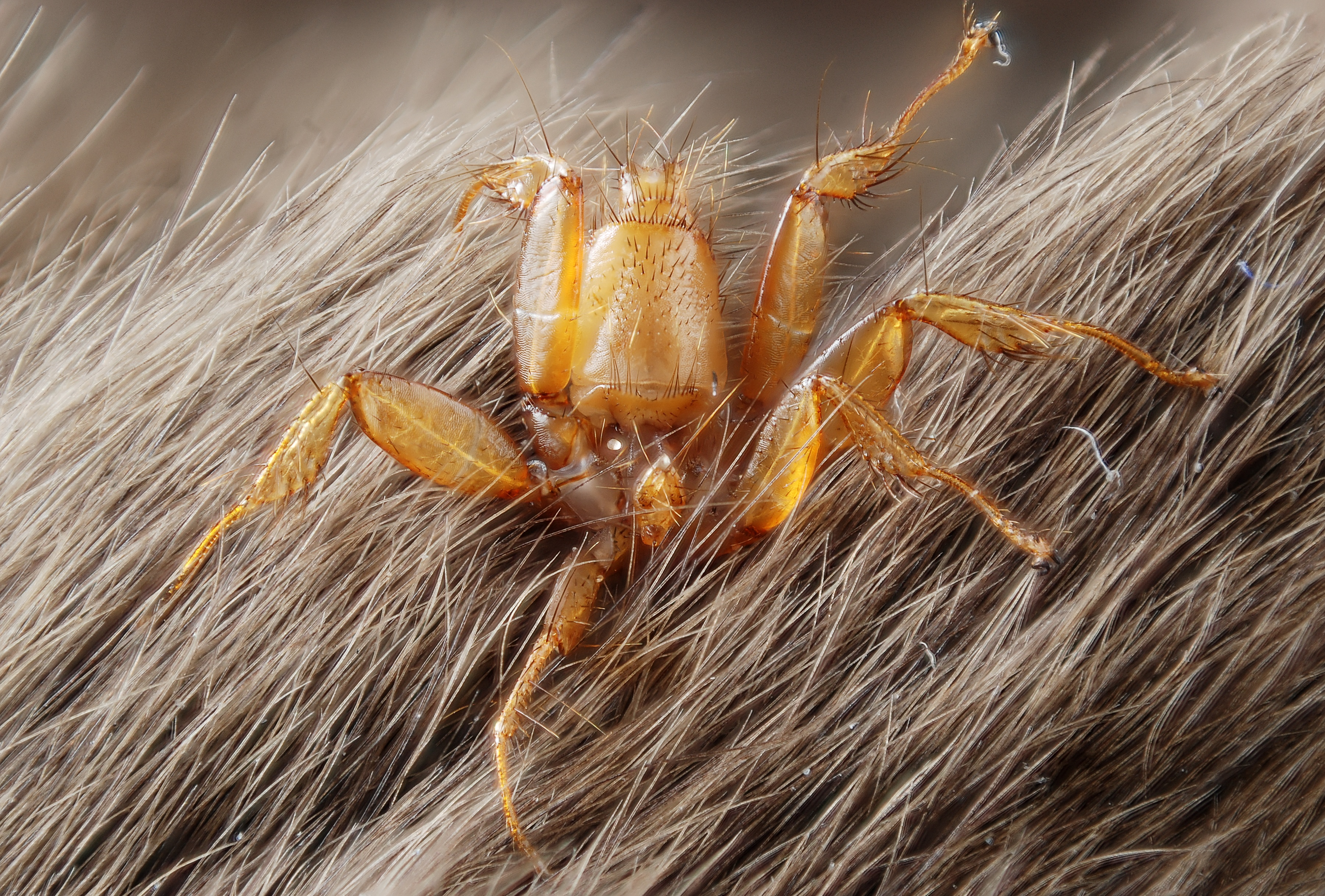

Scientific classification
- Kingdom: Animalia
- Phylum: Arthropoda
- Clade: Pancrustacea
- Class: Insecta
- Order: Diptera
- Family: Nycteribiidae; Samouelle 1819

Subfamilies
- Three; see text

= Nycteribiidae =

Family of flies

Nycteribiidae is a family of the true fly superfamily Hippoboscoidea. Together with their close relatives the Streblidae, they are known as "bat flies". As the Streblidae do not seem to be a monophyletic group, it is conceivable that bat flies cannot be united into a single family.

They are flattened, spiderlike flies without eyes or wings, bearing very little resemblance to other Dipterans. These flies are seldom encountered by general collectors, as both males and females are parasites, living on and rarely leaving the body of their hosts and taking blood meals. Most species are highly host-specific. Female bat flies often must leave their hosts to breed and lay eggs, but do not leave their bats' immediate habitat. The family is primarily found in the Old World tropics; a few of the 274 known species occur in the Neotropics and Europe.

== General ==
- Subfamily Archinycteribiinae Maa, 1975

- Archinycteribia Speiser, 1901

- Subfamily Cyclopodiinae Maa, 1965

- Cyclopodia Kolenati, 1863
- Dipseliopoda Theodor, 1955
- Eucampsipoda Kolenati, 1857
- Leptocyclopodia Theodor, 1959

- Subfamily Nycteribiinae Westwood, 1835

- Basilia Miranda Ribeiro, 1903
- Hershkovitzia Guimarães & d'Andretta, 1956
- Nycteribia Latreille, 1796
- Penicillidia Kolenati, 1863
- Phthiridium Hermann, 1804
- Stereomyia Theodor, 1967
- Stylidia Westwood, 1840

== Morphology ==
One of the key morphological features of Nycteribiidae is their highly reduced compound eyes. Many species of Nycteribiidae contain no visible eyes or contain only rudimentary eye spots. None of the species contains wings. They have backward folded legs that resemble those of spiders and a dorsally inserted head.
