= Friedrich August Rudolph Kolenati =

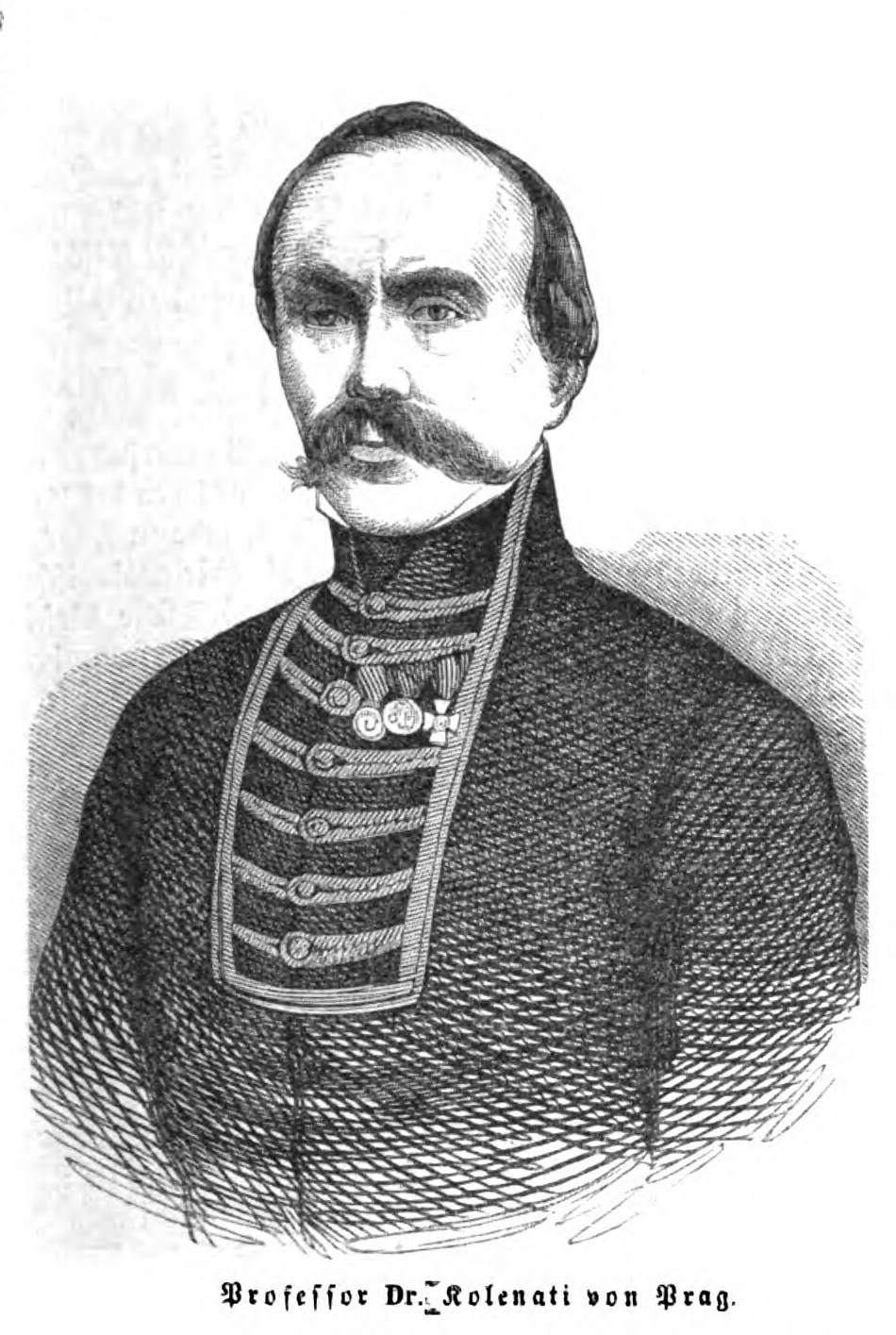
Professor Kolenati, c. 1849

Friedrich August (Anton) Rudolph Kolenati (12 September 1812 – 17 July 1864) was a botanist and zoologist active primarily in Prague and Brno in the Austrian Empire. He contributed to studies on bats, bat parasites, insects and arachnids.

== Life and work ==
Kolenati was born in Prague where he completed elementary school and high school, then after graduation from the Medical Faculty of Charles University in 1836 as a student of the natural sciences, especially botany and entomology, he continued as an assistant in botany. In 1842 he moved to Russia as an assistant in zoology at the St Petersburg Academy of Sciences. From 1842 to 1845 he participated in explorations of the Caucasus, ranging from the Azov Sea to Nagorno-Karabakh, and later conducted a survey of the lower Don River.

In 1845 Kolenati returned to Prague, where he was named an Associate Professor of Natural History. In 1848 he played an active part in the revolutionary events of the time, for which he was subsequently arrested. After his release from prison, he gave lectures in mineralogy and zoology at the Prague Polytechnic Institute and worked as a professor of natural history at the Lesser gymnasium. In 1848 he co-founded the Lotos Science Association, and was appointed full professor of natural science and technology at the Polytechnic Institute at Brno. In this department during his tenure significantly expanded its natural history collections, especially its mineralogical collections. He also became an early mentor of Gregor Mendel. He died while on a research trip to Praděd and is buried in Little Morávka.

Kolenati was a member of the Royal Czech Society of Sciences, published more than 50 entomological works, and was also considered an expert on bats. His collection of beetles from the first half of the 19th century has become one of the foundations of the National Museum's entomological collection in Prague.

== Bibliography ==
- Kolenati, F. A.: 1845, [1. Titelblatt:] Meletemata Entomologica. Fasc. I. [2. Titelblatt:] Insecta Caucasi cum distributione geographica. Coleopterorum Pentamera carnivora. Bedrich (= Friedrich) Anton Kolenati Petropoli, Sumtibus Imperialis Academiae Scientiarum: 2 Titelbl. + 1 – 88, col. Taf. I – II, 1845. (Horn, W. Misc. ent. Band 3, Arbeit 15).
- Kolenati, F. A.: 1848, Genera et species Trichopterorum. 1. Heteropalpoidea, Pragae, pp ??
- Kolenati, F. A.: 1857, Synopsis Prodroma der Nycteribien. Wiener Entomol. Monatschr., 1, 61 – 62.
- Kolenati, F. A.: 1858, Die Bereisung Hocharmeniens und Elisabethopols, der Schekinschen Provinzund des Kasbek im Central – Kaukasus, Dresden: Kuntze, VI, 289 pp.
- Kolenati, F. A.: 1860, Die larve von Elmis maugetii Latr. Wiener entom. Monatschrift, 1, 88 – 89.
- Kolenati, F. A.: 1863, Beiträge zur Kenntniss der Phthirio – Myiarien. Horae Soc. Entomol. Ross., 2, 9 – 109.
