= Miroslav Bobek =

Czech zoologist

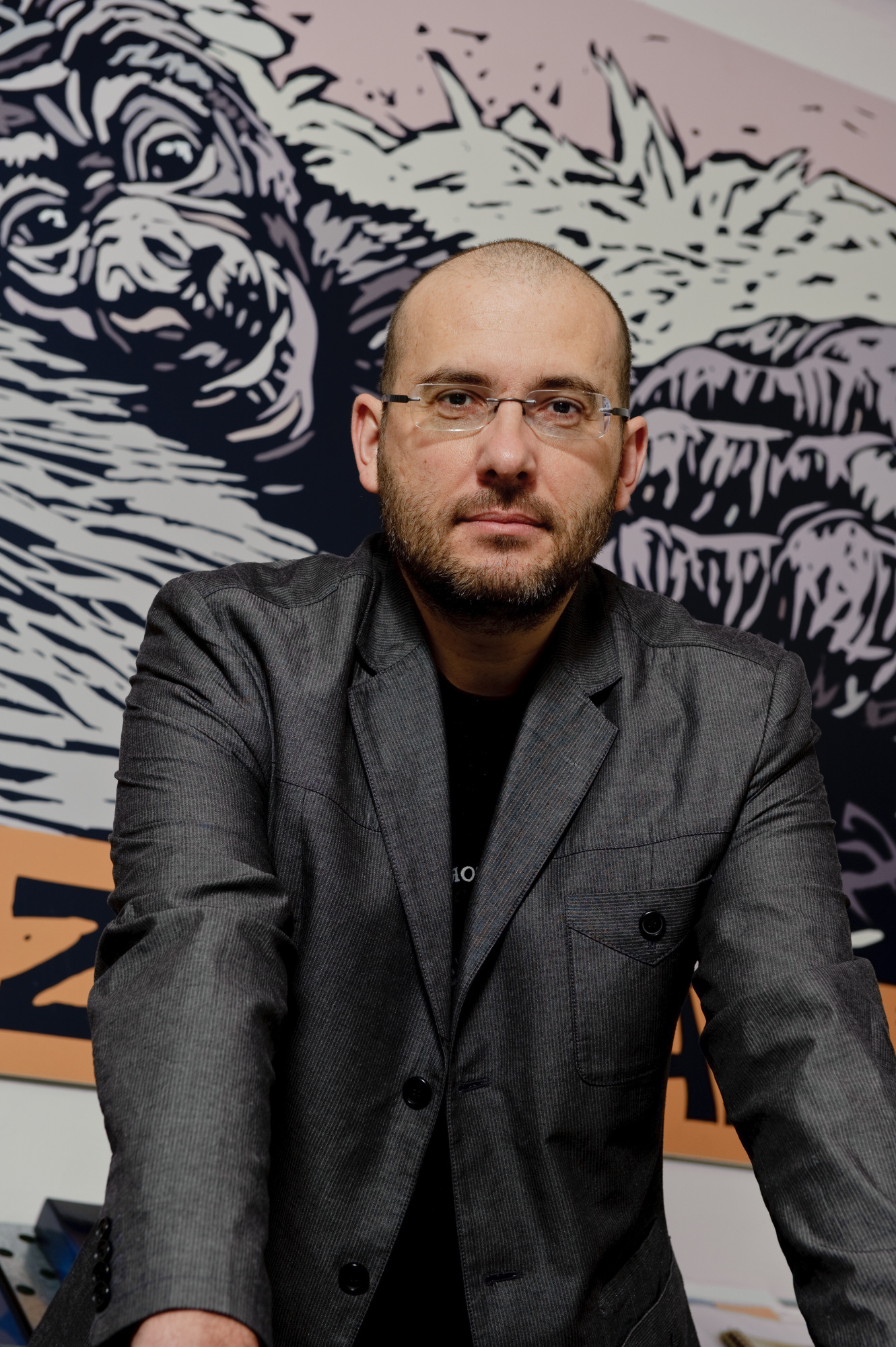
- Miroslav Bobek in 2022
- Born: 10 February 1967 (age 59); Mladá Boleslav, Czechoslovakia
- Education: Charles University
- Occupations: writer, journalist, manager and zoologist
- Known for: Prague Zoo; The Revealed
- Notable work: Gorilla Fairy Tales (2009), Vultures in the Continental Hotel (2021), The Red-haired Librarian (2022)
- Title: Mgr.
- Awards: Order of the Polar Star (Mongolia) (2022)

Signature
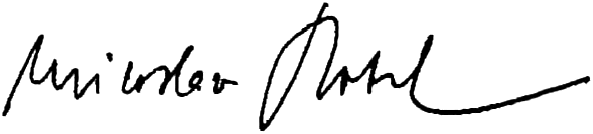

Miroslav Bobek (born 10 February 1967) is a Czech natural scientist and manager, from 2010 to 2025 he was the director of Prague Zoo and from 2014 to 2016 he was also president of the Union of Czech and Slovak Zoos. He worked for a long time in Czech Radio, where he became famous for his show "Revealed", in which he observed the life of the gorillas at Prague Zoo in the form of a reality show.

== Curriculum vitae ==
Miroslav Bobek studied zoology at the Faculty of Science, Charles University in Prague. From 1993 to 2009 he worked for Czech Radio, where he initially worked as an editor and reporter. He was primarily involved in popularising science. In 1997, he was the head of the Rainbow Bridge project, which ensured broadcasting during the floods in Moravia.

From 1998 to 2000 he was editor-in-chief of the radio station Prague. In 2000 he founded Czech Radio 8 (Online) and became its editor-in-chief. In 2005, he drew up the construction of the popular-science radio station Leonardo, of which he was the director until 2009. At the end of 2009 he won the selection procedure for the director of Prague Zoo and took over this function on 1 January 2010. In June 2014 he was elected president of the Union of Czech and Slovak Zoos (UCSZOO). He held this position until 2016.

Miroslav Bobek is married to Klára, they have a son, Kryštof, and a daughter, Markéta.

== Activities ==
=== Projects ===
In 1994, Miroslav Bobek initiated the African Odyssey project, which he subsequently ran for many years. It involved monitoring the migration of black storks from the Czech Republic to their African wintering grounds and back to Bohemia using satellite and VHF telemetry. The storks were fitted with “backpacks” containing radios and satellite telemetry. He led several expeditions to Africa, from where he made hundreds of live broadcasts. He also played a leading role in the New Odyssey project looking at stork migration in Asia, which was launched in 2002 and was loosely linked to the African Odyssey project.

Afterwards, he organised a two-year (2001–2002) on-line transmission of the falcons at the Tyn Church in Prague as well as the Czech Radio building on Vinohradská Street. The project was called Falcons in the Heart of the City and even caught live hatchings.

Among the other projects he has participated in are Call for the Day, which introduced various instances of birdsong by means of an audio CD and Czech Radio's Internet, or Via Pontica which monitored the migration of birds of prey in eastern Turkey.

=== The Revealed ===
Miroslav Bobek became the author and head of The Revealed project which had the subtitle "A Slightly Different Reality Show" (2005–2008). It was one of Czech Radio's most prominent multimedia projects. The project began with the launch of an online video broadcast from the gorilla pavilion at Prague Zoo and became a regular radio and television show in autumn 2005. Czech Radio received a "Wild Oscar" for it at the prestigious Wildscreen Festival in Bristol and the Seal of Comenius EduMedia in Berlin. The main aim was to compare gorillas’ behaviour with that of humans, whilst conveying some relevant information about apes and thus contributing to their conservation. The project partly parodied the reality shows that were being broadcast at that time on commercial television (e.g. Big Brother or VyVolení). Tereza Šefrnová and Radomír Šofr also took part in the screenplay for The Revealed.

Based on this project, Tereza Šefrnová and Miroslav Bobek wrote a book of fairy tales for children Moja and Páv (2006). Subsequently Bobek wrote the second volume Moja, Tatu and the Biting Midges (2009), again with the participation of the actress Tereza Šefrnová. The books were also published in English and French for African children. Tereza Šefrnová narrated them in Czech for the Leonardo show on Czech Radio, she was then replaced by singer Lucie Bílá.

Together with Martin Smrček he wrote a book of the same name about The Revealed project.

== Director of Prague Zoo ==
After Petr Fejk left, Miroslav Bobek applied for the post of the director of Prague Zoo. He advanced to the final round, together with the economist Miroslav Zámečník and former head of news at TV Nova, Jan Vávra. The committee for the selection of the new director recommended Miroslav Bobek and Prague City Council appointed him to this position. The ceremonial inauguration took place on December 22, 2009 at the zoo. At the time he saw his main task to be maintaining Prague Zoo’s success. He wanted to use modern technology in the zoo, including the Internet, thus being able to present the animals more in the context of their natural environment. A particularly big task he set himself was the construction of a new pavilion for the elephants and hippos.

Under his leadership the zoo managed to break its record for annual attendance, it increased its level of economic self-sufficiency, deepened its breeding successes and increased its efforts in the conservation of endangered species. One of the things Prague Zoo did was to cooperate with the Czech Army in transporting Przewalski's horses to Mongolia (The Return of the Wild Horses from 2011) and it actively engaged in the conservation of western gorillas in Africa (in particular by means of The Wandering Bus project since 2013).

During his time at Prague Zoo they have built new grounds for the elephants (Elephant Valley), a hippo house, an aquarium for giant salamanders, the Bororo Reserve and Rákos' Parrot house for mainly exotic birds, new gorilla house called The Dja Reserve, Mongolian Gobi exhibit or Ball's Pyramid exhibit with breeding facility for the critically endangered Lord Howe Island stick insect. A new home for polar bears, the Arctic exhibit, is in construction. The Feline and Reptile House has been reconstructed, Gočár's houses have been restored and, after decades of neglect, the Zakázanka trail has reopened. He considers the acquisition of elephants from Sri Lanka to be a great success.

On 27 September 2025, journalists from Seznam Zprávy and Deník N published articles, in which current and former employees of the Prague Zoo described long-time bossing and bullying by Bobek and his secretary Renata Švejdová. A day later, in interview with Seznam Zprávy, Bobek admitted that he yelled at employees, but denied allegations of bossing and bullying. Former employees published an on-line petition in which they demand independent investigation and Bobek's dismissal. On 30 September 2025, Bobek resigned as director and denied allegations again.

== Publications ==
Since 2012, Miroslav Bobek has been publishing anthologies of the columns and notes he regularly contributes to major news media as the director of Prague Zoo.

Nature writing

- Bobky od Bobka ("Bobbles from Bobek: from the Zoo Director's Diary"; 2012)
- Žirafa na pondělí ("A Giraffe for Monday: from the Zoo Director's Diary"; 2014)
- Trojský lev ("Trojan Lion: from the Zoo Director's Diary"; 2016)
- Zoopisník Miroslava Bobka (2018)
- Vultures in the Continental Hotel (2021) (Supi v hotelu Continental, 2020)
- The Red-haired Librarian (2022) (Ryšavý knihovník, 2022)
- Breakfast with Her Excellency and Other Notes of a Zoo Director (2025) (Snídaně s Její Excelencí, 2024)

Books for children

- Moja a páv: Gorilí pohádky ("Moja and the Peacock", with Tereza Šefrnová; 2006)
- Proč nehladit ježka: gorilí říkanky ("Don’t Stroke the Hedgehog: Gorilla Rhymes"; 2007)
- Gorilla Fairy Tales (with Tereza Šefrnová; 2009) (Moja, Tatu a tiplíci: Gorilí pohádky; 2008)

Photographic publications

- Ztichlá zoo ("Quiet Zoo", collective of authors; 2021)

== Awards ==
In 2008 he received an honorary Vojtěch Náprstek medal for popularising science. It was awarded by the Academy of Sciences of the Czech Republic, mainly for the Revealed and African Odyssey projects. In 2014 he was awarded the Medal of Friendship and in 2022 the Order of the Polar Star by the Mongolian President. In 2025, he received the Order of Mykola Leontovych from the Mykolaiv Zoo in Ukraine. Named after the founder of the zoo, the award is given for achievements in the development of zoological gardens.
