= Zdeněk Veselovský =

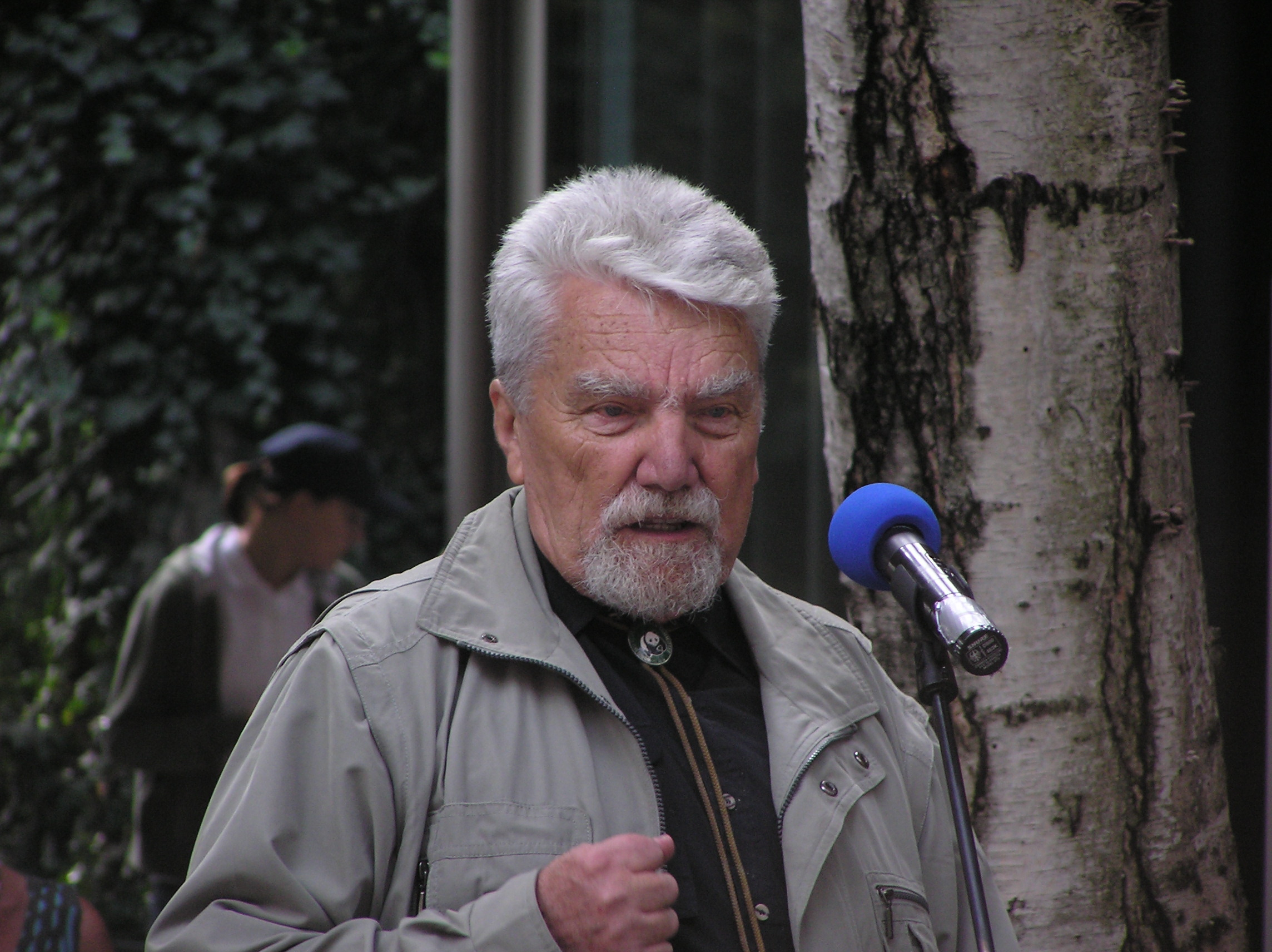
Zdeněk Veselovský in 2006

Zdeněk Veselovský (26 August 1928 – 24 November 2006) was one of the most important Czech zoologists of the 20th century, founder of Czech ethology, director of the Prague Zoo (1959-1988) and the president of the International Union of Directors of Zoological Gardens (1971-1975) (renamed in 2000 to World Association of Zoos and Aquariums) He was born in Jaroměř and died in 2006, aged 78, in Prague. In November 2008, he received the Minister of the Environment Award in memoriam "for his lifelong work in the field of zoology and ethology and for his admirable activity in activities involved in the conservation of animal species and the promotion of zoos as educational institutions."

== Early life ==
Zdeněk Veselovský was born in Jaroměř on August 26, 1928, after graduating from the Faculty of Science of Charles University in Prague, he worked here in 1952–1959 as a university assistant. While still a university student, he worked for a year as a zoological assistant to the then director Cyril Purkyně, and in 1959 he was appointed director. He was a student of the later Nobel Prize winner Konrad Lorenz.

== Career ==
In 1964 he was elected Secretary-General of this organization of the International Union of Directors of Zoological Gardens (IUDZG). He served as a vice president from 1967 to 1971 and as a president from 1971 to 1975. He served as a director of the Prague Zoo until 1988. He later became a professor of zoology at the Faculty of Biology of the University of South Bohemia in České Budějovice, where he lectured until his death in 2006. He also lectured externally at the department of zoology of the Faculty of Science at Charles University.

== Publications ==
- The Hunter Farms on the Water, SZN, 1954
- Animal World. Part I, Mammals, SNDK, 1960 - together with Jan Hanzák
- Ancient Animals, Mladá fronta, 1964
- Trip to the Tertiary, Mladá fronta, 1969; 2nd extended and revised edition, 1986
- Prague Zoo: Can You Look at Animals ?, Prague: Zoological Garden, 1971
- It's Just Animals !, Mladá fronta, 1974
- Voices of the Jungle, Orbis, 1976
- Elephants and Their Relatives, SZN, 1977
- Everyday day at the Prague Zoo, Albatros, 1983
- Penguins, SZN, 1984
- Birds and Water, Academia, 1987
- To the Springs of the Orinoco, Panorama, 1988
- Chimpanzee, Panorama, 1991, ISBN 80-7038-081-0 Do
- We Behave Like Animals ?, Panorama, 1992, ISBN 80-7038-240-6
- Lynx, Panorama, Ministry of the Environment of the Czech Republic, 1992, ISBN
- 80-7038-294 -5
- Conquest of Troy or Not Only Elephants Have a Memory, ISV, 1995, ISBN 80-85866-10-2
- Tiger, Aventinum, 1997, ISBN 80-7151-018-1
- Animal Kingdom, Aventinum, 1998, ISBN 80-7151-071- 8
- Otter, Aventinum, Třeboň Otter Foundation, 1998, ISBN 80-7151-063-7
- Man and Animal, Academia, 2000, ISBN 80-200-0756-3
- General Ornithology, Academia, 2001, ISBN 80-200-0857- 8
- Ethology. Animal Behavior Biology., Academia, 2005, ISBN 80-200-1331-8
