= The Revealed =

Czech nature documentary

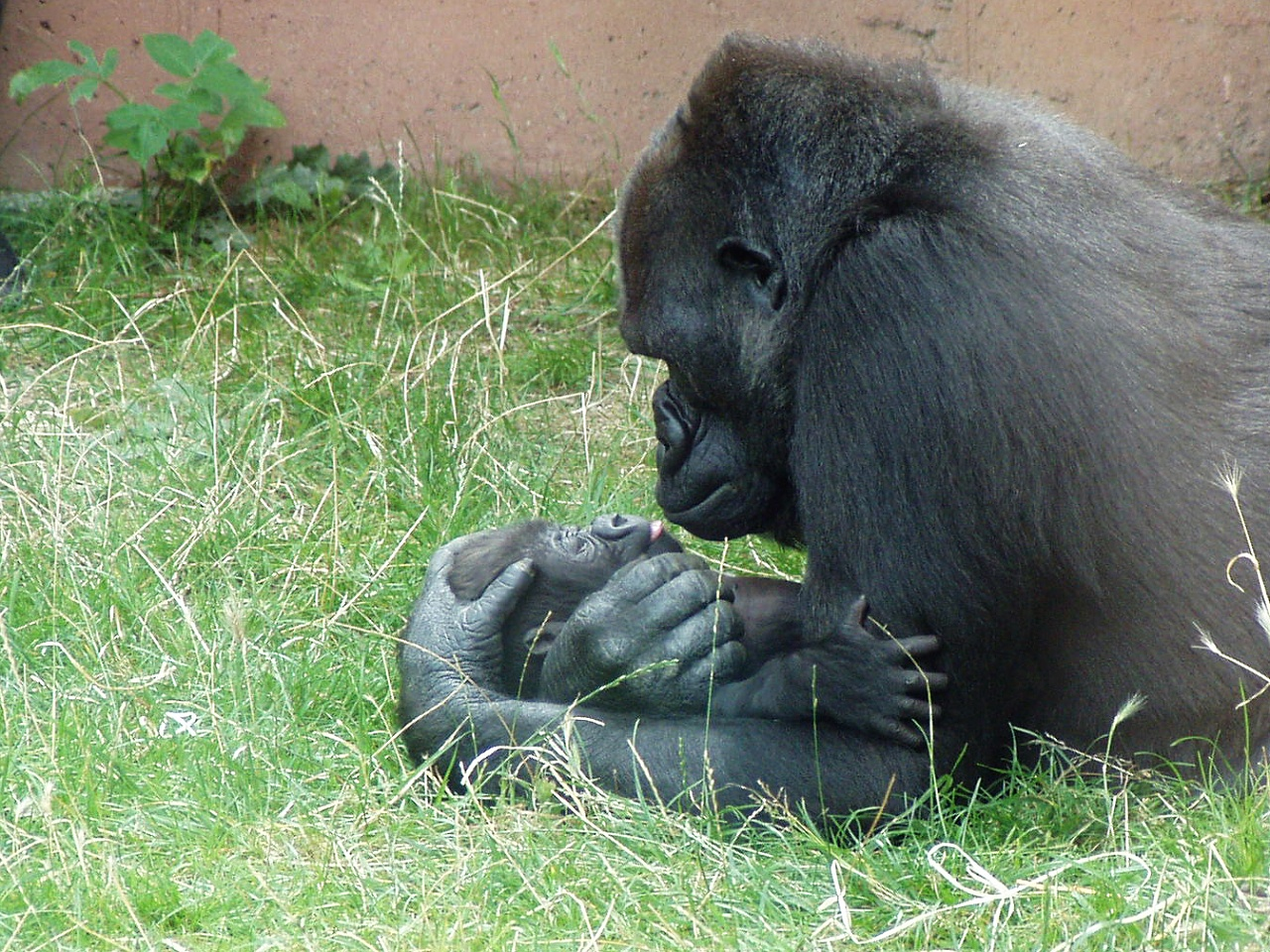
Kijivu and Tatu

The Revealed: A slightly different reality show is a nature documentary webcast, following the lives of western lowland gorillas living in Prague Zoo, Czech Republic. It is a joint project of Czech Radio, Prague Zoo and telecommunication company Visual Connection. Presented as a parody of human reality television, the objective of the broadcast is to show the behaviour of gorillas living in captivity, and the gorillas have been seen eating, sleeping, socialising, solving brain-teasers and giving birth.

== History ==
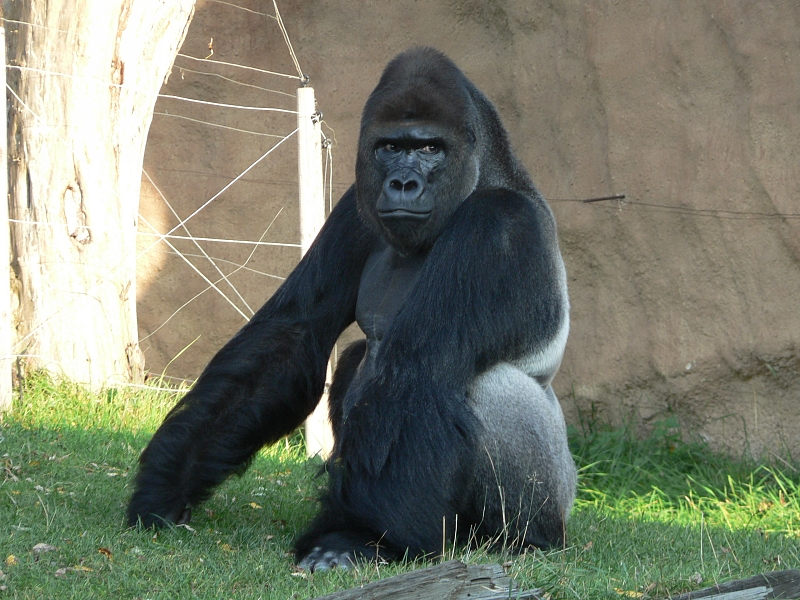
Richard

The project was created by Miroslav Bobek, a producer at Czech Radio, and started broadcasting on 7 November 2005. Czech Radio installed 16 cameras in the gorilla pavilion in Prague Zoo and live webcasts were placed on the project's website, broadcasting 24 hours a day. Viewers were able to vote for their favourite gorilla via SMS. On 15 January 2006 the winner, 15-year-old male Richard, won 12 melons, a pun on Czech slang that uses the word melons instead of millions when speaking about large sums of money.

The show was originally intended to last for three months, but it became so popular that its producers decided to continue broadcasting, and it is still running.

== Gorillas ==
- Richard: male, * 9 November 1991 in Frankfurt Zoological Garden
- Kamba (Liana): female, * 1972 in Africa
- Shinda (Victoria): female, * 14 June 1991 in Apenheul
- Kijivu (Grey): female, * 18 March 1993 in Apenheul
- Moja (One): female, * 13 December 2004 in Prague Zoo, daughter of Richard and Kijivu, sister of Tatu and Kiburi, the first gorilla born in Prague Zoo
- Tatu (Third): male, * 30 May 2007 in Prague Zoo, son of Richard and Kijivu, brother of Moja and Kiburi. Died 27 July 2012 due to accidental hanging.
- Kiburi (Proud): male, * 24 April 2010 in Prague Zoo, son of Richard and Kijivu, brother of Moja and Tatu
- Nuru: male, 22 December 2012 in Prague Zoo, son of Richard and Kijivu, brother of Moja, Tatu, and Kiburi.

== Marketing ==
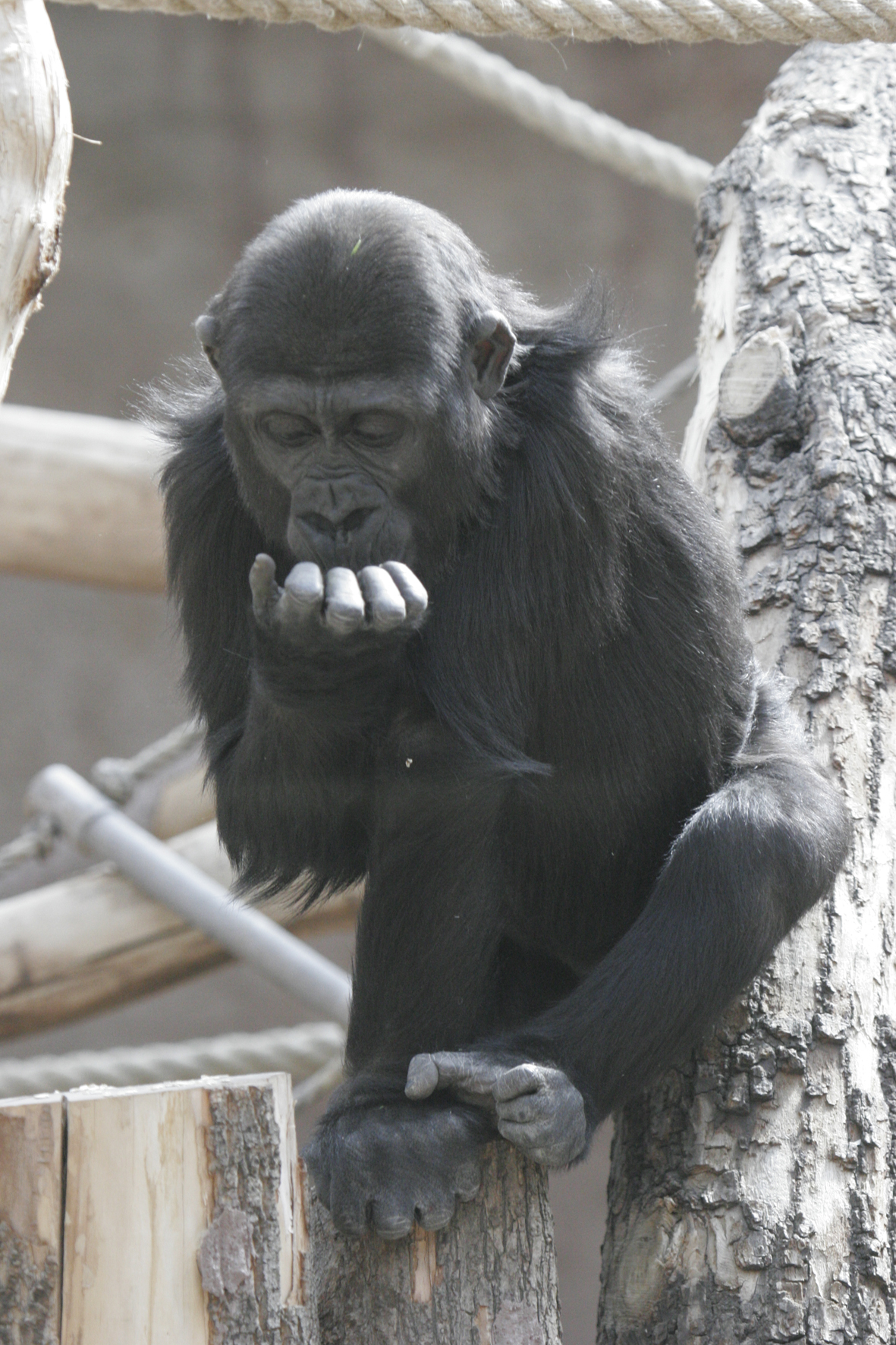
Moja

Although the project started as a parody of human reality shows and an educational programme, it has become an effective internet marketing strategy, attracting substantial attention from the media and the public and creating publicity for Prague Zoo. Both the zoo and the Czech Radio website have received an increased number of visitors as a result of the project.

The Revealed is a multimedia project. Clips of all the webcasts since the show began are accessible via an archive on the project's website, with comments from zookeepers, primatologists, ethologists and other specialists, along with podcasts and articles about the project. The website also carries a discussion forum and blogs, one of which is maintained by the gorilla zookeeper, in which he answers questions from visitors to the website about the gorillas' lives.

The show's creators have used the show to warn about gorillas becoming a critically endangered species. Money raised from merchandising, charges for SMS voting, and online auctions of paintings and photos of the Prague gorillas has been used to help wild gorillas in Africa. News about the gorillas supported in Africa is also reported on the project's website.

== Awards ==
A DVD based on the show was awarded the Comenius-EduMedia 2007 award by Gesellschaft für Pädagogik und Information. It was also awarded the Panda Award at Wildscreen Festival in 2006, in the ARKive interactive award category.

The project's website came fourth in the Internet Project of the Year category at the Prix Europa in 2006.
