= Prague Zoo =

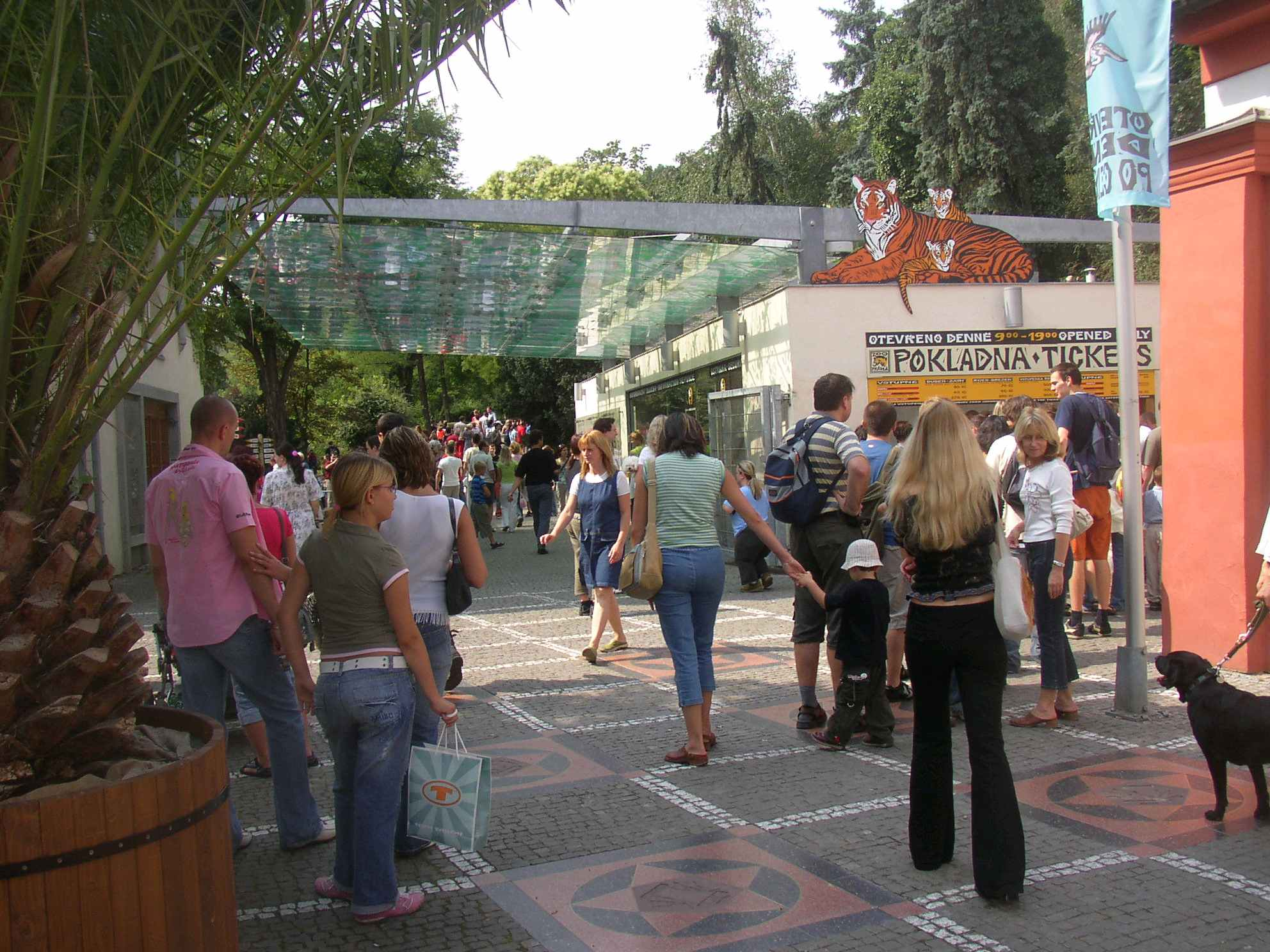
- The main entrance
- Interactive map of Prague Zoo
- 50°07′01″N 14°24′22″E
- Date opened: September 28, 1931
- Location: U Trojského zámku 3/120, Troja, Prague 7, Prague, 17100, Czech Republic
- Land area: 58 hectares (140 acres)
- No. of animals: 5049 (December 2018)
- No. of species: 676 (December 2018)
- Memberships: EAZA, WAZA, IZEA
- Website: zoopraha.cz/

Prague Zoological Garden (Czech: Zoologická zahrada hl. m. Prahy) is a zoo in Prague, Czech Republic. It was opened in 1931 with the goal to "advance the study of zoology, protect wildlife, and educate the public" in the district of Troja in the north of Prague. In 2013, the zoo occupied 58 hectares (140 acres) with 50 hectares (120 acres) in use for exhibits, and housed around 5,000 animals from 676 species, including 132 species listed as threatened.

The zoo is rated as the seventh best zoo in the world by Forbes Travel Guide in 2007, and is rated as the fifth best in the world by TripAdvisor. The zoo director is Lenka Poliaková.

The zoo has contributed significantly to saving Przewalski's horse; for many years, it was the leading breeder of the subspecies and these horses are transported to the Mongolian steppes.

== History ==
The idea for a zoological garden in Prague was first proposed in 1881 in a newspaper article by Count Sweerts-Spork, on the occasion of the marriage of Crown Prince Rudolf of Austria and Princess Stéphanie of Belgium.

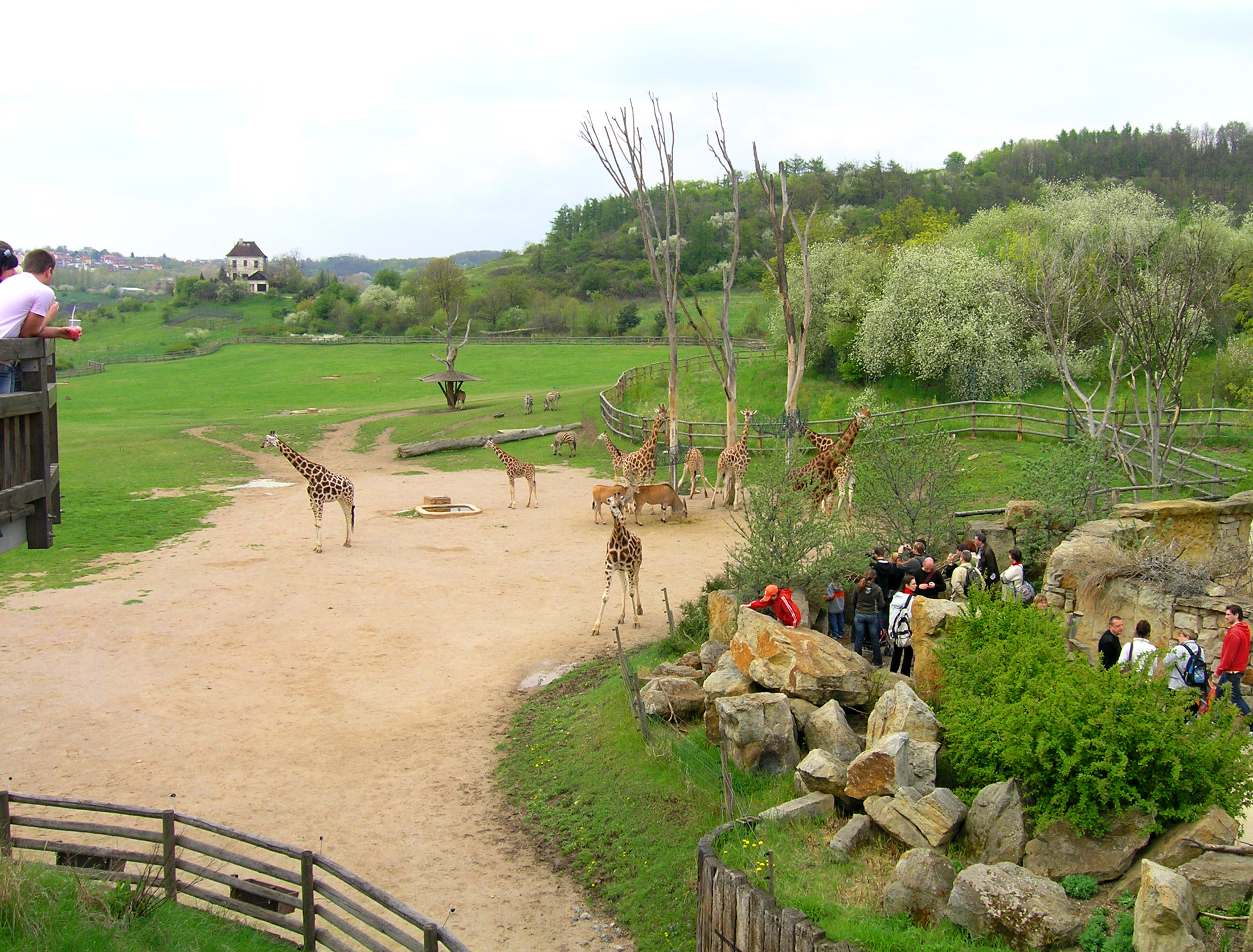
Giraffe exposition

In 1919, at a meeting of the advisory board for mathematics and natural sciences at the Ministry of Education and National Enlightenment, a committee was established to start the preparatory work on the establishment of the zoo. The zoo was opened to the public on 28 September 1931 by the founding director Jiří Janda.

In 1938, the first artificially bred Andean condor in the world was hatched and reared, and the first artificially bred polar bear, a female named Ilun, followed in 1942. In 1959 Dr. Zdeněk Veselovský was appointed as director of the zoo. Under his leadership, the zoo achieved some world-class successes in the area of breeding and scientific research.

In 1971, a new pavilion opened for large mammals, including elephants, hippos and rhinos, followed by a big cat pavilion in 1991.

In 2001, the first artificial breeding of a Przewalski's Horse in the world took place at the zoo.

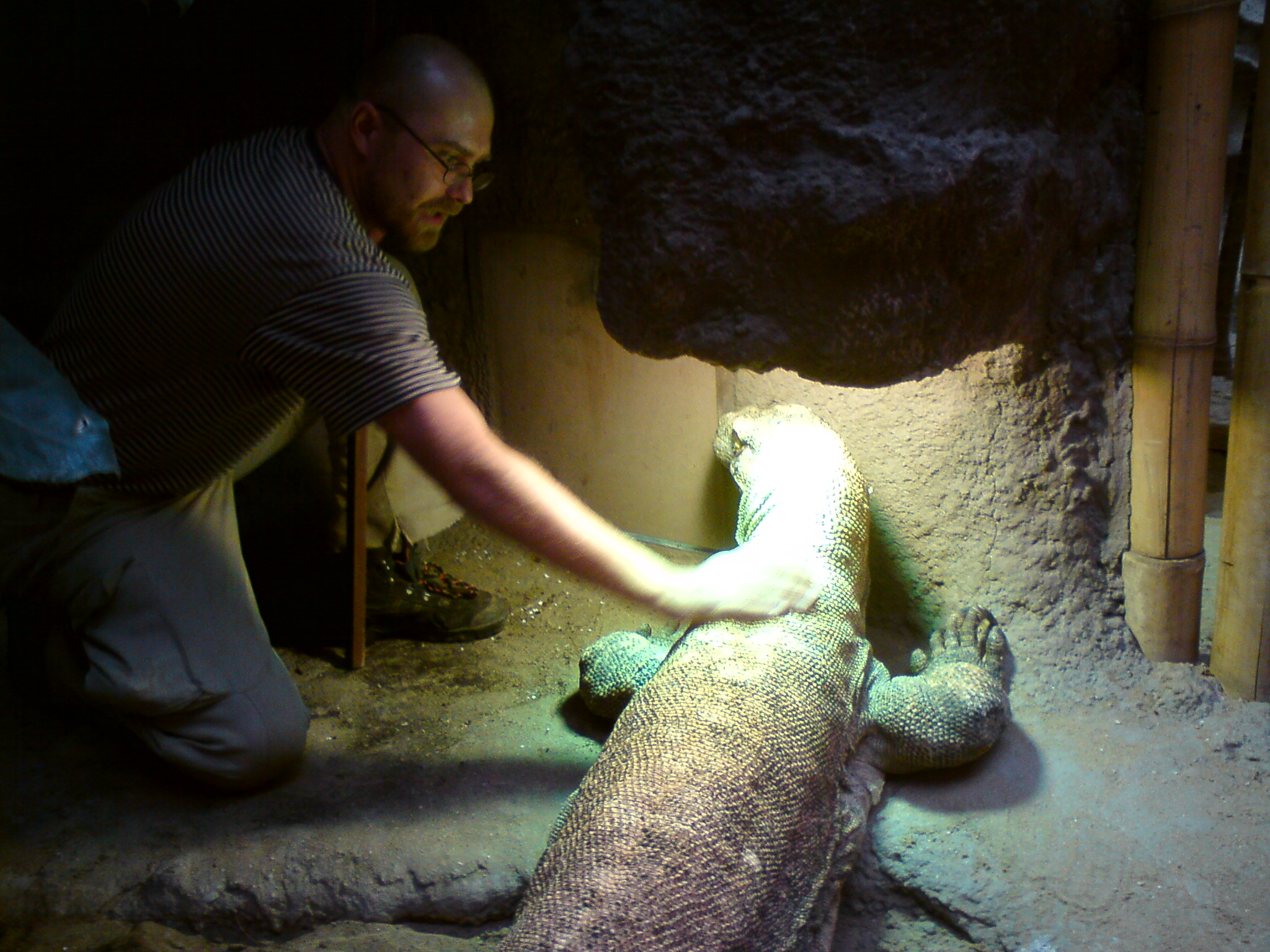
Komodo dragon with keeper Jan Janošek in Prague Zoo. Prague Zoo is leading breeder of Komodo dragons in captivity.

In 2002, Prague suffered the worst floods in its history. A large part of the zoo was flooded and 134 animals died, including an elephant, a lion, a gorilla, and four hippopotamuses. A brown fur seal named Gaston swam the Vltava and Elbe rivers to Dresden in Germany, where he later died from exhaustion or injury. Gaston was memorialized with a statue in the Prague Zoo. However, thanks to a big wave of solidarity and donations, Prague Zoo greatly flourished in the next decade.

The 'Indonesian Jungle' pavilion was opened in 2004 and, at the time, was the largest and most expensive animal pavilion in the country. That same year, the first Western lowland gorilla in the Czech Republic was born, and named Moja. This was followed in 2007 by the first breeding of a Komodo dragon at Prague Zoo. In 2009 a new exhibition for brown fur seals was opened, with an enlarged swimming pool and a grandstand. The following year saw a Texas tortoise bred in Europe for the first time.

In 2011, Moja, a western gorilla made famous from the multimedia project The Revealed, was moved to Cabarceno Natural Park in Spain. Four Przewalski's horses were transported to Mongolia to be released into the wild as part of Return of the Wild Horses reintroduction and in situ conservation project.

In 2012, the zoo saw its highest number of births, numbering 1,557 from 211 species, including the world's first breeding of the crowned river turtle and the rufous-cheeked laughingthrush, as well as Prague Zoo's first breeding of the red panda. In 2013, a large new Elephant Valley pavilion was introduced and the first elephant was born at Prague Zoo, named Sita. The zoo was flooded in June the same year for a second time, but most animals were evacuated in time.

In 2014, a pavilion was opened for 33 critically endangered Chinese giant salamanders, including three adults. The collection features the largest of such salamanders in Europe.

In 2017, after 13 years of waiting, the zoo became one of only three zoos in the world with a breeding pair of Lesser Antillean iguanas.

In 2023, the zoo saw the first birth of a Chinese pangolin in captivity. The pangolin was born in February and weighed in at 135 grams. The birth gives hope that the animal can be rescued from its current status on the endangered species list.

In 2023, the zoo received a breeding group of Brazilian mergansers from Zooparque Itatiba, becoming the first institution outside Brazil keeping these critically endangered birds. In March 2025, the zoo has become the first in Europe and only the second in the world to successfully hatch this species with just around 250 individuals left in the wild. Native to South America and once thought extinct, Brazilian mergansers are rare fish eating ducks with distinctive beaks. The zoo supports conservation work in Brazil and plans to introduce the ducklings to the public around Easter 2025. This success boosts hopes for the species’ long-term survival.

In 2025, the zoo joined the conservation program of the critically endangered Lord Howe Island stick insect. The zoo became the sixth institution in the world to create living conditions for D. australis and the third to put them on display. The new "Ball’s Pyramid" exhibit also includes greenhouses and garden beds for cultivating the plants used to feed the insects.

The 5 years old Sumatran orangutan named Kawi has drowned at the zoo on December 12th. As informed officially, the incident have happened due to underestimated abilities of the animal. However, critics point out that the danger of drowning could be prevented by eliminating the water moat which was already a source of dangerous accidents before as orangutans have no ability to swim.

== Gallery ==
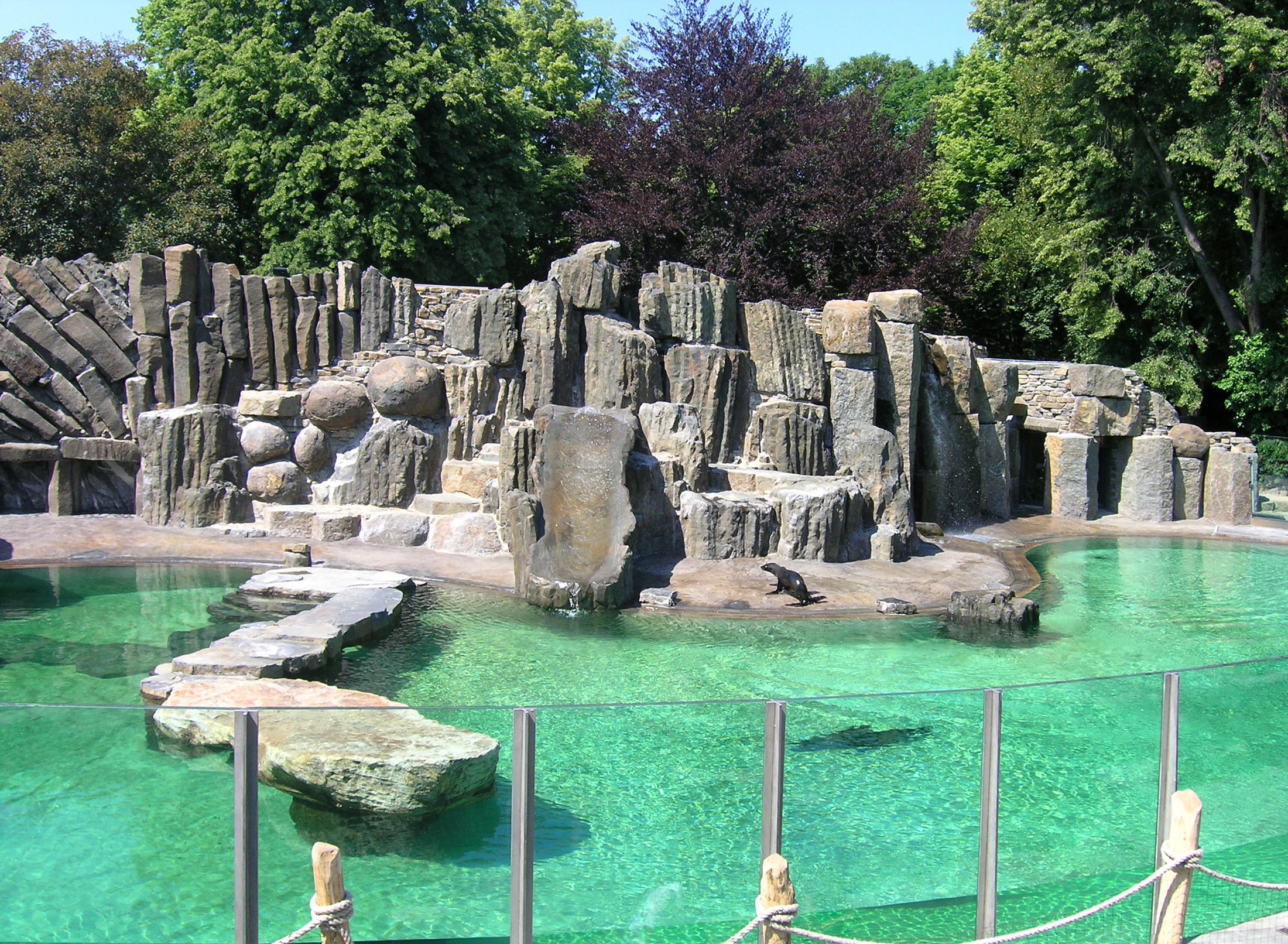
Fur seal's exposition

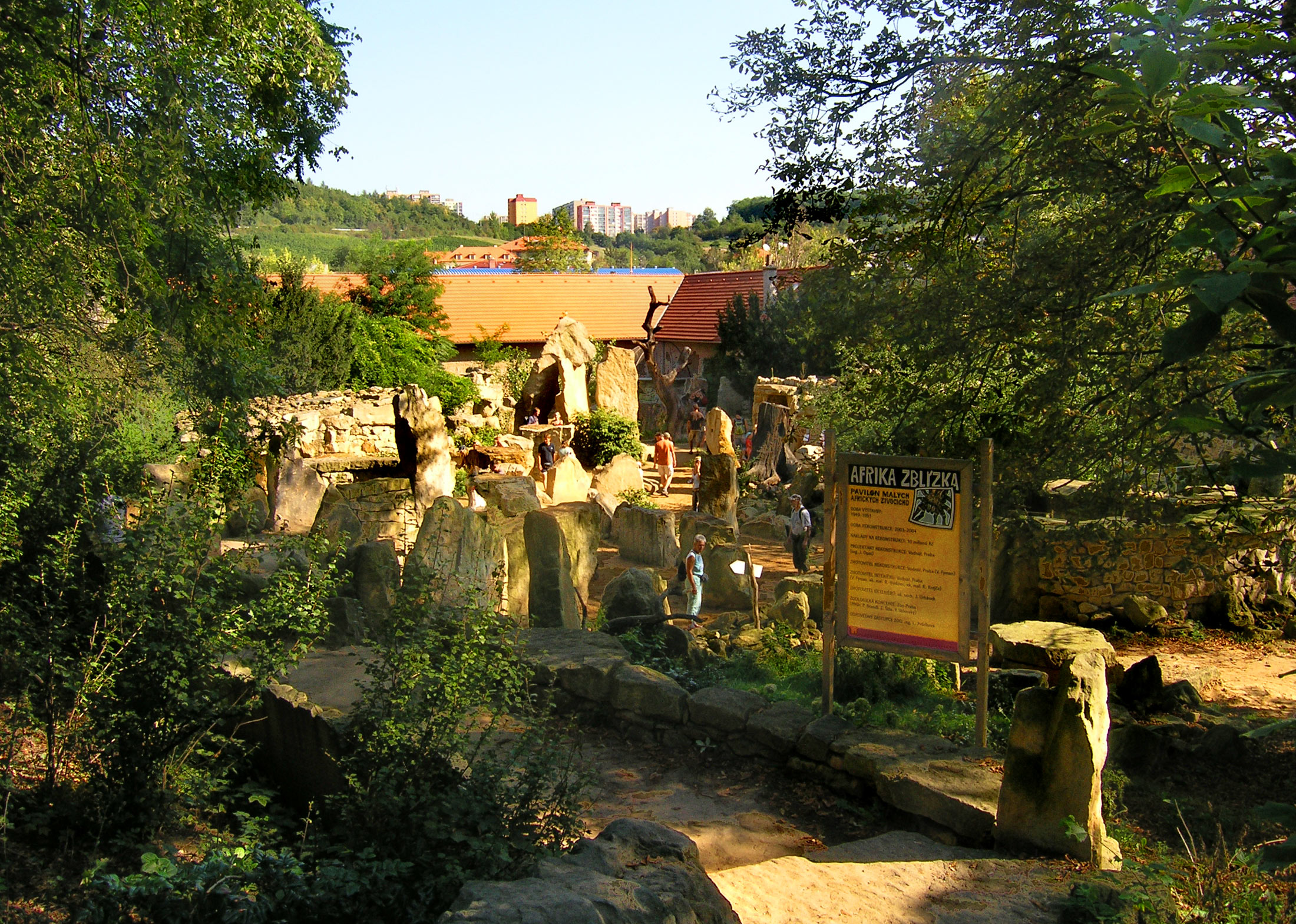
Africa closely

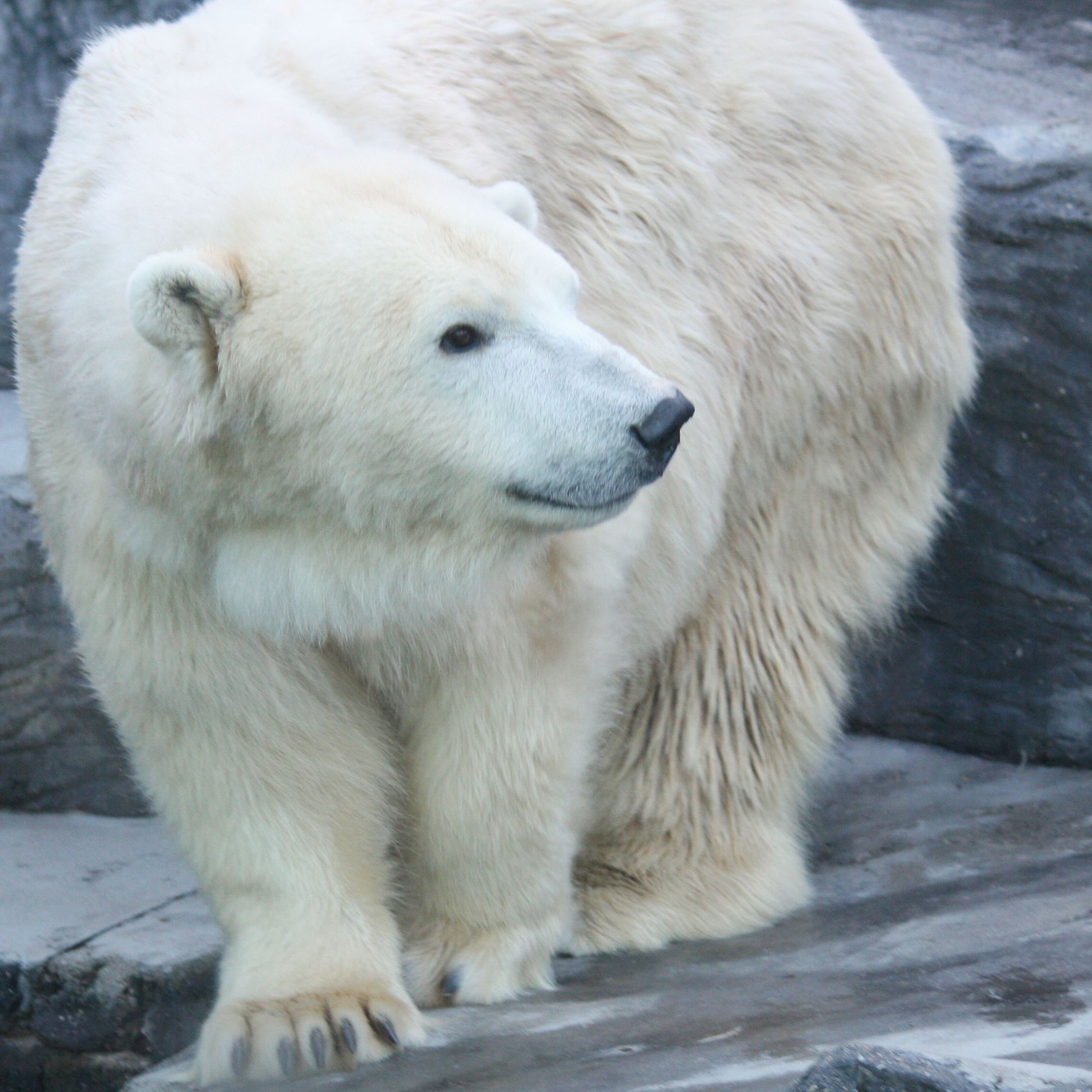
Polar bear

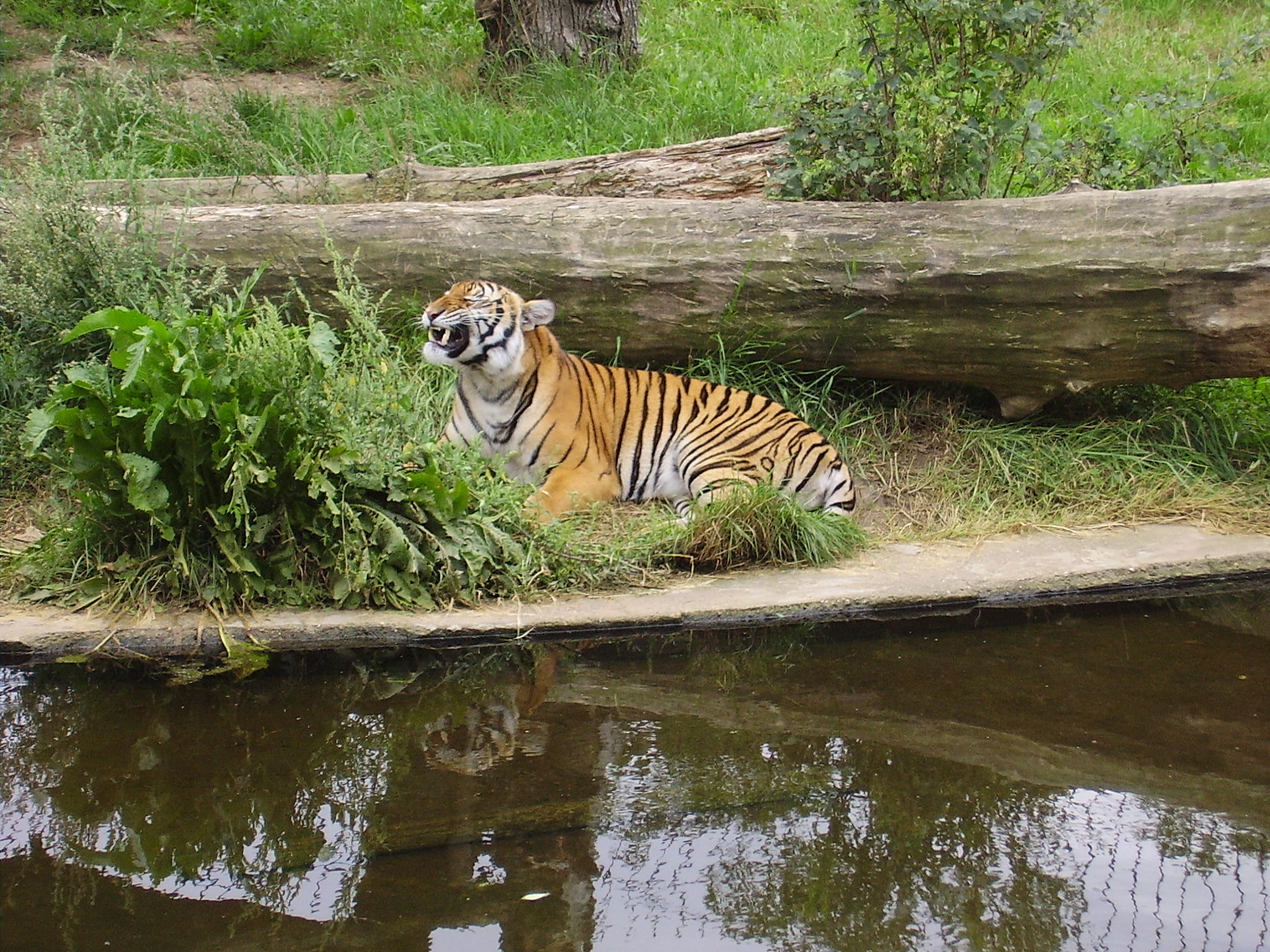
Sumatran tiger

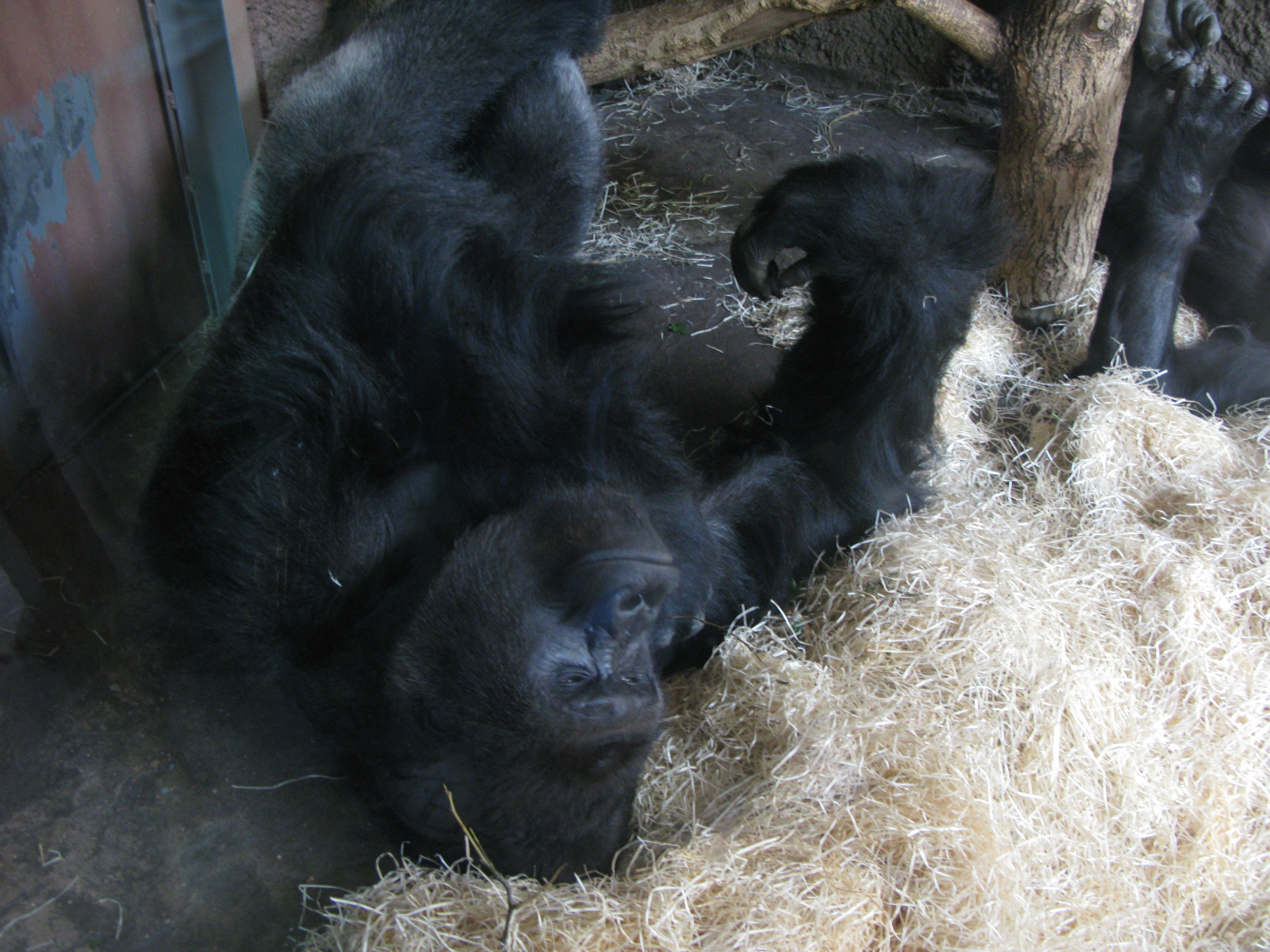
Western lowland gorilla

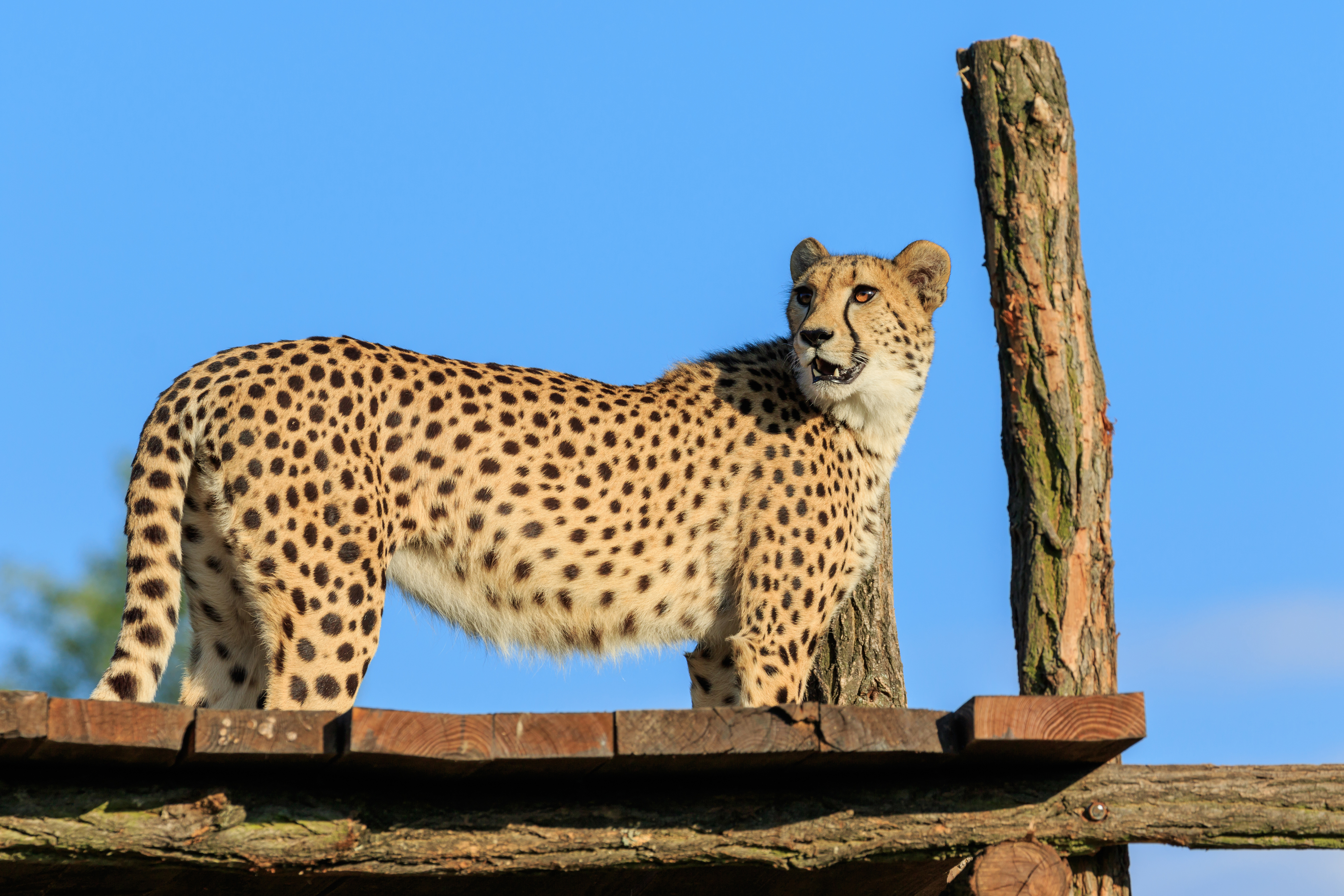
Cheetah

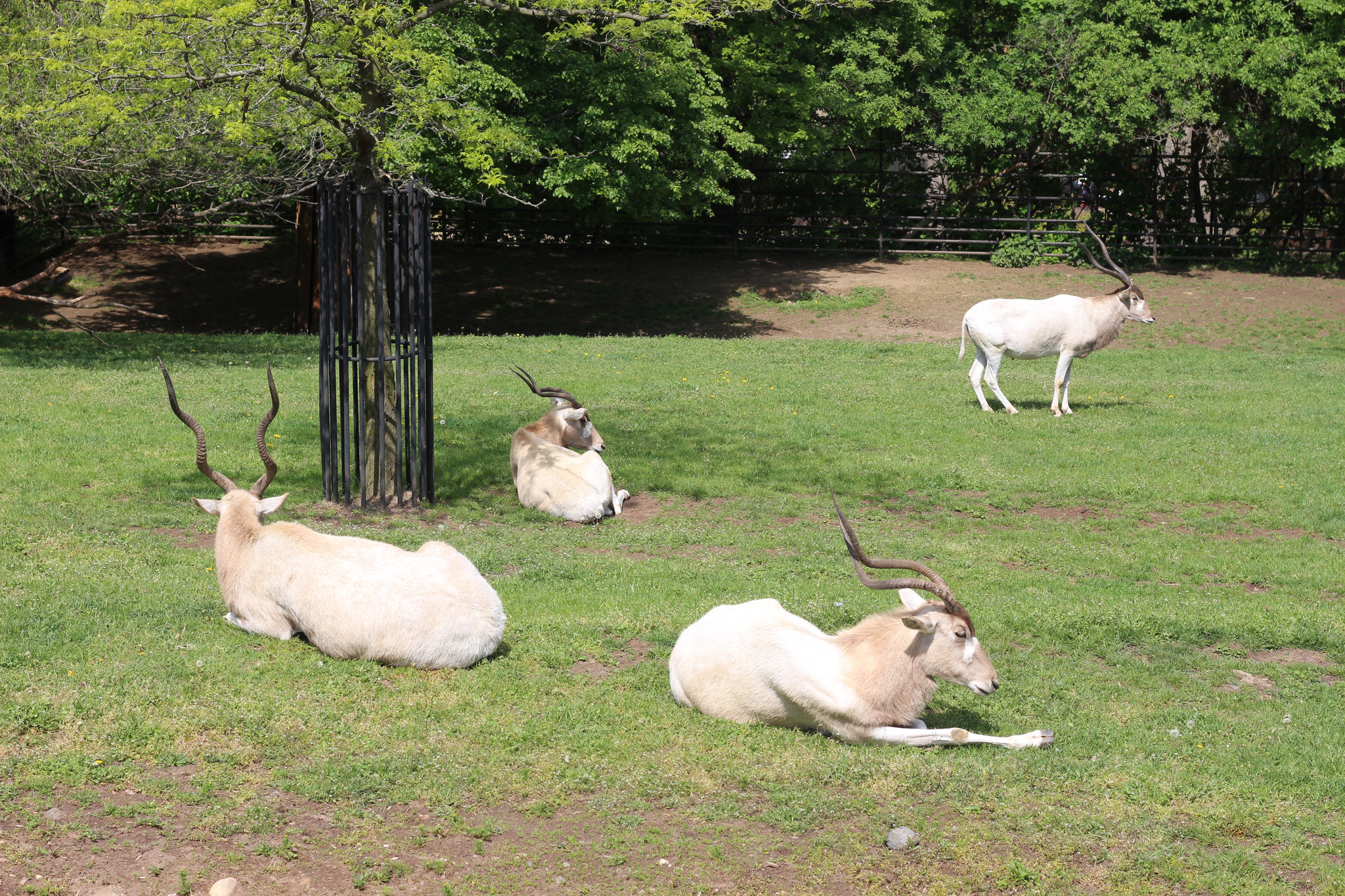
Addax

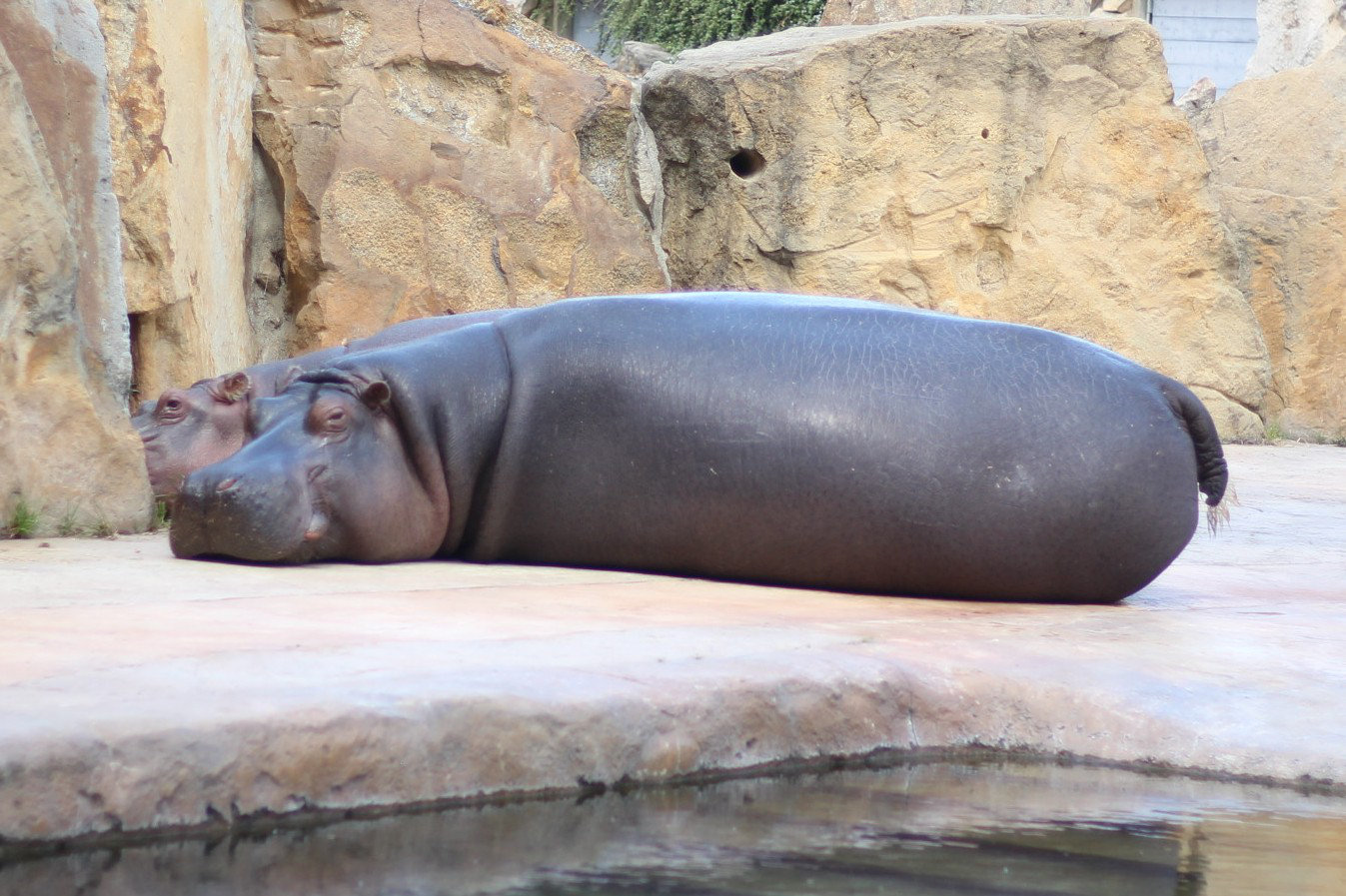
Hippopotamus

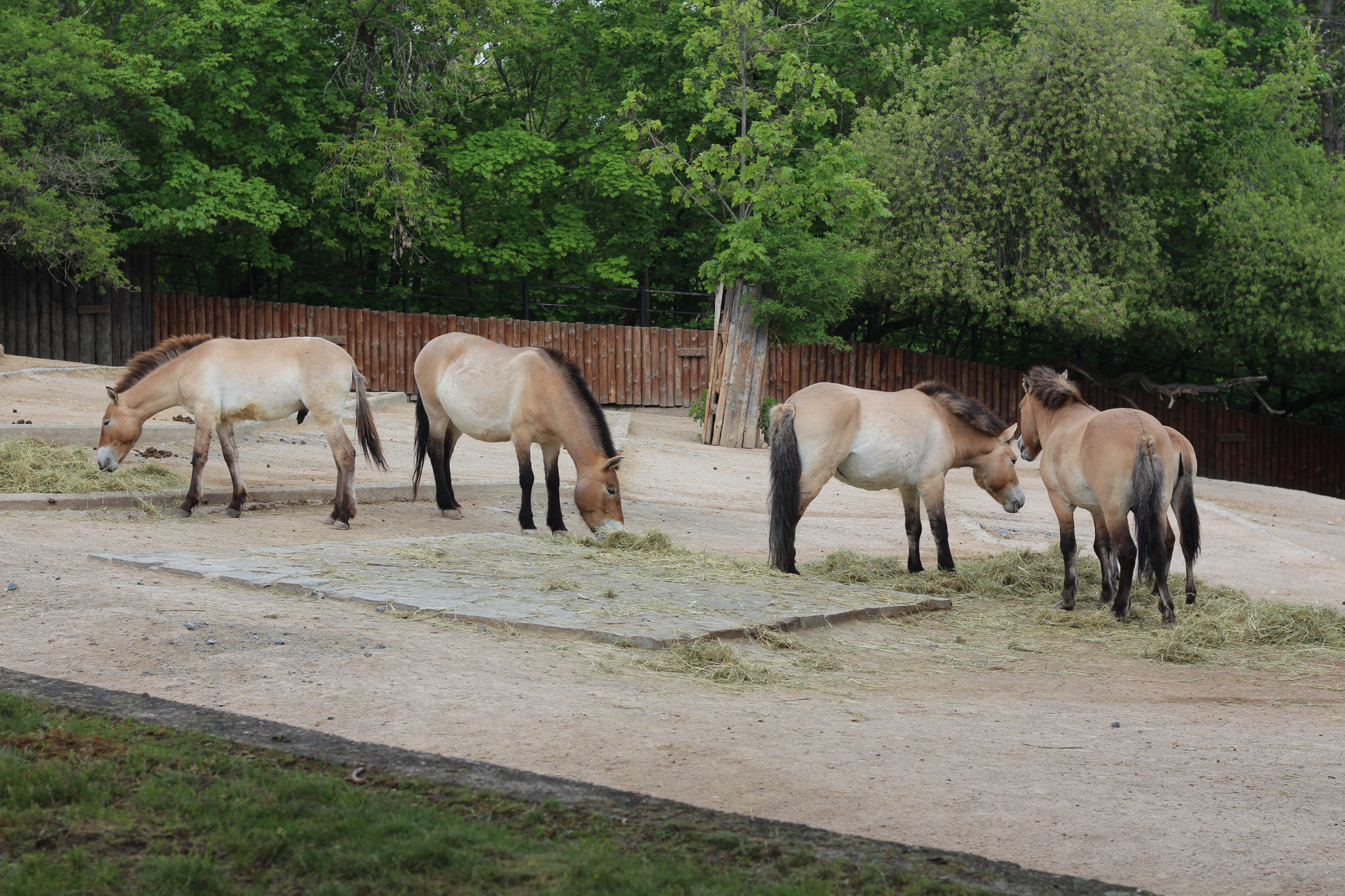
Przewalski's horse

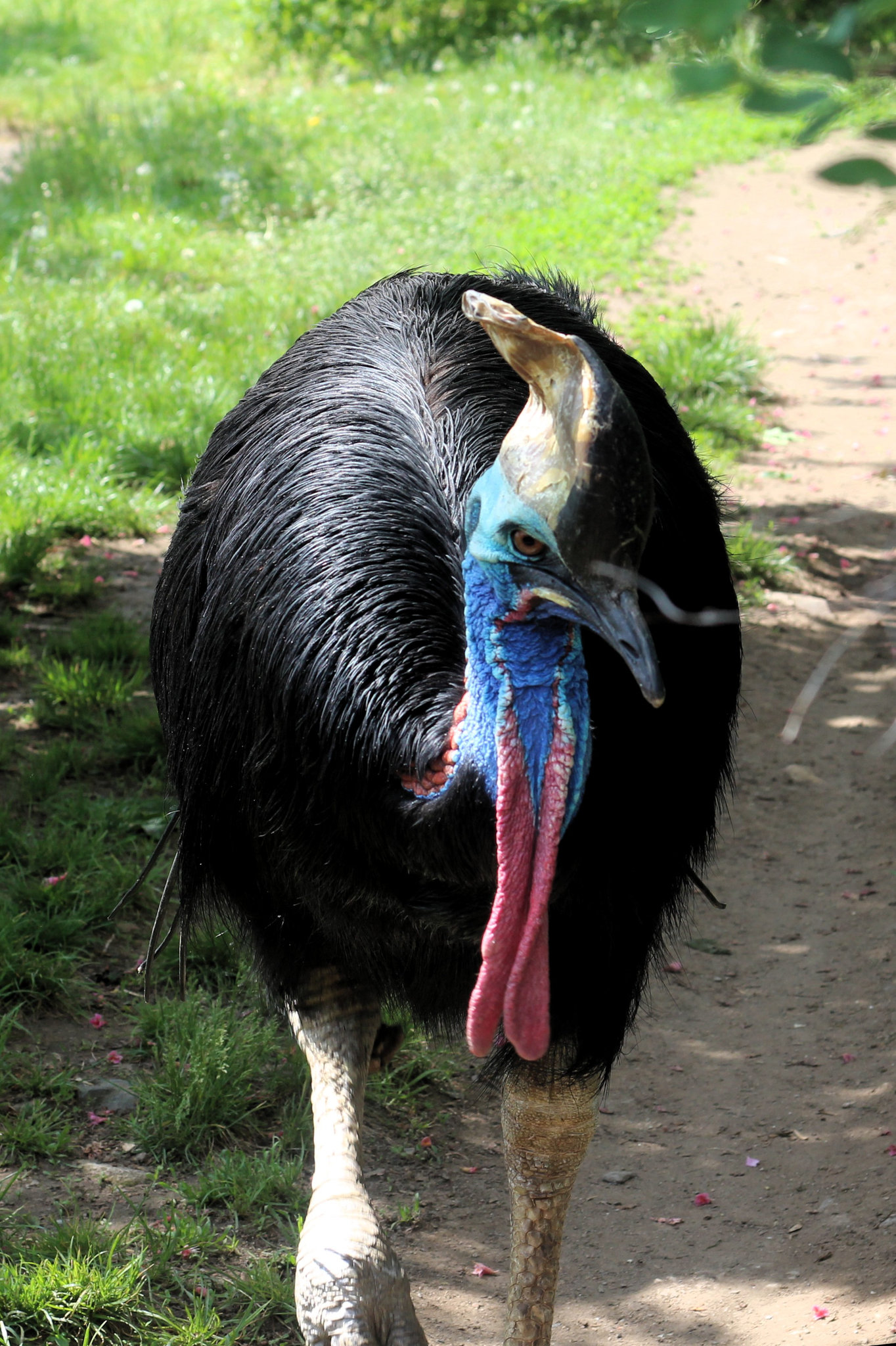
Southern Cassowary

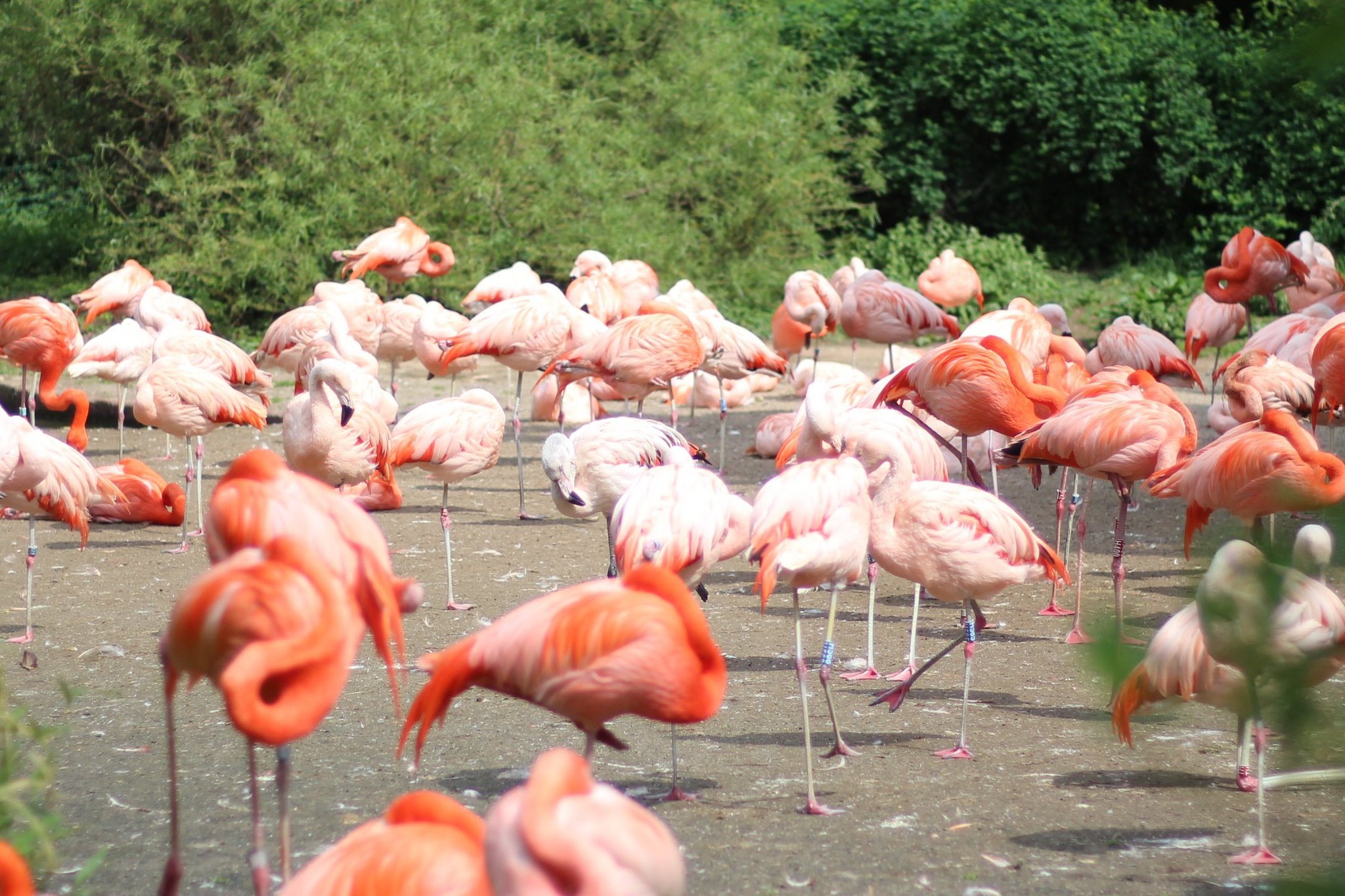
Chilean flamingo

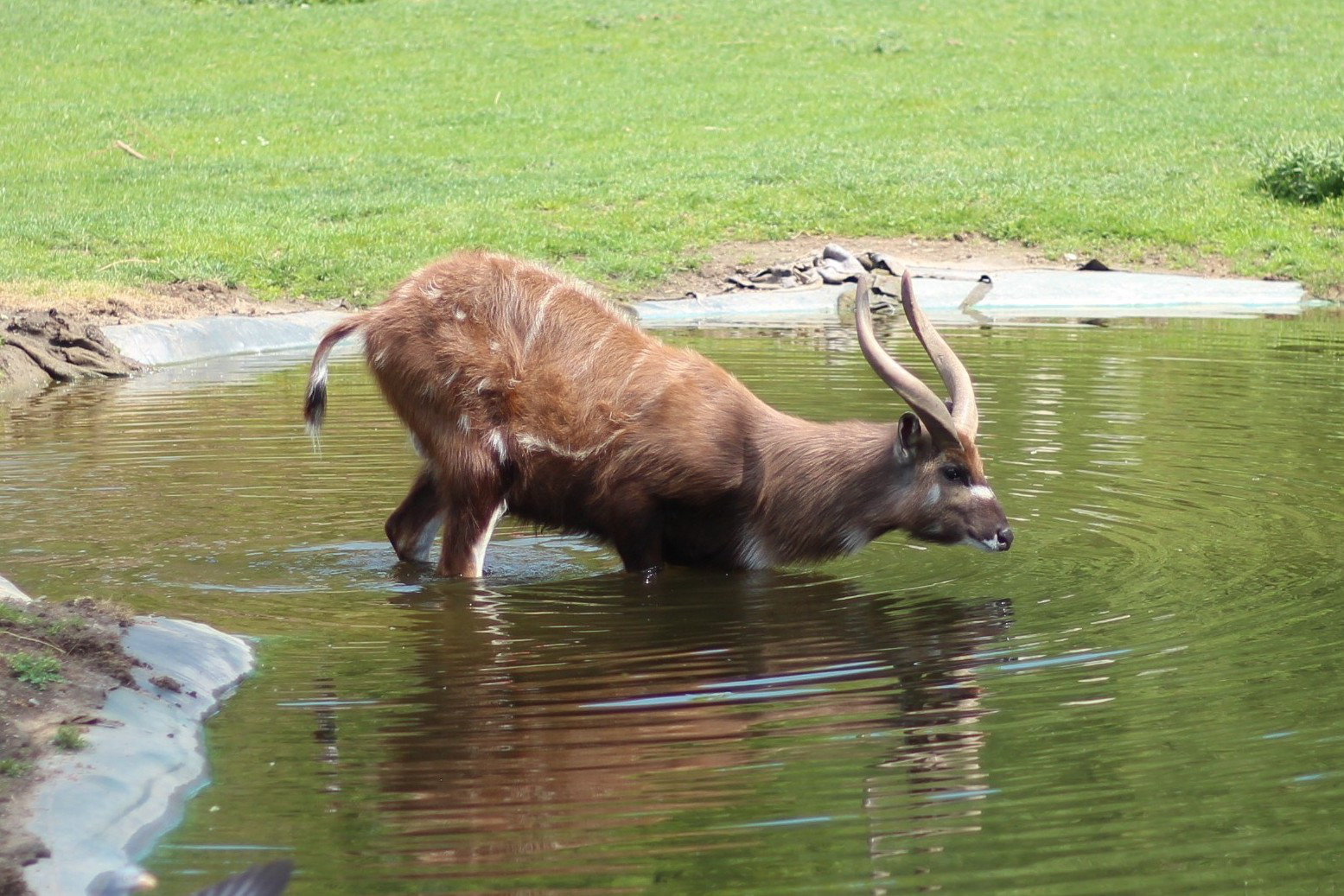
Sitatunga

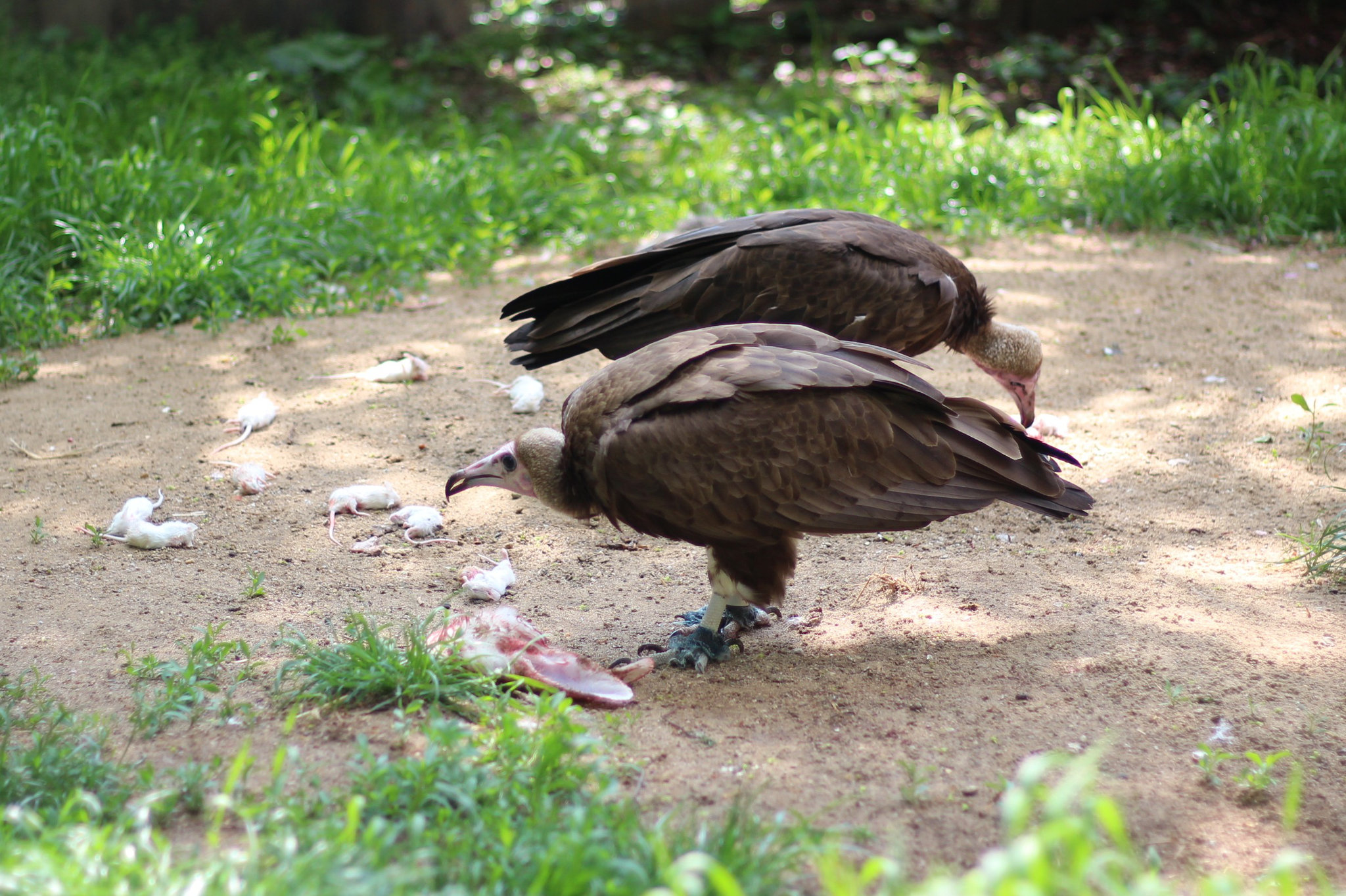
Hooded vulture

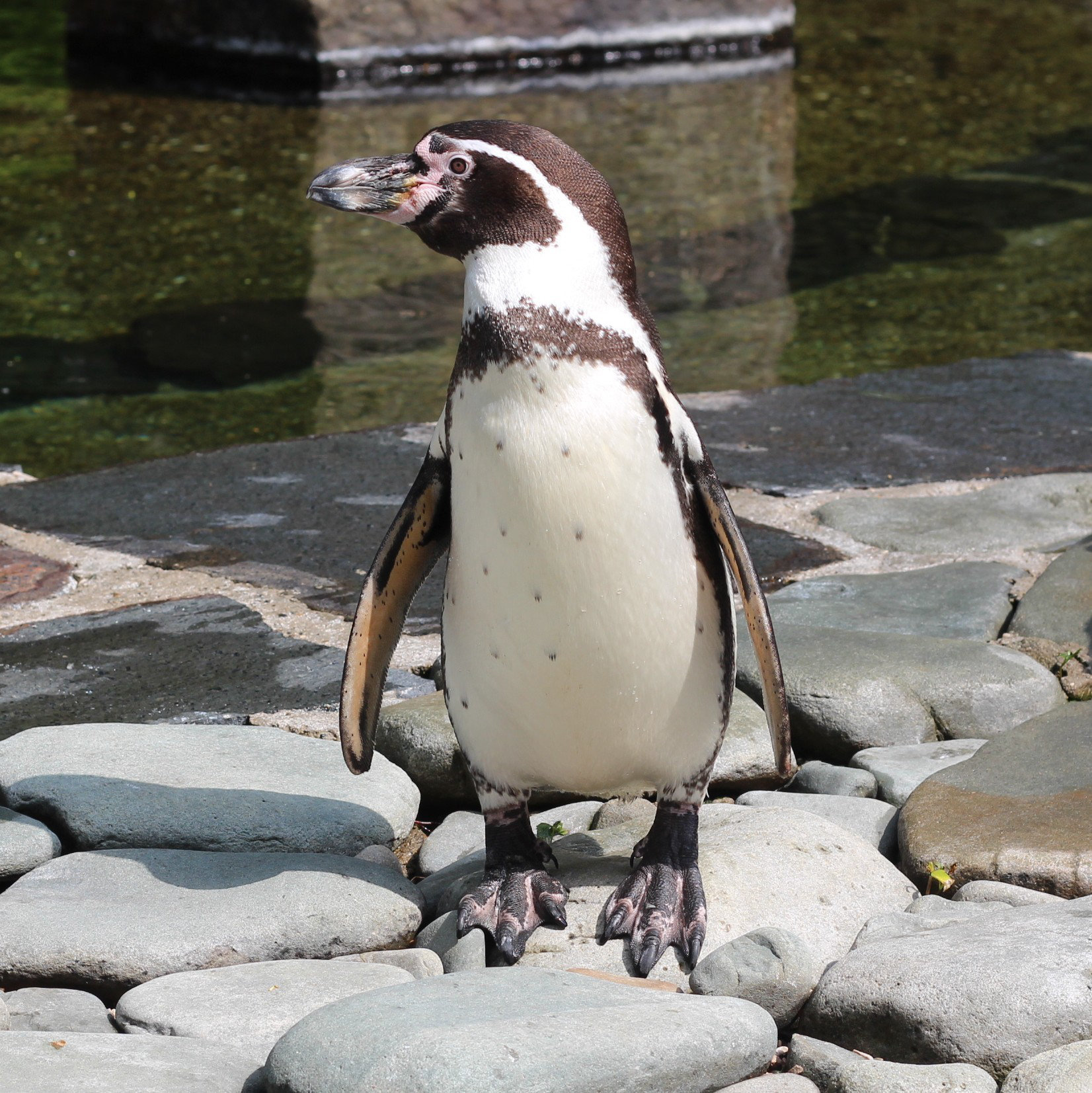
Humboldt penguin

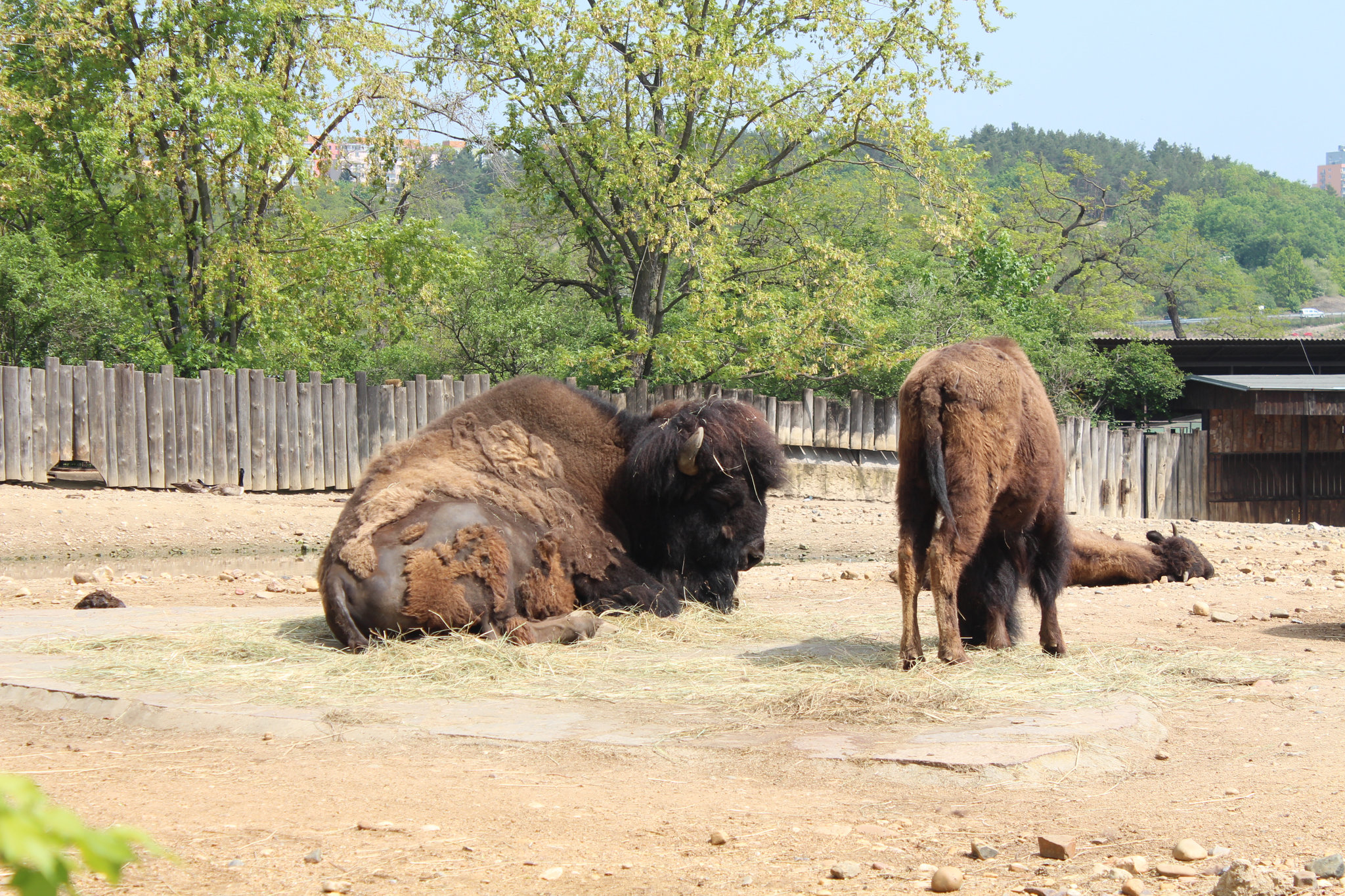
Bison

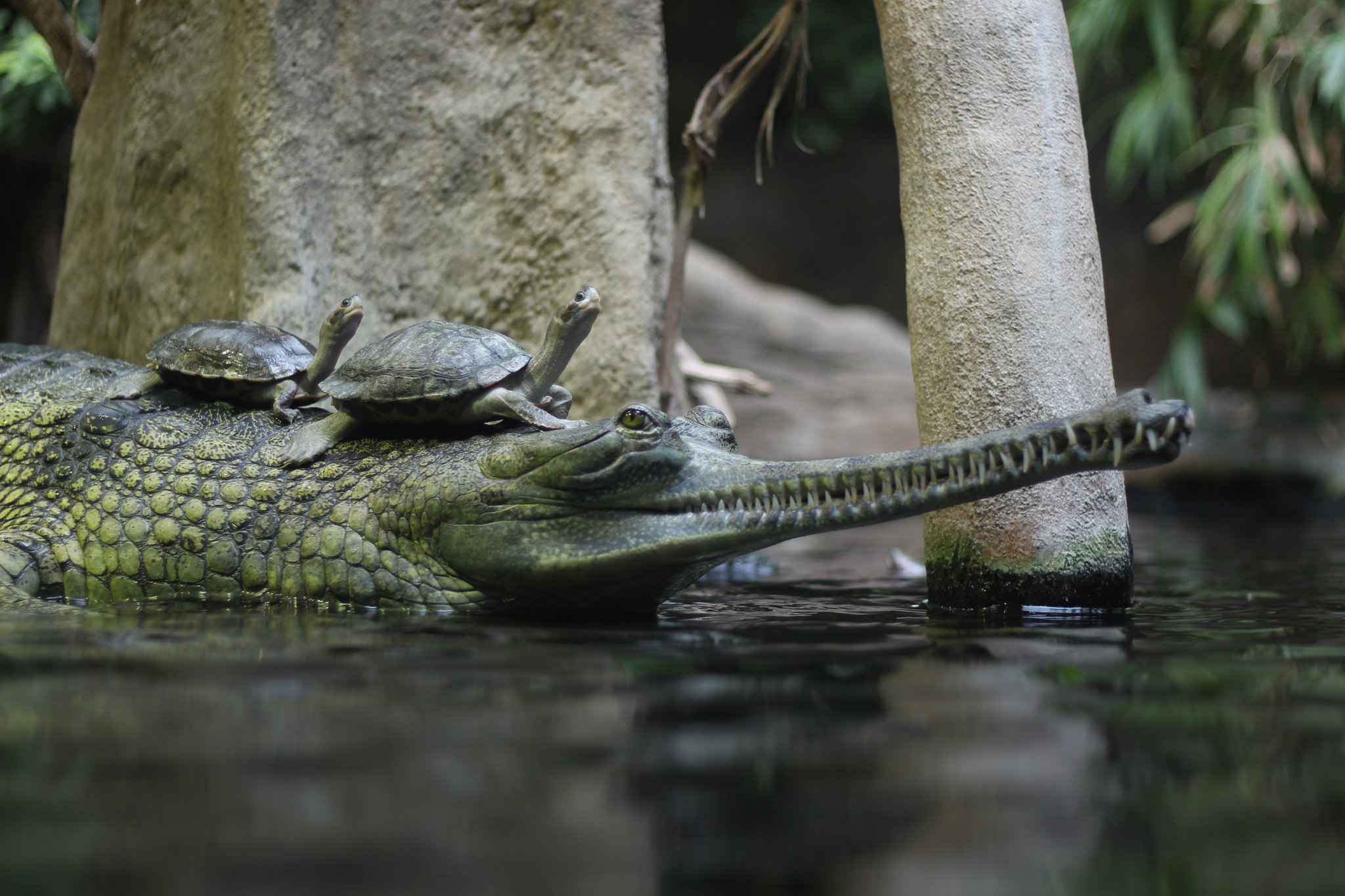
Gharial

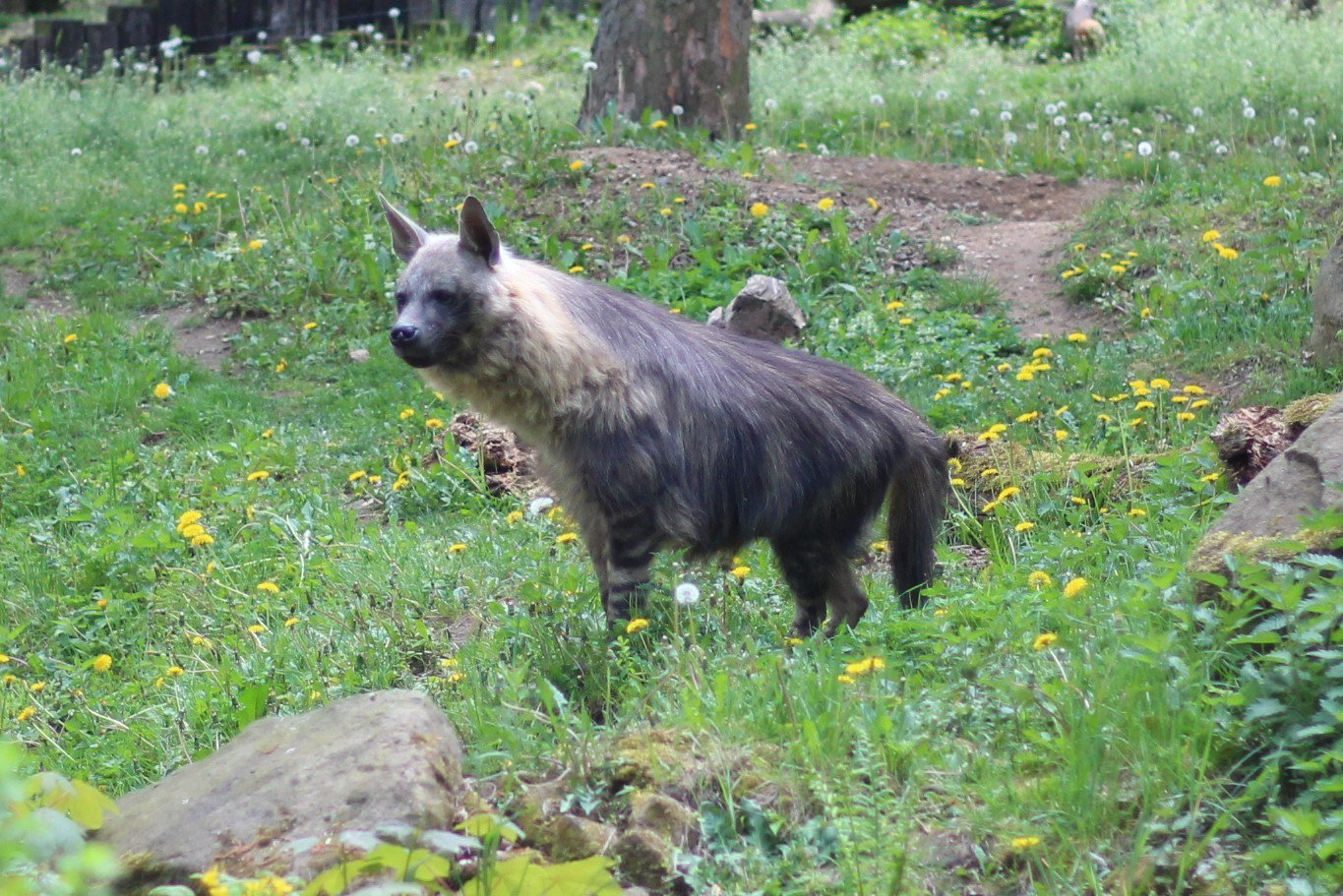
Brown hyena

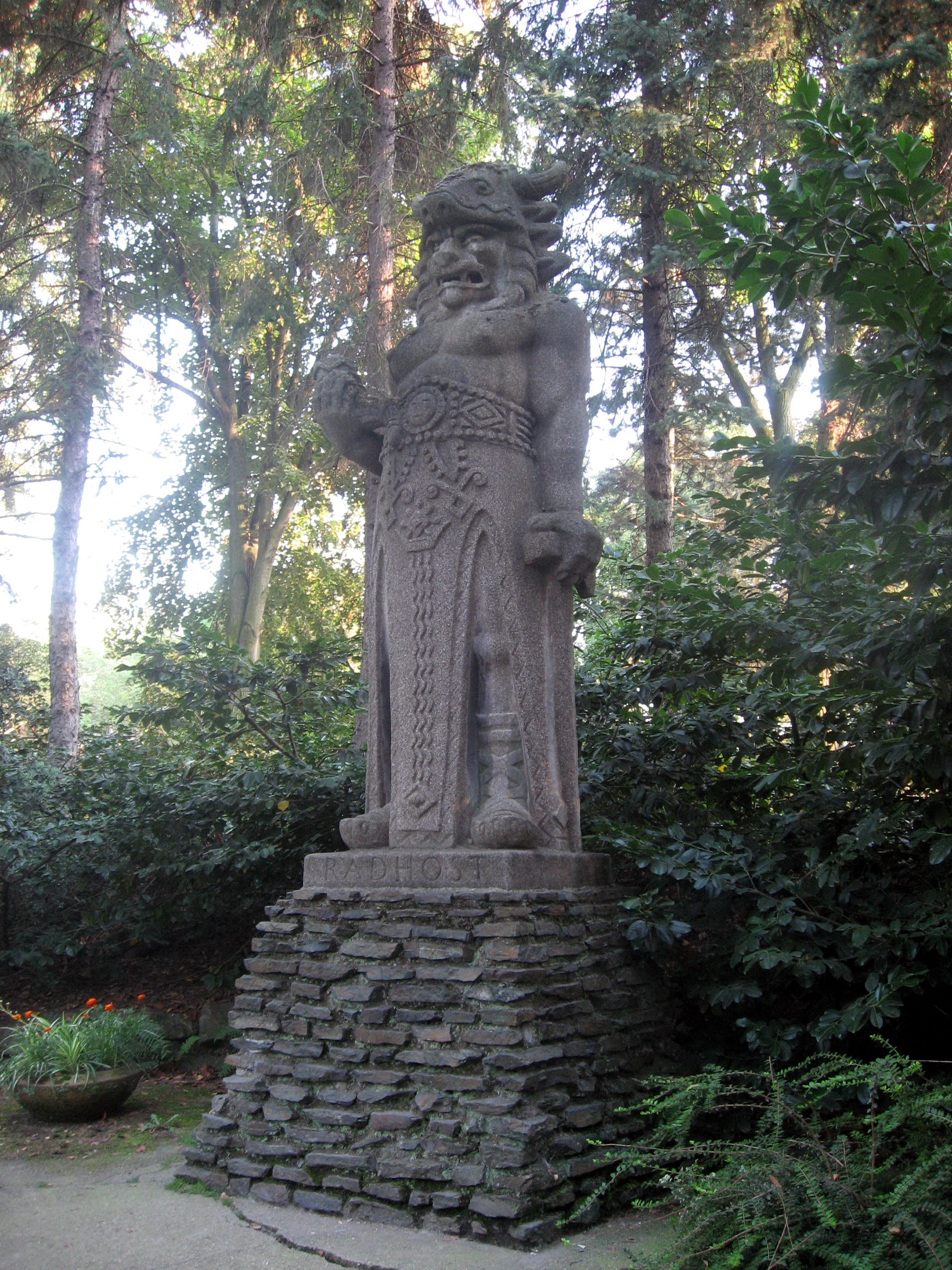
Radegast sculpture in Prague Zoo

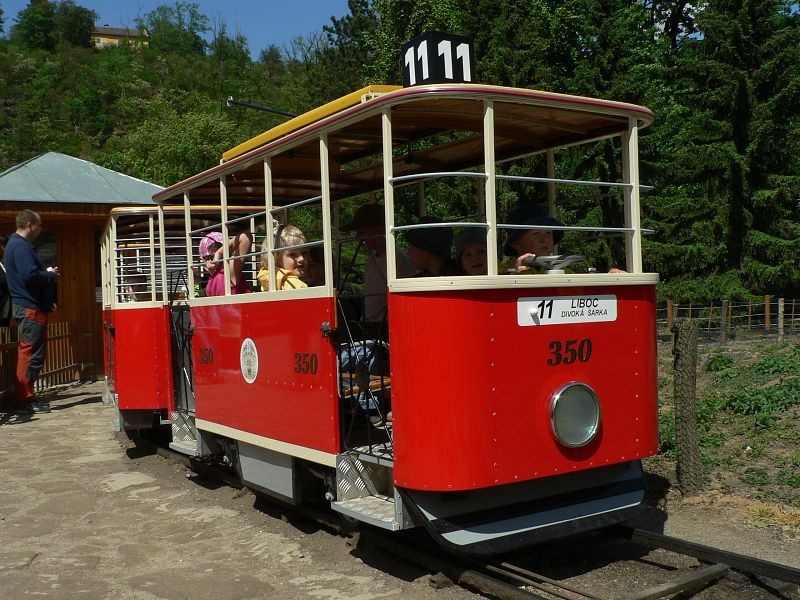
A small zoo tram

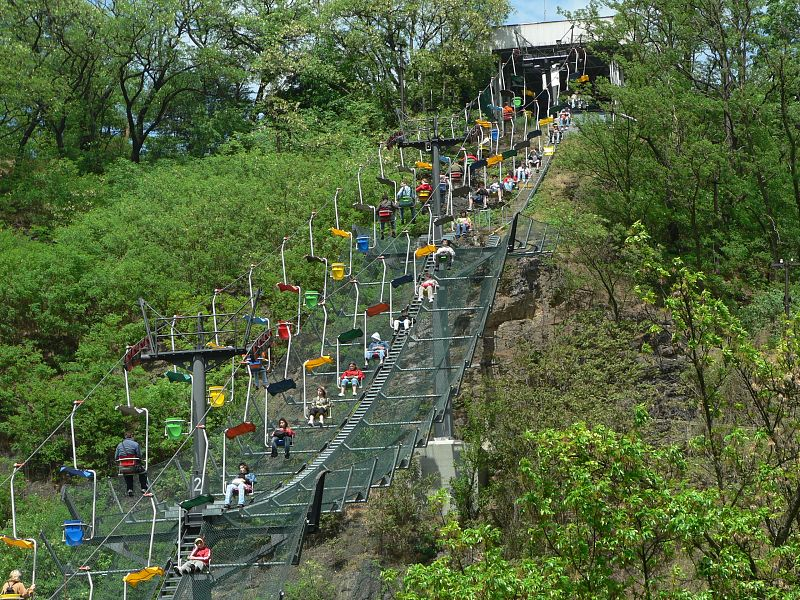
The Zoo chairlift (opened in 1977)

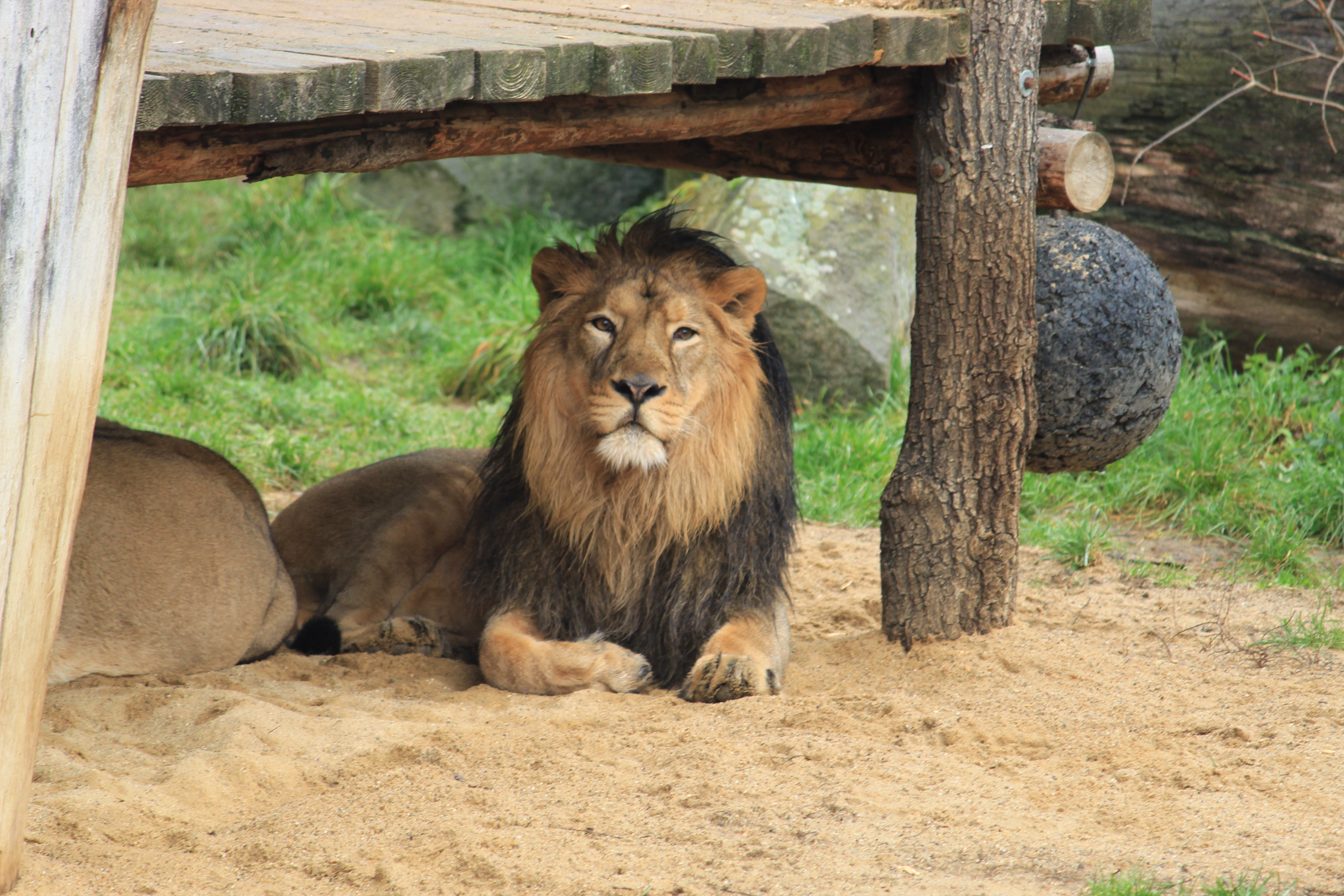
Lion

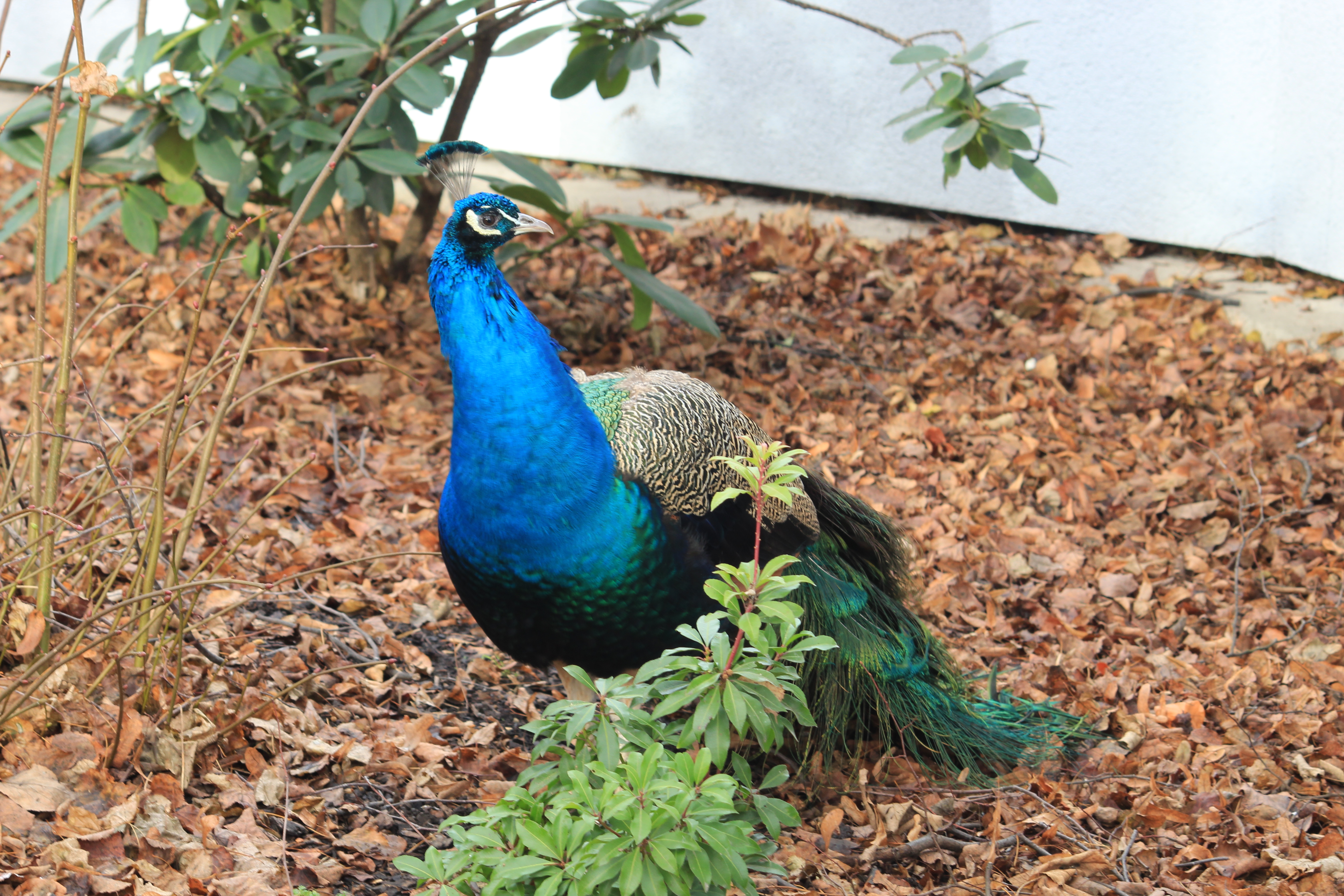
A Peacock

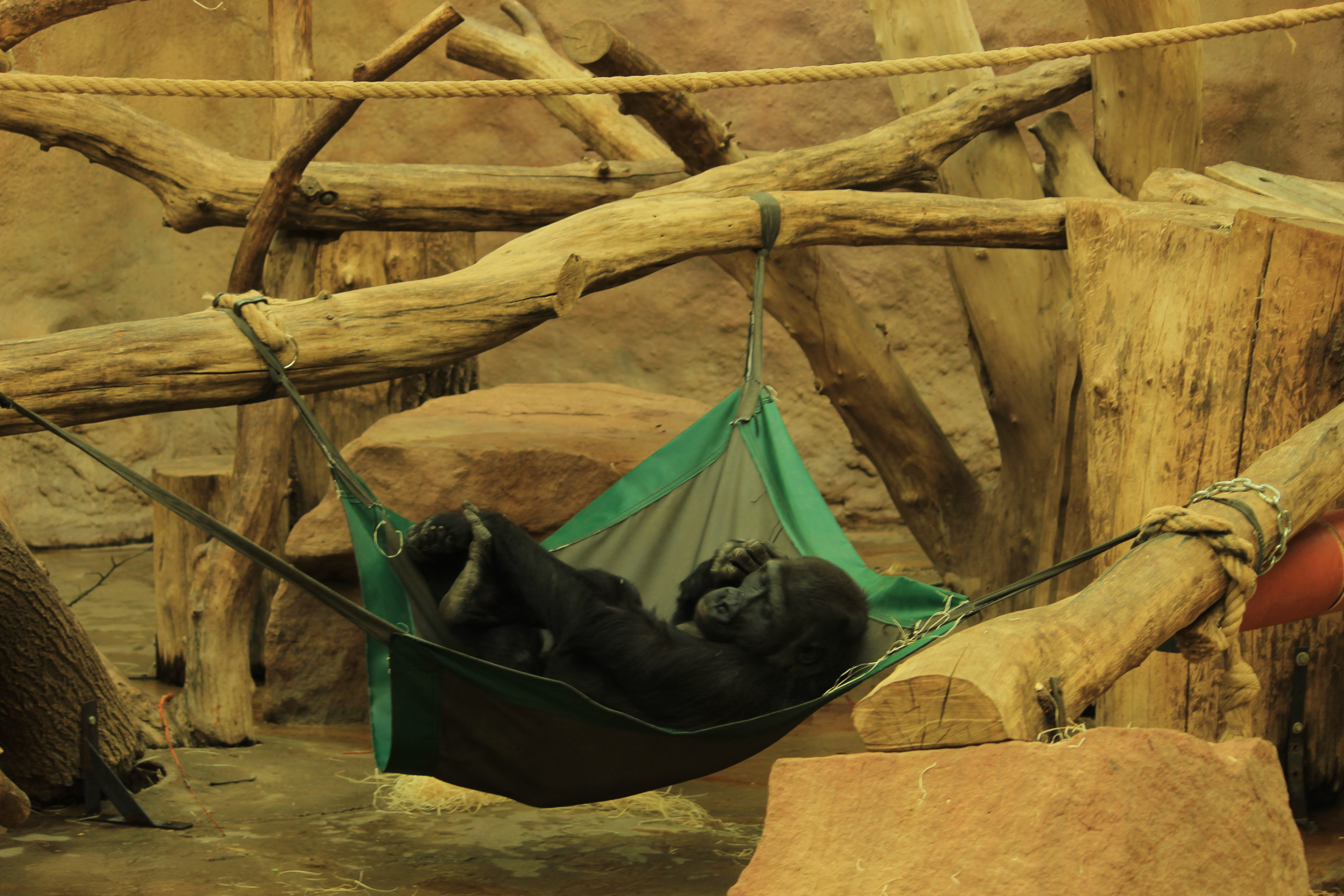

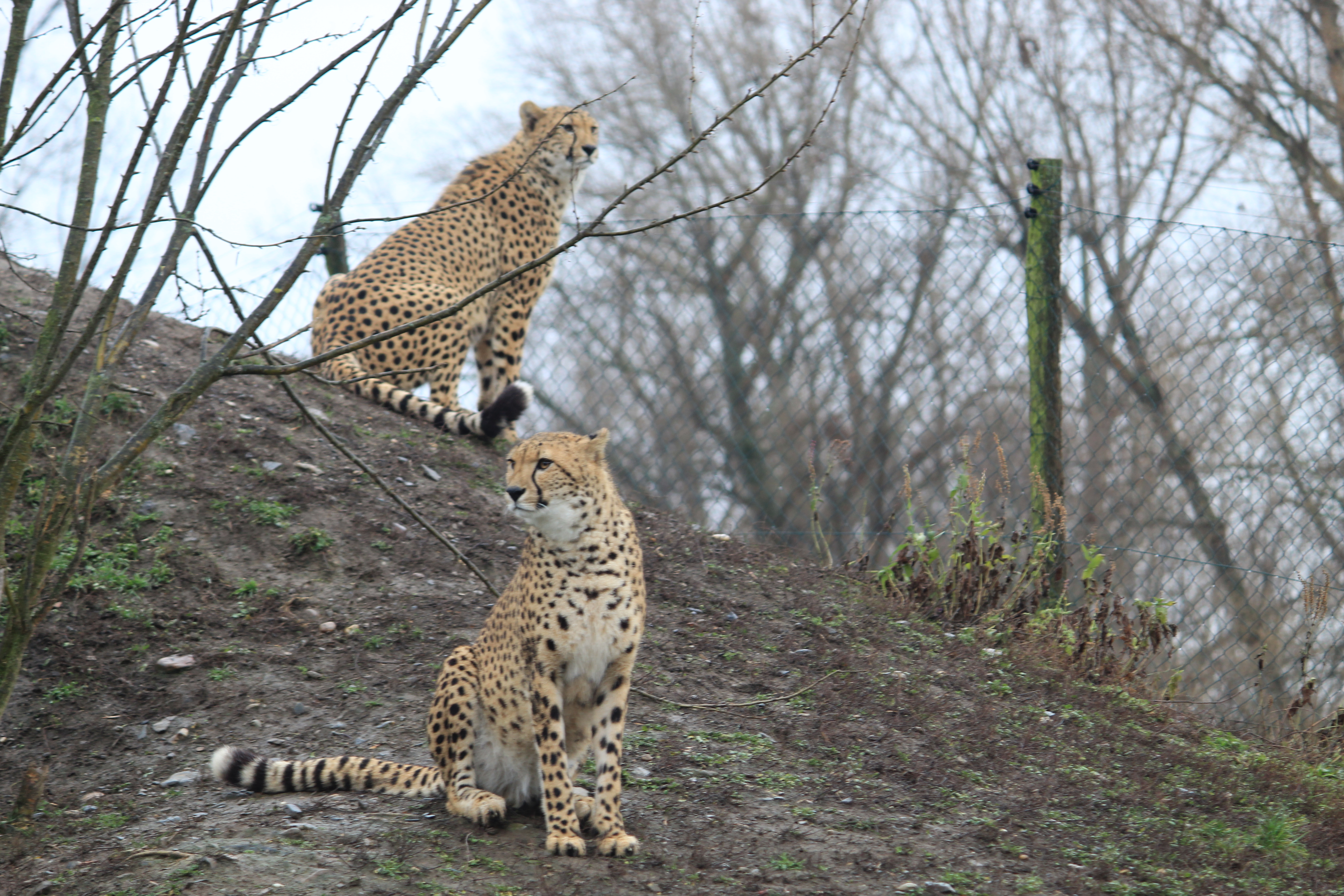

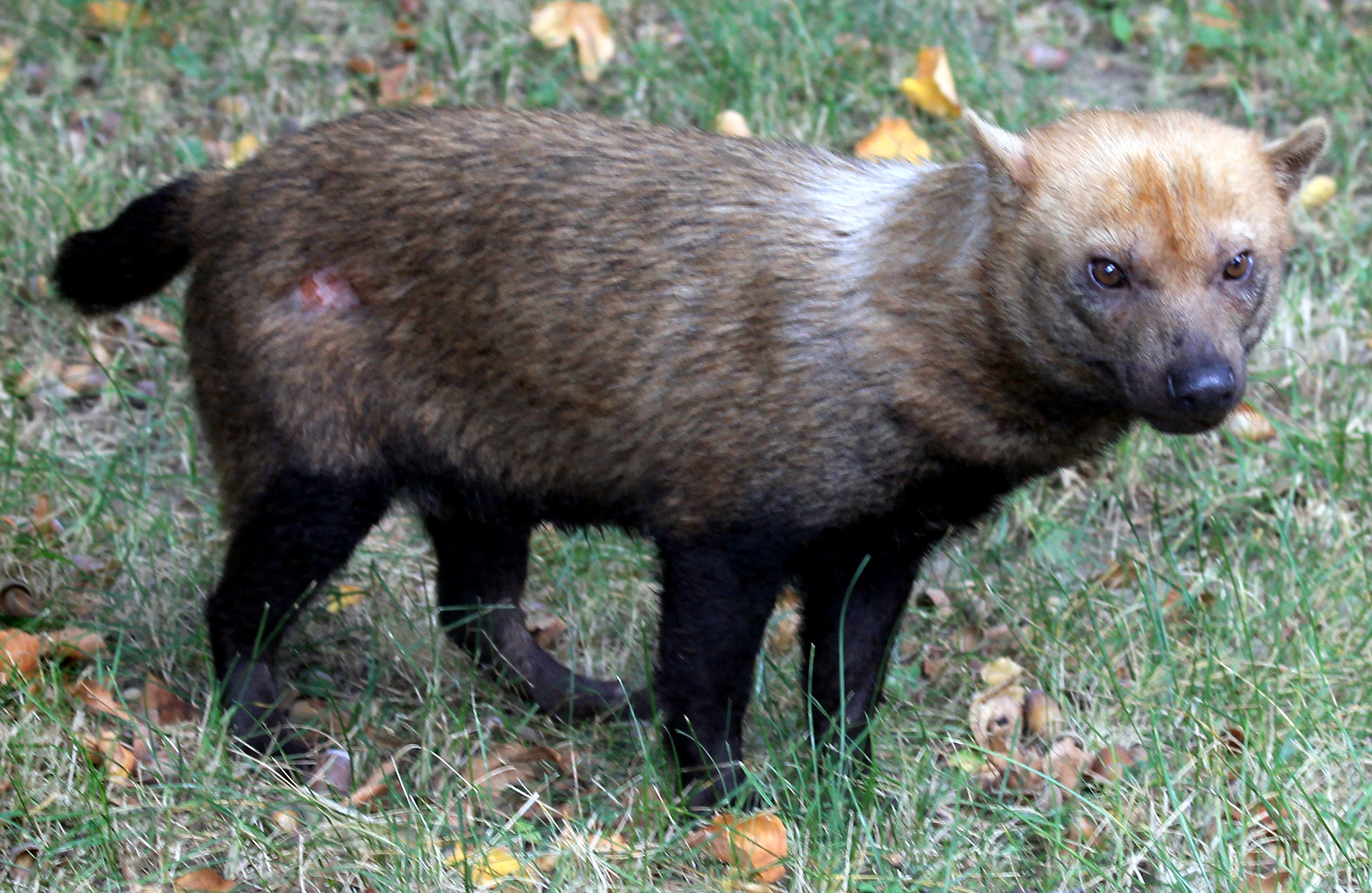
Bush dog

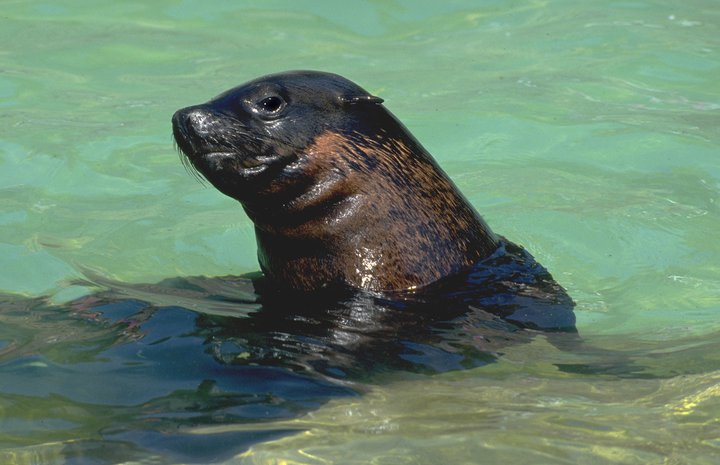
Gaston the seal

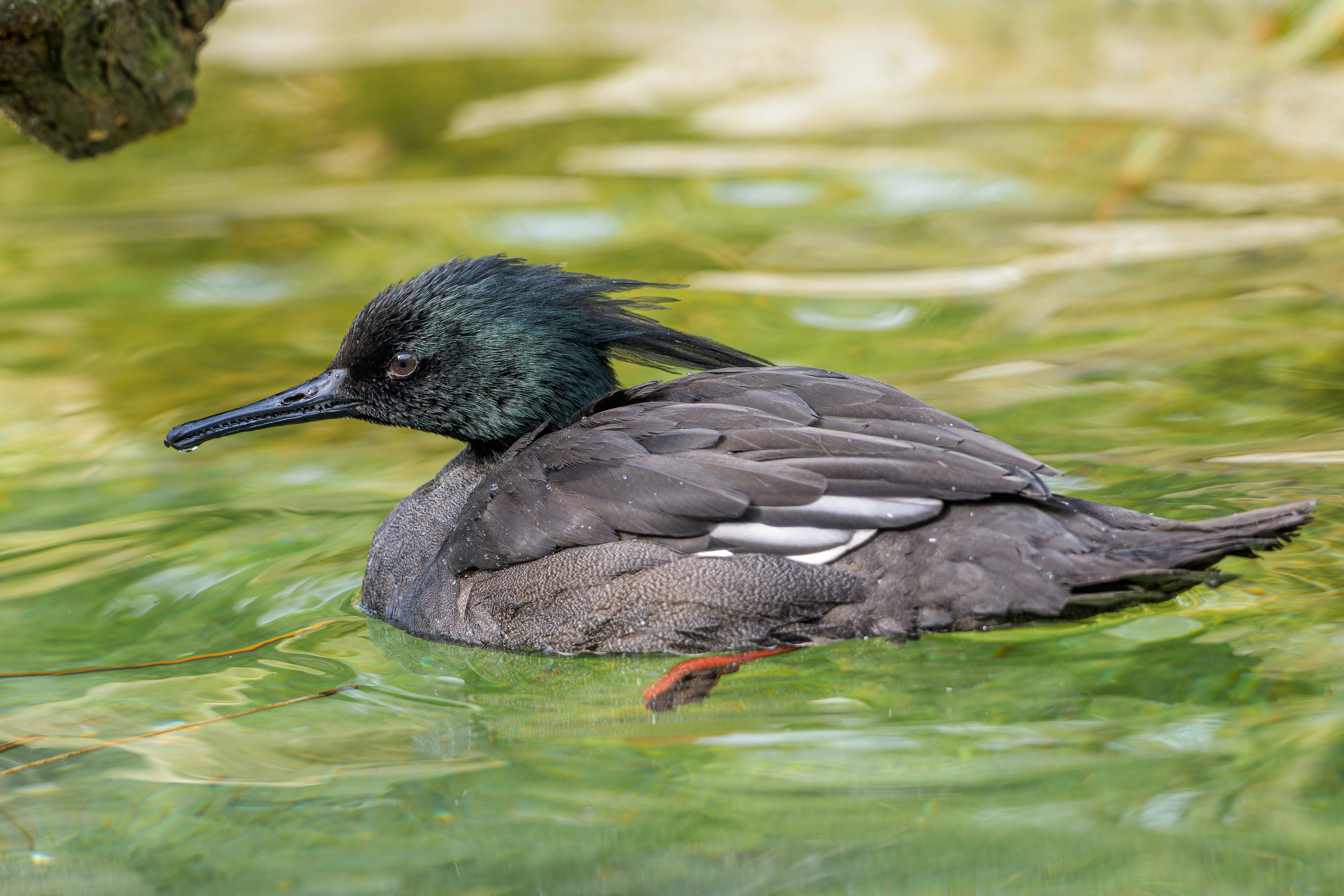
Brazilian merganser in Prague Zoo
