= Afrikaner cattle =

Breed of cattle

Afrikaner
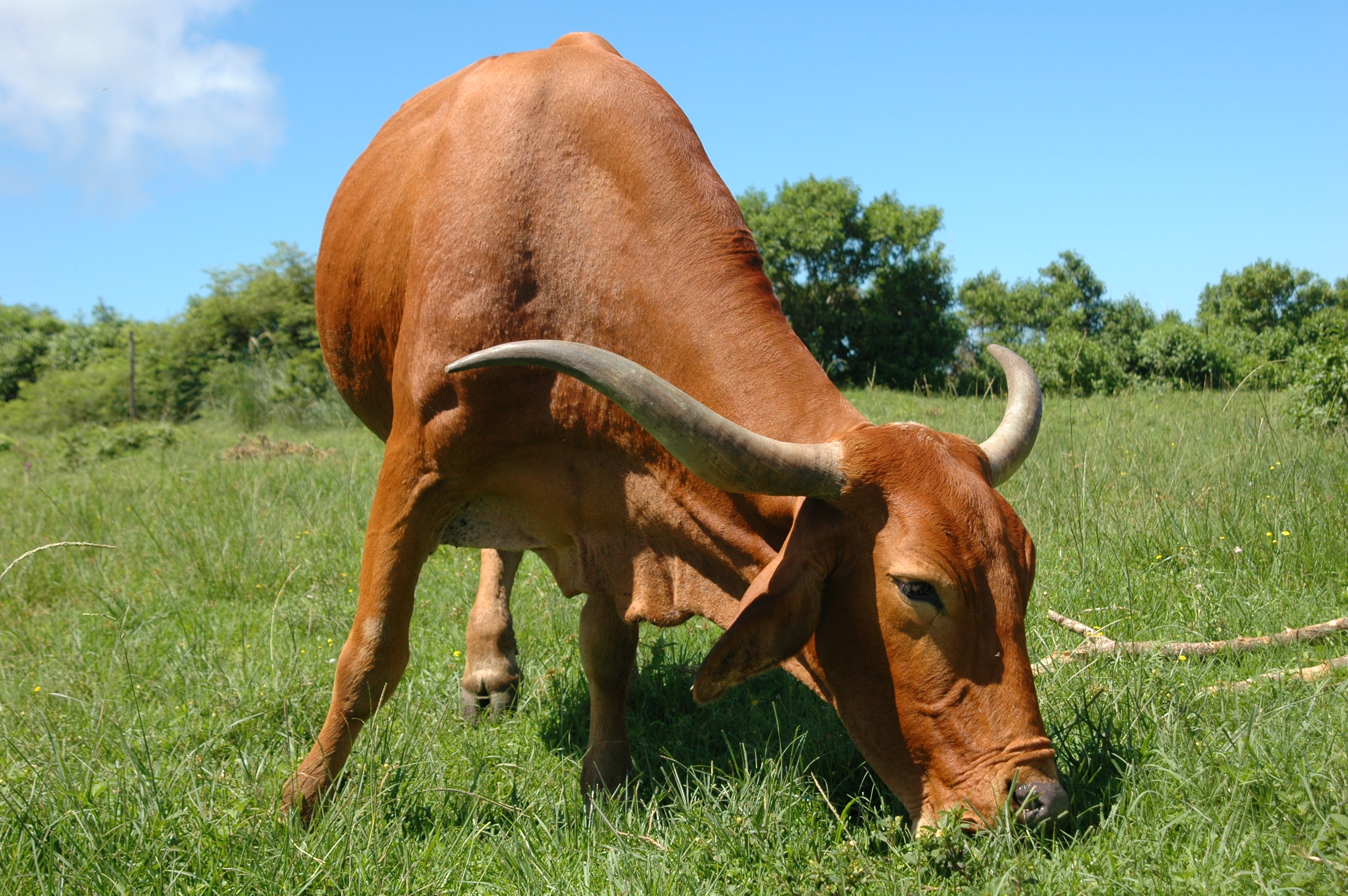
- A cow in Transkei
- Other names: Africander; Afrikander
- Country of origin: South Africa
- Distribution: nine African countries
- Use: beef

Traits
- Weight: Male: average 745–955 kg; to over 1100 kg; Female: average 525–640 kg; to over 800 kg
- Height: Male: average 143 cm; Female: average 115 cm
- Coat: usually dark red; light red and yellow also seen
- Horn status: long lateral horns; polled variant

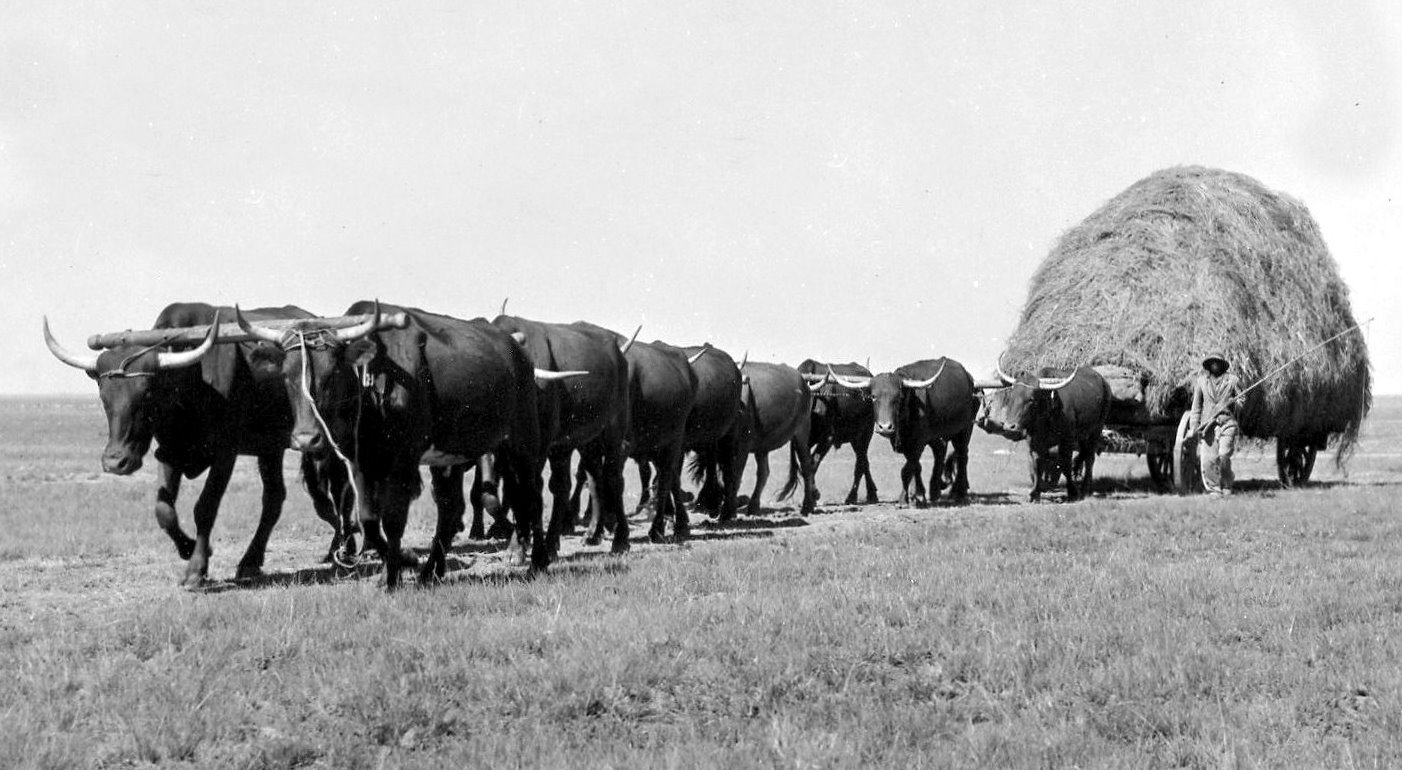
An Afrikander ox train in the Orange Free State

The Afrikaner or Africander is an African breed of taurine-indicine cattle in the Sanga group of African cattle. It is derived from the cattle of the Khoikhoi (Hottentot) people which were already present in the area of modern South Africa when the Dutch East India Company established the Cape Colony in 1652.

== History ==
The Afrikaner shares ancestry with the Nguni and Drakensberger breeds, from which it may have diverged some 655–960 years ago. Anecdotal evidence from Portuguese sailors suggests that herds of Afrikaner-like cattle had been kept by the Khoikhoi since at least the fifteenth century.

The breed almost became extinct at the time of the Second Boer War (1899–1902) as a result both of wartime destruction and of a rinderpest outbreak of that halved the total cattle population of the country. Steps were taken to improve the breed after the war.

A stud-book was started in 1912; as numbers were depleted, there was a high degree of inbreeding at this time.

Export to the United States was proposed in 1923, and a herd was shipped to the Gulf Coast in 1932. In 1929, a bull and two cows (one a calf) were gifted to the King George V by the Africander Cattle Breeders' Society of South Africa. Five of the cattle were sent in 1953 from Texas and Florida to the Commonwealth Scientific and Industrial Research Organisation in Belmont, Australia, for research into their adaptability to the Australian climate.

During the first half of the twentieth century, Afrikaners were being bred to reduce the size of their hump, as this was unsightly to farmers used to the taurine cattle shape.

The Afrikaner was the most abundant cattle breed in South Africa until the 1970s, when numbers fell as a result of inbreeding, lowered fertility and decreased reproductive period in cows; crossbreeding with exotic cattle breeds and the introduction of the Brahman to southern Africa may also have contributed to the decline.

Afrikaner cattle have about 4% European ancestry.

== Characteristics ==
Afrikaners are usually deep red. They have the small cervical-thoracic hump typical of Sanga cattle.

The Afrikaner is a well-muscled animal, with long legs and a shallow body. The horns are long and lateral, variable in both shape and placement; there is a polled variant. Average weights are variously reported at 745 kg or 955 kg for bulls, and at 525 kg or 640 kg for cows; bulls may grow to over 1100 kg, and cows to more than 800 kg. Average heights at the withers are 143 cm and 115 cm respectively.

The legs are slightly sickle shaped. They have good resistance to tick-borne diseases. They are well adapted to the local hot, arid conditions, as the sweat glands in their skin are more active than those of taurine cattle. This makes them more tolerant of heat than European breeds. They are more economical to keep, and a greater number of Afrikaners can be kept on the same plot of land as European cattle. They have a good temperament and are easy to handle.

Afrikaners have good fertility, and can continue to calve over the age of 16 years, with records showing cows calving at 21. The cows are very maternal, and one female will often care for a number of calves while their mothers graze elsewhere. They have few calving problems, due to the structure of their hindquarters and small calf sizes (30–35 kg). They have a low calf mortality rate.

There is a medium to high degree of genetic variation within this breed with a low inbreeding coefficient, despite the historic decline in numbers.

== Uses ==
The Khoikhoi used the Afrikaners for meat and milk. Afrikaners were used primarily as draught animals after European settlement, often driven in large teams with as many as 14 animals. They were bred and developed to better suit this purpose, and were prized by the voortrekkers. They were also used as dairy cows, though less commonly, producing higher butterfat contents than other cattle breeds, without the need for supplementary feed. It was Afrikaner oxen which drew the wagons that carried the Voortrekkers on the Great Trek.

Afrikaners are used commercially to produce beef, and are often crossbred with other breeds in order to improve meat quality, particularly in regards to tenderness, as well as their greater ability to add weight on poor quality forage. The South African breed society promotes the use of Afrikaners as a dam line for crossbreeding, which may increase heat tolerance in taurine breeds.

The Bonsmara was developed during the 1960s by crossing Afrikaners with Herefords and Shorthorns, while the Belmont Red results of similar crossbreeding by CSIRO in Rockhampton, Queensland, in an effort to improve beef production in hot, dry areas. The Afrigus is a modern 50–50 hybrid of Afrikaner and Aberdeen Angus, with some influence of Bonsmara, Drakensberger and Tuli. An Afrikaner–Angus cross developed in the 1930s in Louisiana – sometimes called Africangus – was unsuccessful.
