= Warrior =

Person specializing in combat or warfare

A warrior is a guardian specializing in combat or warfare, especially within the context of a tribal or clan-based warrior culture society that recognizes a separate warrior aristocracy, class, or caste.

== History ==
Warriors seem to have been present in the earliest pre-state societies. Scholars have argued that horse-riding Yamnaya warriors from the Pontic–Caspian steppe played a key role during the Indo-European migrations and the diffusion of Indo-European languages across Eurasia. Most of the basic weapons used by warriors appeared before the rise of most hierarchical systems. Bows and arrows, clubs, spears, swords, and other edged weapons were in widespread use. However, with the new findings of metallurgy, the aforementioned weapons had grown in effectiveness.

When the first hierarchical systems evolved 5,000 years ago, the gap between the rulers and the ruled had increased. Making war to extend the outreach of their territories, rulers often forced men from lower orders of society into the military role. That had been the first use of professional soldiers, a distinct difference from the warrior communities.

The warrior ethic in many societies later became the preserve of the ruling class. Egyptian pharaohs would depict themselves in war chariots, shooting at enemies, or smashing others with clubs. Fighting was considered a prestigious activity but only when associated with status and power. European mounted knights would often feel contempt for the foot soldiers recruited from lower classes. In Mesoamerican societies of pre-Columbian America, the elite aristocratic soldiers remained separated from the lower classes of stone-throwers. The samurai were the hereditary military nobility and officer caste of Japan from the 12th to the late 19th century.

In contrast to the beliefs of the caste and clan-based warrior, who saw war as a place to attain valor and glory, warfare was a practical matter that could change the course of history. That was the approach of the Roman legions, which had only the incentive of promotion, as well as a strict level of discipline. When Europe's standing armies of the 17th and the 18th centuries developed, discipline was at the core of their training. Officers had the role of transforming men that they viewed as lower class to become reliable fighting men.

Inspired by the Ancient Greek ideals of the 'citizen soldier', many European societies during the Renaissance began to incorporate conscription and raise armies from the general populace. A change in attitude was noted as well, as officers were told to treat their soldiers with moderation and respect. For example, men who fought in the American Civil War often elected their own officers. With the mobilization of citizens in the armies sometimes reaching the millions, societies often made efforts in order to maintain or revive the warrior spirit. That trend continues to the modern day. Due to the heroic connotations of the term "warrior", this metaphor is especially popular in publications advocating or recruiting for a country's military.

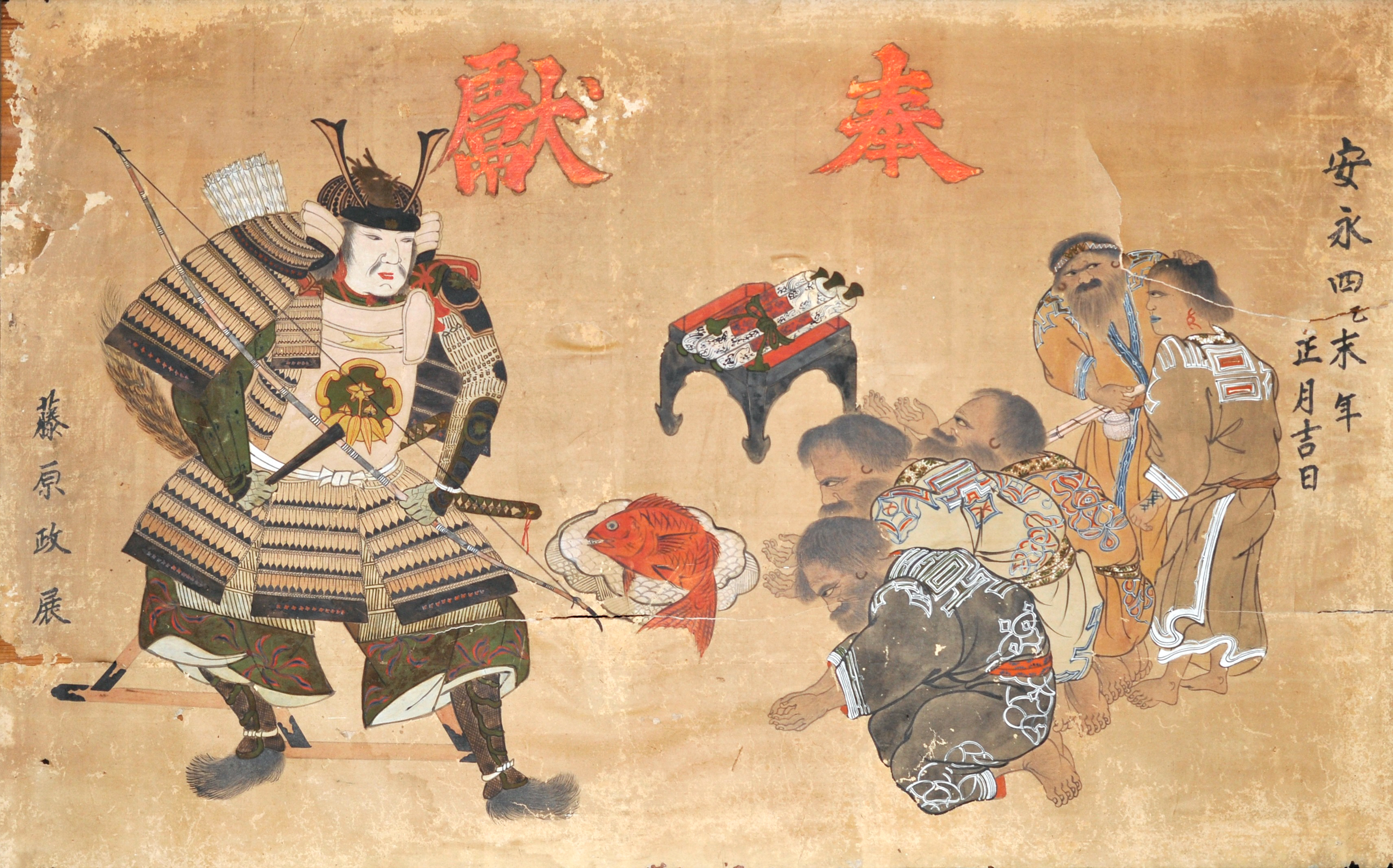
Samurai, member of the Japanese warrior caste

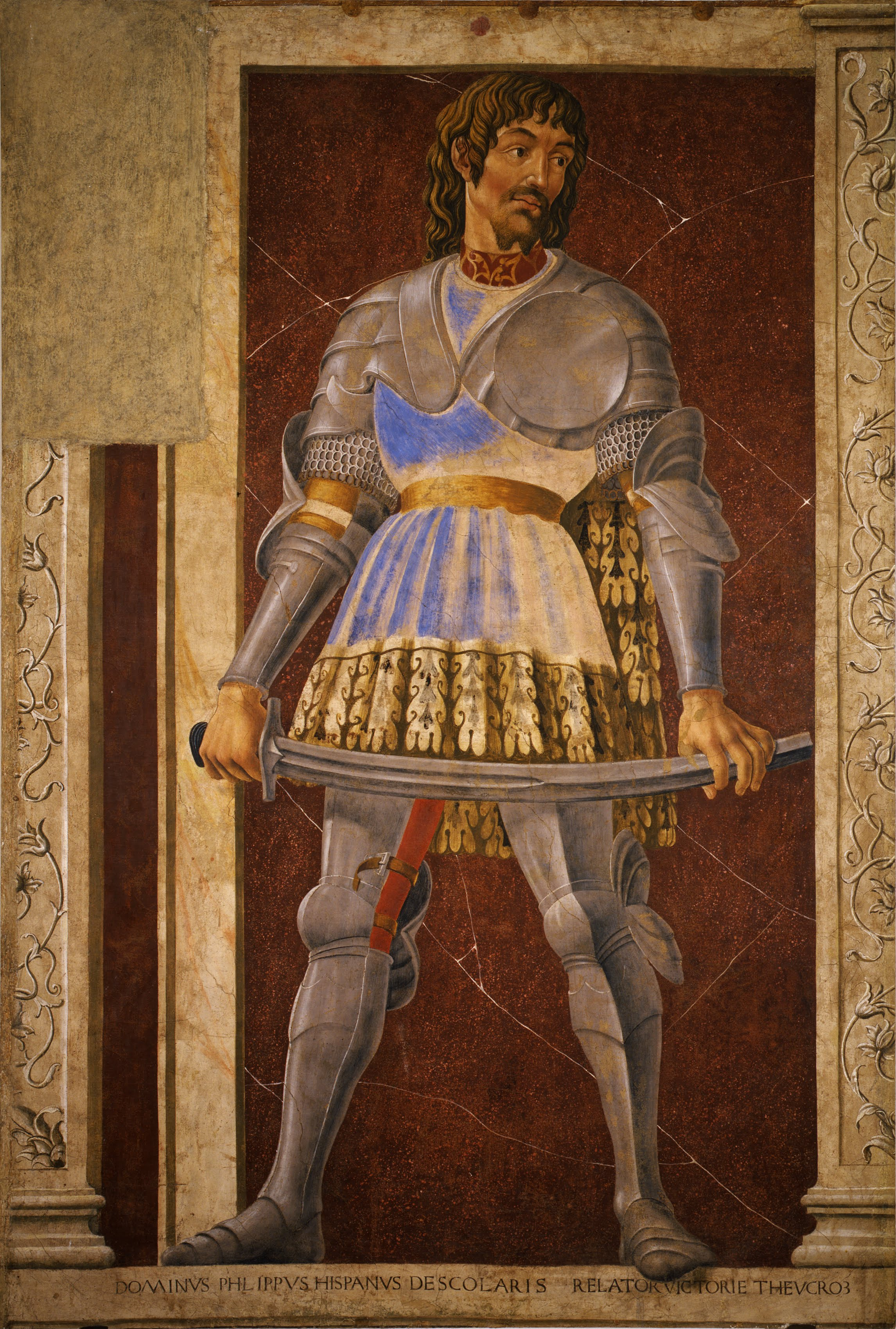
14th-century knight Pippo Spano, member of the Order of the Dragon

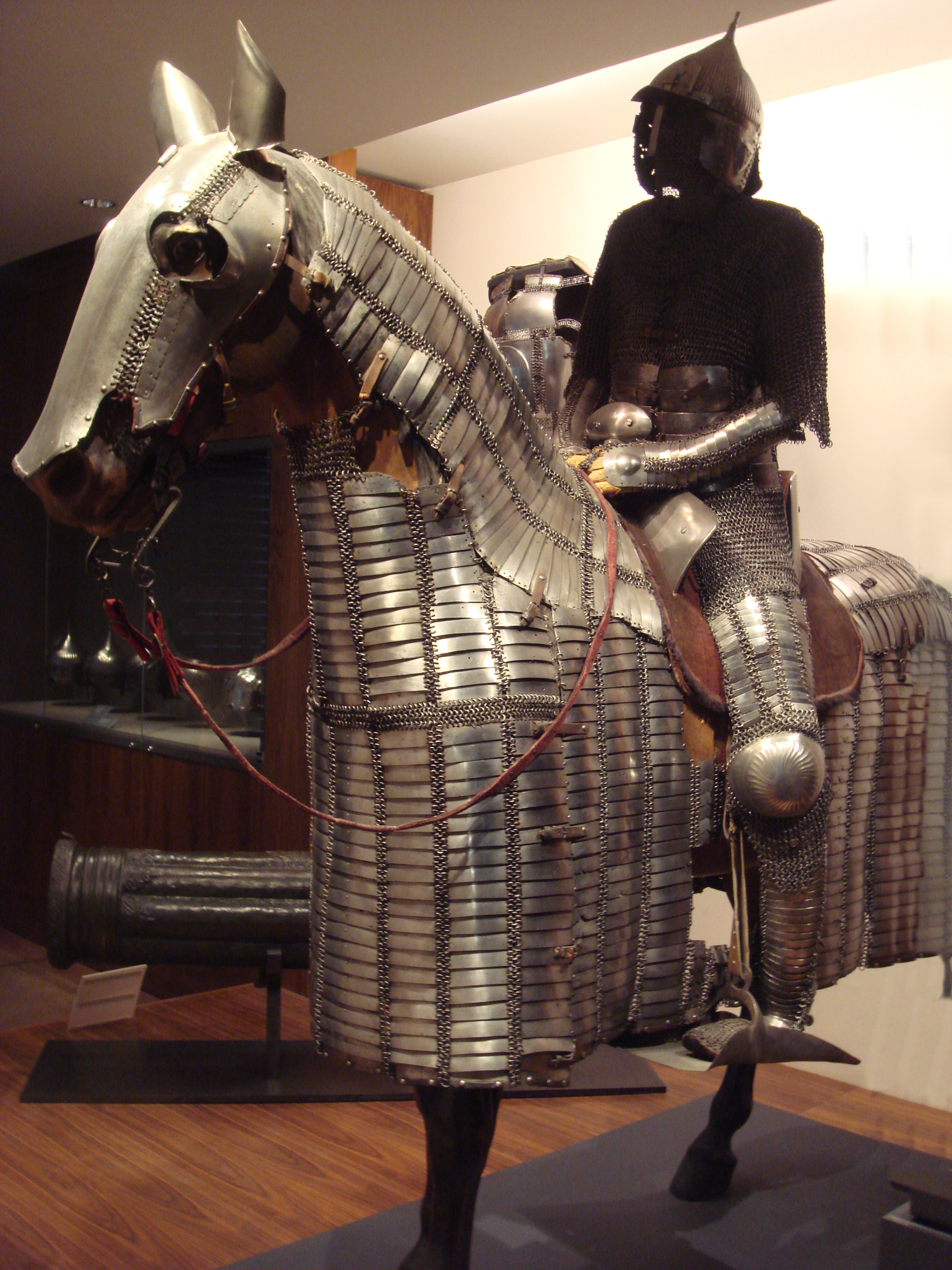
Ottoman Mamluk warrior (c. 1550)

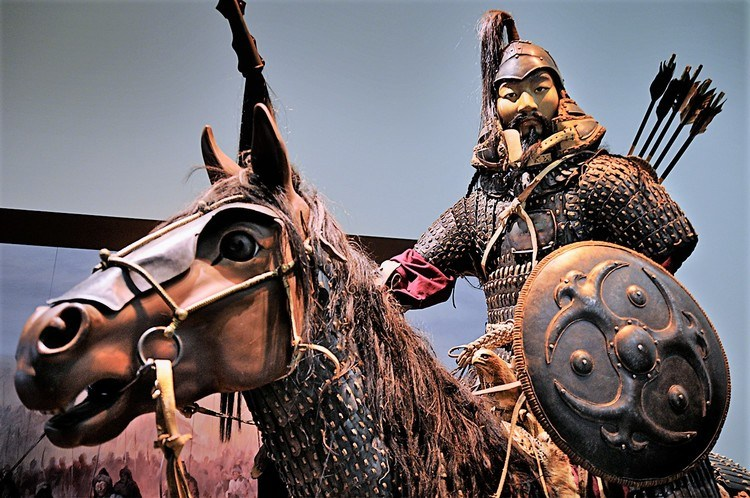
Recreation of a mounted warrior from the Mongol Empire

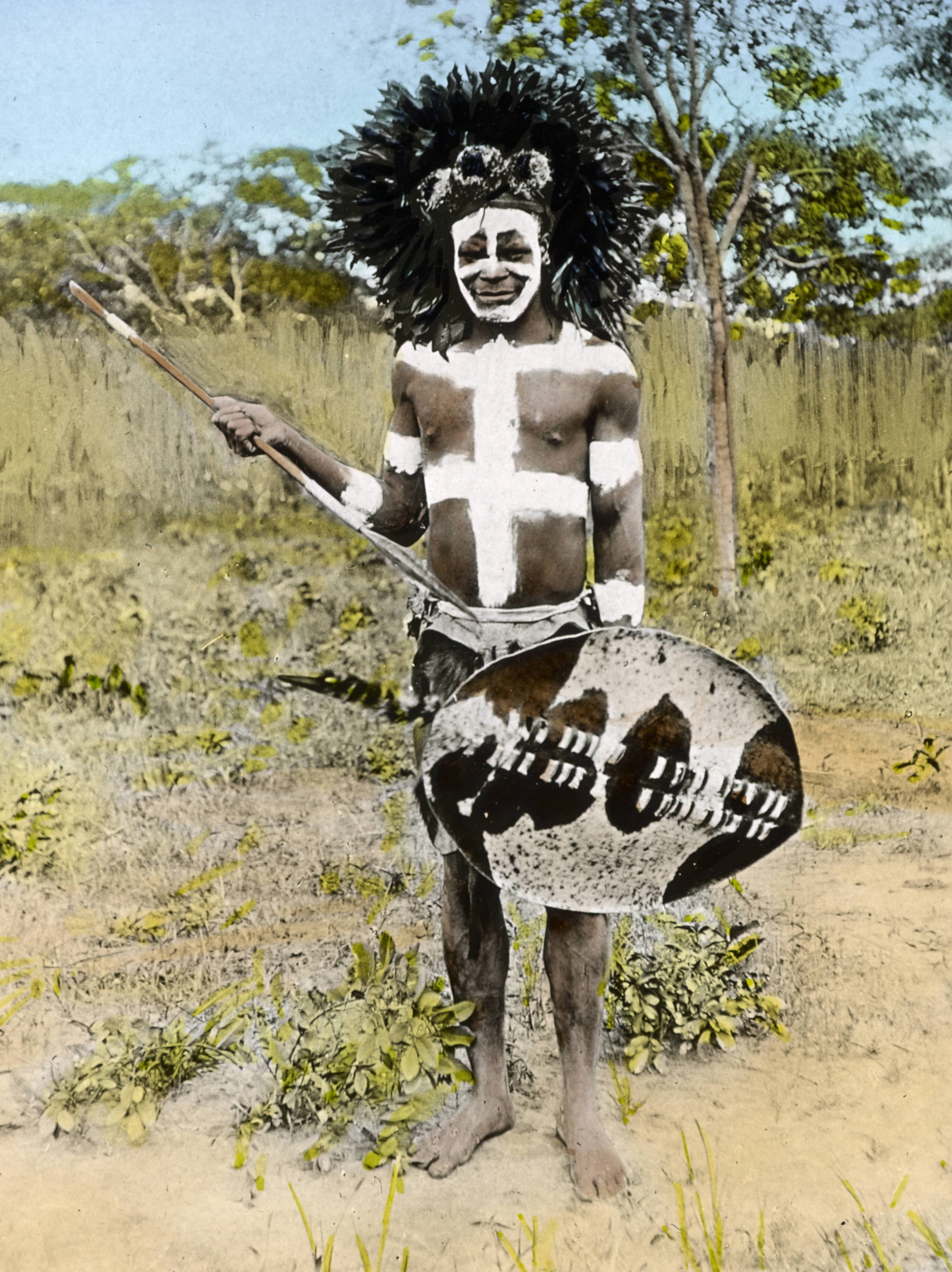
Photograph of a Ngoni warrior with nguni shield c. 1895

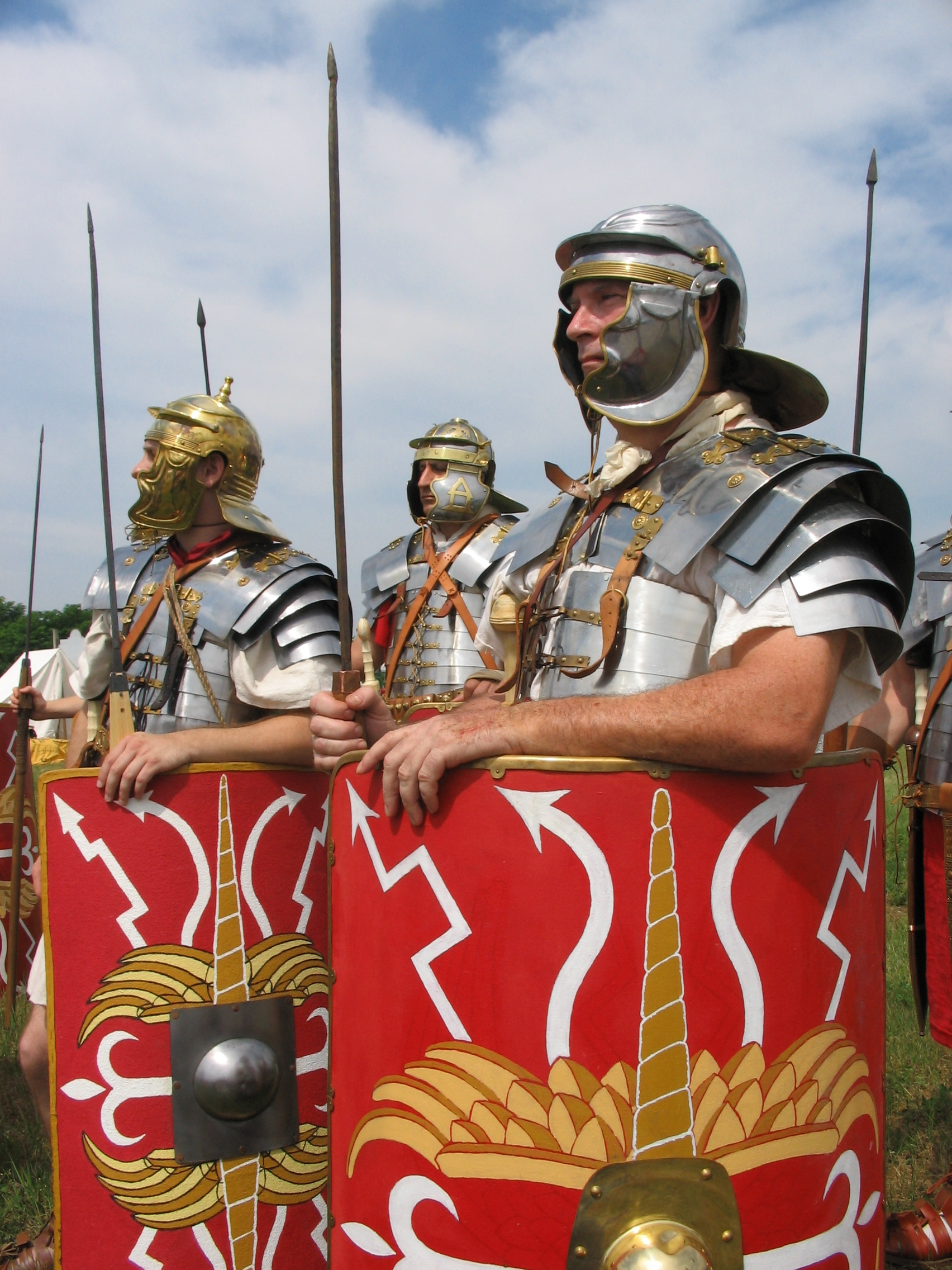
A recreation of Roman legionaries wearing the lorica segmentata, 1st–3rd century

== See also ==
- Women warriors in literature and culture
- Endemic warfare
- Deadliest Warrior
- Feud
- Honour
- Martial races
- Soldier
- Warg

== Bibliography ==
- Ayvazyan A. "The Code of Honor of the Armenian Military (4-5th centuries)" (2000).
- Shannon E. French, Code of the Warrior - Exploring Warrior Values Past and Present (2003).
