= Hump (anatomy) =

Anatomical structure in animals

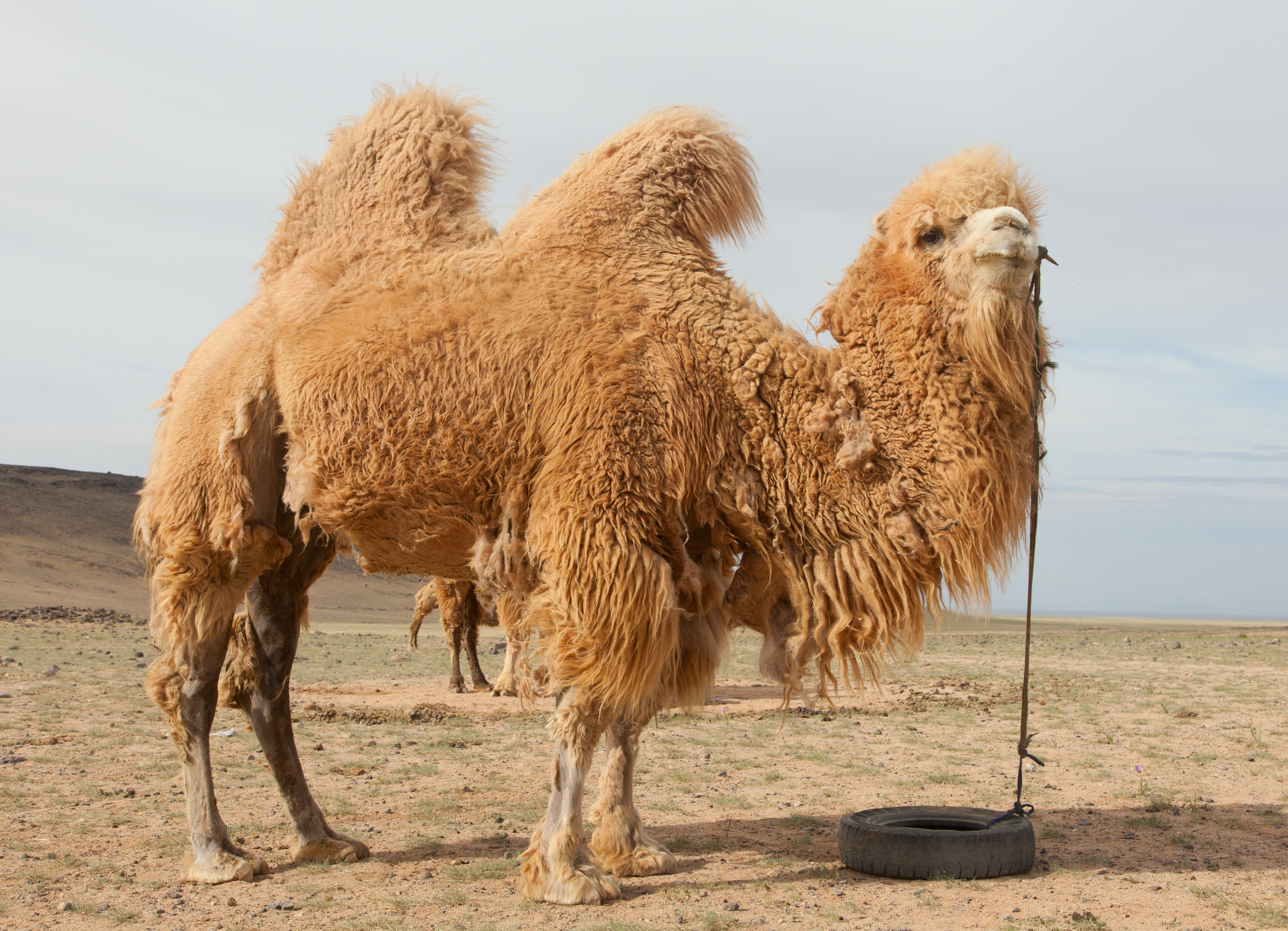
A bactrian camel. This species has two distinct humps, compared to the dromedary, which has one.

A hump is a round mass of fat or muscle that occurs naturally in many animal species, especially in mammals. Humps often serve as fat reserves, allowing the animal to survive without food for extended periods of time. A hump can also help an animal to regulate body heat in hot climates. Some humps consist of muscle instead of fat, which can help the animal dig through hard soil, hold up a heavy head, or maneuver around in snow.

== Morphology ==
An animal's hump is formed by neural spines on the thoracic vertebrae. Despite only being known from the fossil record, the woolly mammoth and species of the genus Titanotylopus are assumed to have had humps due to the presence of such spines in their skeletons. In the gaur, the hump is formed solely because of the skeletal structure, as its third to eleventh vertebrae have such spines. In both dromedaries and bactrian camels, humps are attached to the adipose tissue in the dorsal region, and fixed in place by the trapezius and rhomboid muscles.

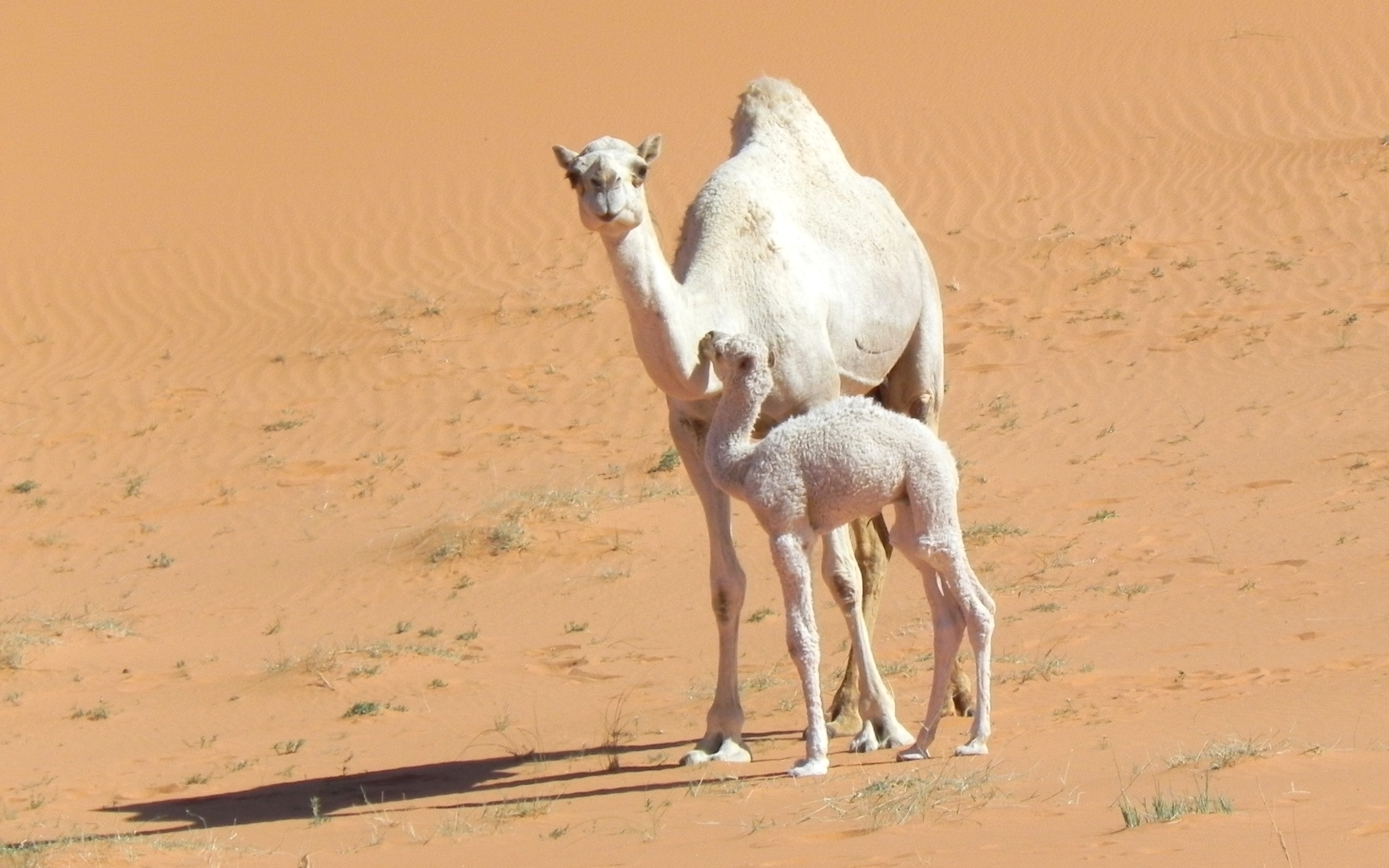
A female dromedary, or one-humped camel, with her newborn. Note that the newborn has not yet developed its hump.

Humps which mostly contain fat can shrink or disappear depending on conditions. When camels are born, the humps are small and may appear deflated, but will grow as the calf begins to eat solid food. Adult camels that suffer extreme stress, such as heavy parasite loads, may lose their humps due to depletion of fat reserves. Captive plains bison may arch their backs (or "hump up") as a stress response, especially if in close confinement, which can create the illusion that their actual hump is much lower at the shoulders.

Humps can take different forms, even between closely related species. The dromedary camel has only one hump, while the bactrian camel has two. This may be due to differences in fat metabolism rates, as the two-humped bactrian evolved lipid metabolism more rapidly. Yaks have humps comparable to the breastbone of a bird, while zebus have lump-like humps; when the two are crossbred, the yak's hump gene is dominant over the zebu's.

In some cattle breeds, like the Drakensberger and Nguni, the hump is sexually dimorphic, with only bulls having one. In other breeds, like the Boran, both sexes have a hump, but it is larger in the male.

== Kinds of humps ==
=== Fat ===
Most of a camel's fat is stored in its hump, which can weigh up to 80 pounds (36.3 kg). This fat store allows it to go long periods of time without eating. If a camel continuously uses its fat stores without replenishing, the humps will eventually become flaccid in appearance. The hump also aids with heat regulation, as nearly all of its fat is stored in the hump, as opposed to even distribution throughout the body. During the day, the camel's hump stores heat, which is then dissipated through the camel's body at night, allowing for better retention of water compared to other thermoregulation methods.

=== Muscle ===
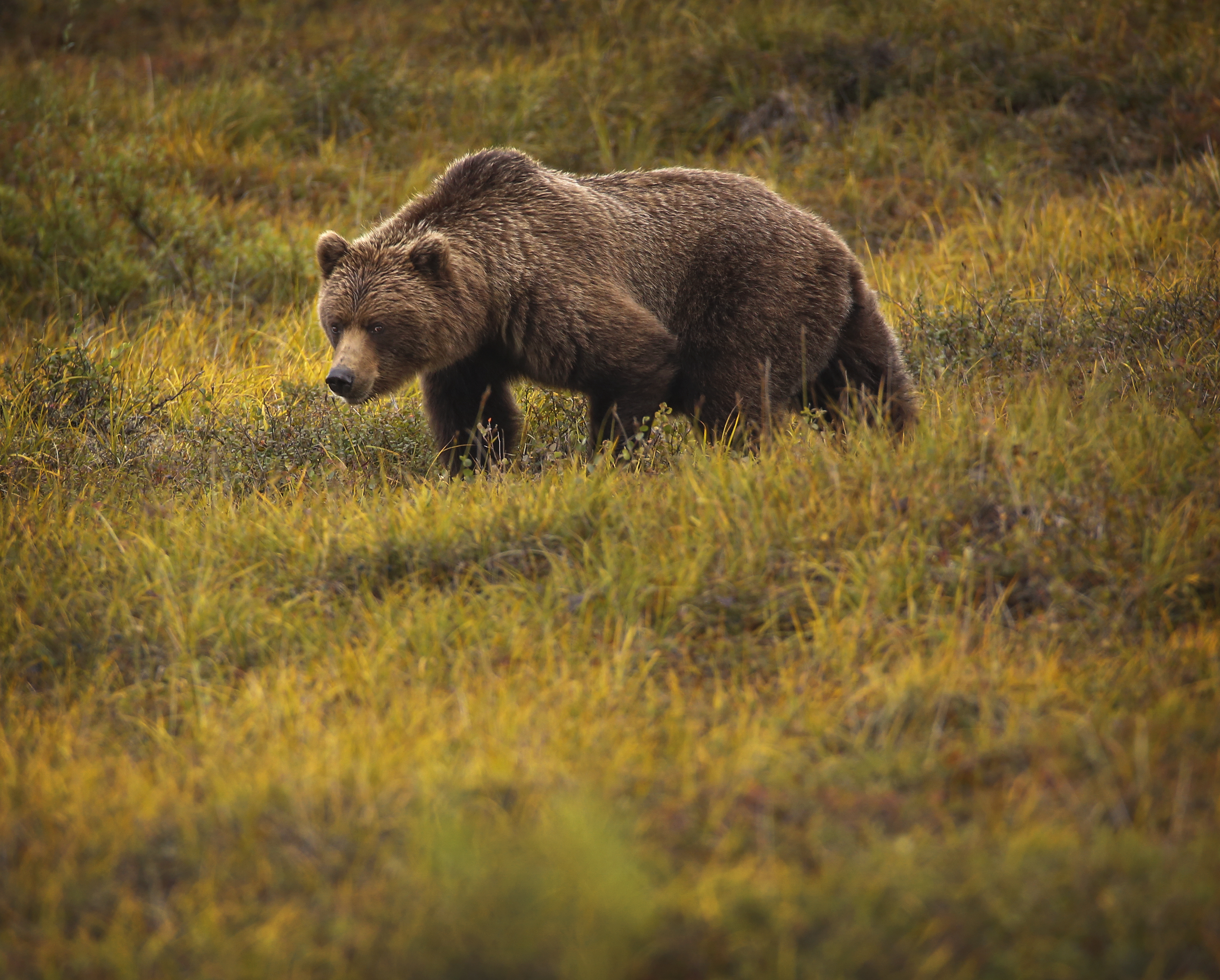
The grizzly bear has a distinct hump between its shoulders, made out of muscle.

The brown bear has a hump between its shoulders, a distinction from other bear species. This hump is formed by large muscles, allowing for a wide range of motion, which the bear mainly uses to put pressure on the soil as it digs for food. The bison also has a hump between its shoulders, made almost entirely of muscle and supported by long skeletal spines. The bison hump's purpose is to hold up the animal's large head, and also enables the animal to use its head as a snow shovel in the winter, swinging it side to side with its hump muscles. Such foraging behavior sets the bison apart from other ungulates, which typically use their feet to scrape away snow. Moose, similarly, have a shoulder hump of muscle that is necessary to hold up their large head and, in males, antlers.

=== Other hump types ===
A common misconception says that camels store water in their humps. This is not true, however; as stated above, the humps store fat. If a camel is under stress, it will extract water from its rumen. The fat reserves themselves keep the camel from becoming thirsty, allowing for greater conservation of water.

== Non-mammalian humps ==
=== Dinosaurs ===
It has been theorized that the neural spines of Spinosaurus, Ouranosaurus, and other dinosaurs with similar spines had humps, rather than the sailfins they are commonly depicted as having. If true, such humps would aid with heat regulation, storing of lipids for egg production, and storing fat for long migrations. Concavenator corcovatus is named for its hump (the name means "hunchback hunter from Cuenca"), but its use is debated, with theories including heat regulartion, attracting mates, intimidating rivals, or fat storage.

=== Fish ===
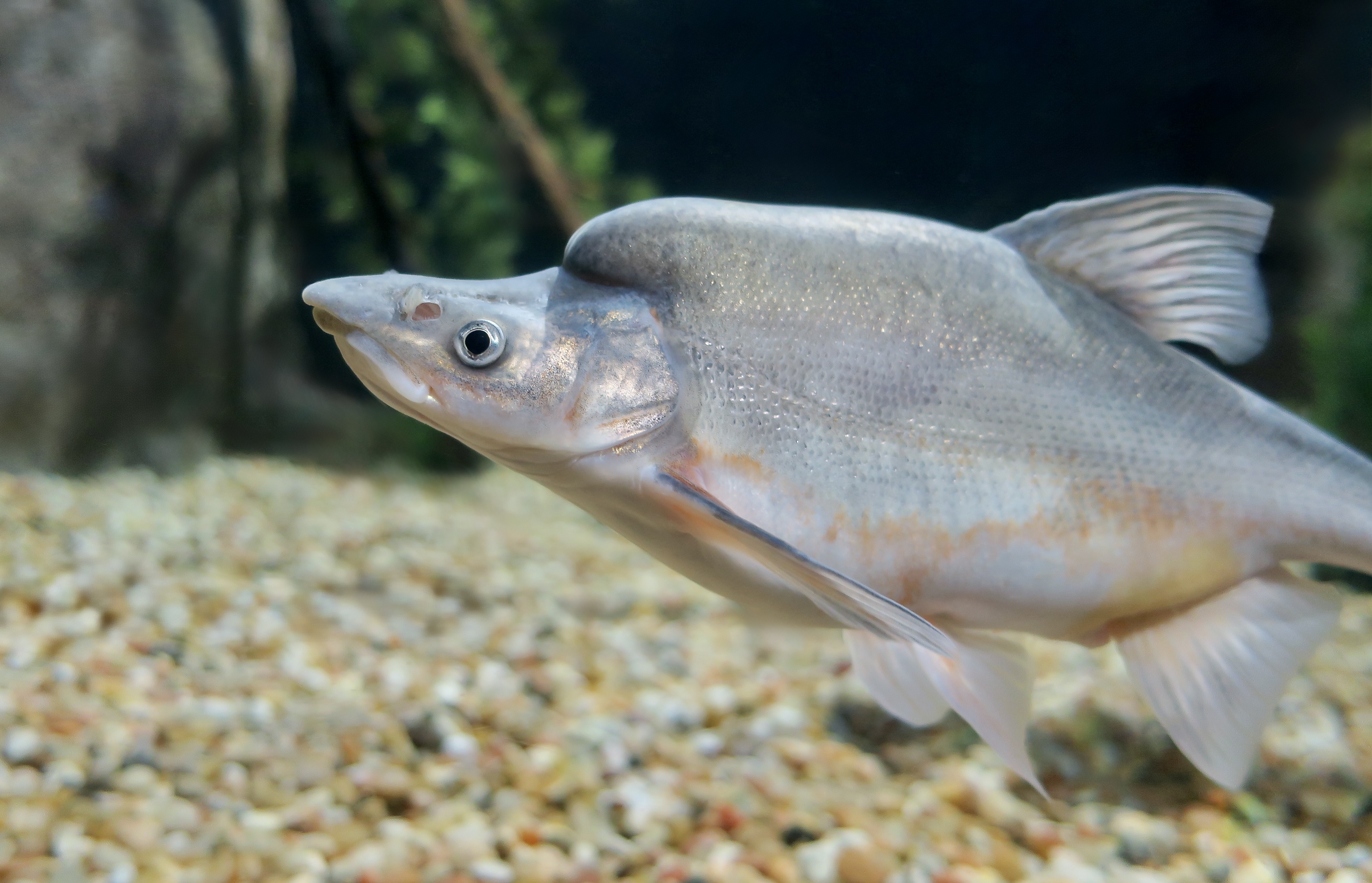
The humpback chub is an example of a fish that has a hump.

Some fish species have humps, with their makeup varying. The nuchal hump of a humpback chub (from which the species gets its name) is made up almost entirely of skeletal muscle, and may exist to reduce the chub's vulnerability to predators. The flowerhorn cichlid is an ornamental aquarium fish which is bred for its very large nuchal hump. Some breeders may artificially increase the hump's size by injecting it with hormones or feeding the flowerhorn a hormone-rich diet.

Male salmon of the Oncorhynchus genus have dorsal humps, which were once thought to consist of cartilage, but is now known to be formed by increases in connective tissues and neural spine growth. Of this genus, sockeye and pink salmon develop the biggest humps, which are mostly made of connective tissue and which decrease in lipid content with age. In contrast, the closely related masu and chum salmon have smaller humps that are mostly formed by bone tissue.

== Hinderance ==
A hump can cause stress on the spine. In brown bears, a hump may cause lesions on the cranial thoracic vertebrae, the vertebra most directly near it. Captive bears with such a condition are usually euthanized. The gudaali is a zebu breed developed in Africa, which, compared to other breeds, has a smaller body and larger hump. This combination makes locomotion difficult for the animal.

Zebu cows with especially large humps may have reduced fertility.

== In human culture ==
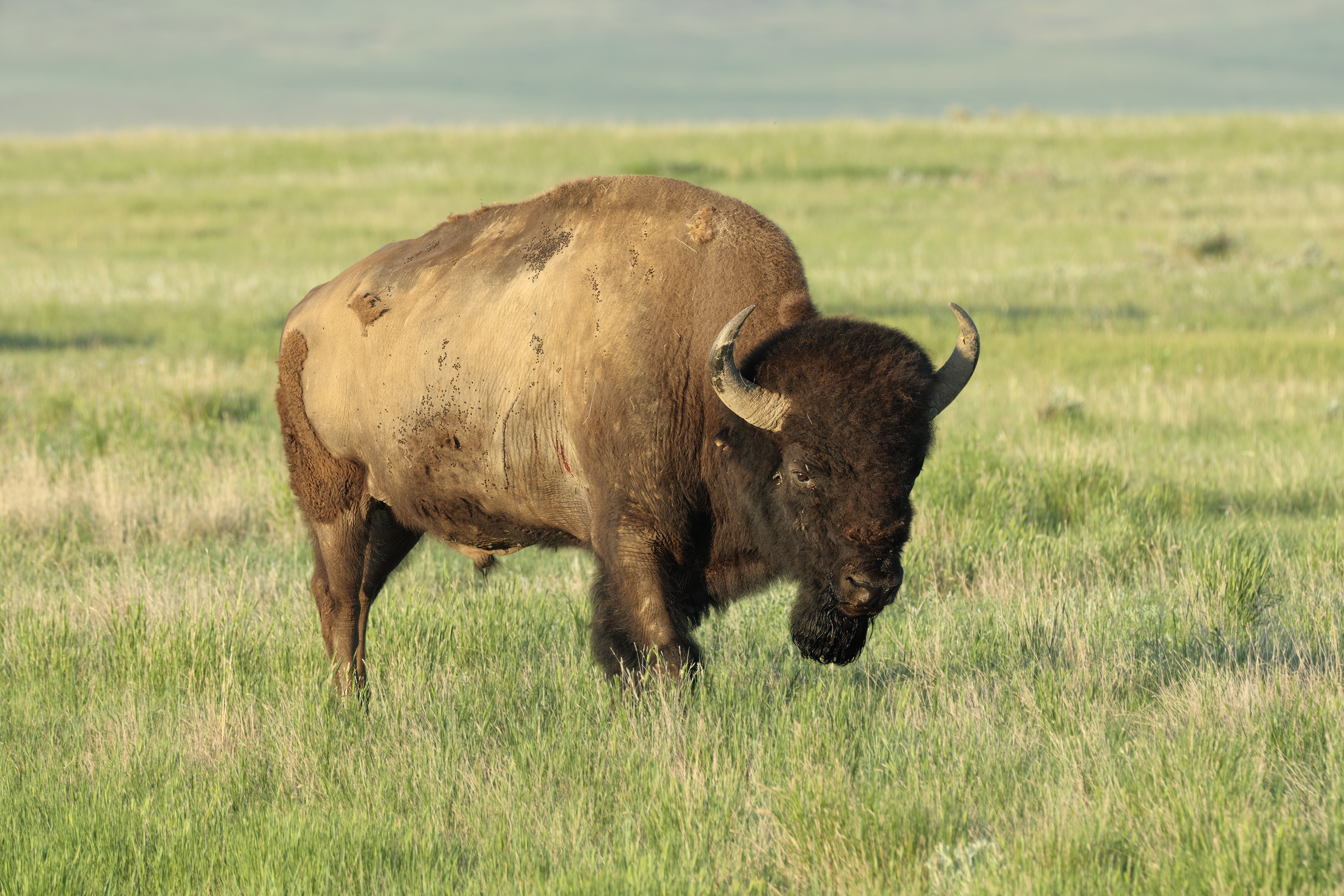
The plains bison has a hump of muscle, which holds up its large head and helps it shovel snow in the winter.

Humped animals appear in some cave paintings, which is of interest to paleontologists, who can use such depictions to better understand what extinct fauna looked like. Some cave paintings depict woolly mammoths as being humped, which is corroborated by the humps present on frozen specimens. Similarly, the cave bear is depicted as having a shoulder hump in some French cave paintings. Because of how prominently humps are drawn, it has been theorized that ancient painters used the hump as the starting point when drawing.

Humps may not be accurately created in taxidermy. William Temple Hornaday lamented that when stuffing plains bison, there is a tendency to make the hump "a huge, thick, rounded mass like the hump of a dromedary," as opposed to the "high and sharp" muscle hump that bison actually have.

The fat humps of camels are a source of meat in some cultures. Khlii, a camel meat dish from Algeria, is prepared in a mixture of fat from the camel's hump and kidneys. Camel hump fat is high in saturated fatty acids, with as much as 64.4% of the hump's weight basis consisting of them, and another 33.1% of its weight basis is monounsaturated fats. Bison humps, despite consisting of muscle instead of fat, are also considered a delicacy by some; William Temple Hornaday called sliced and fried bison hump "a dish fit for the gods".

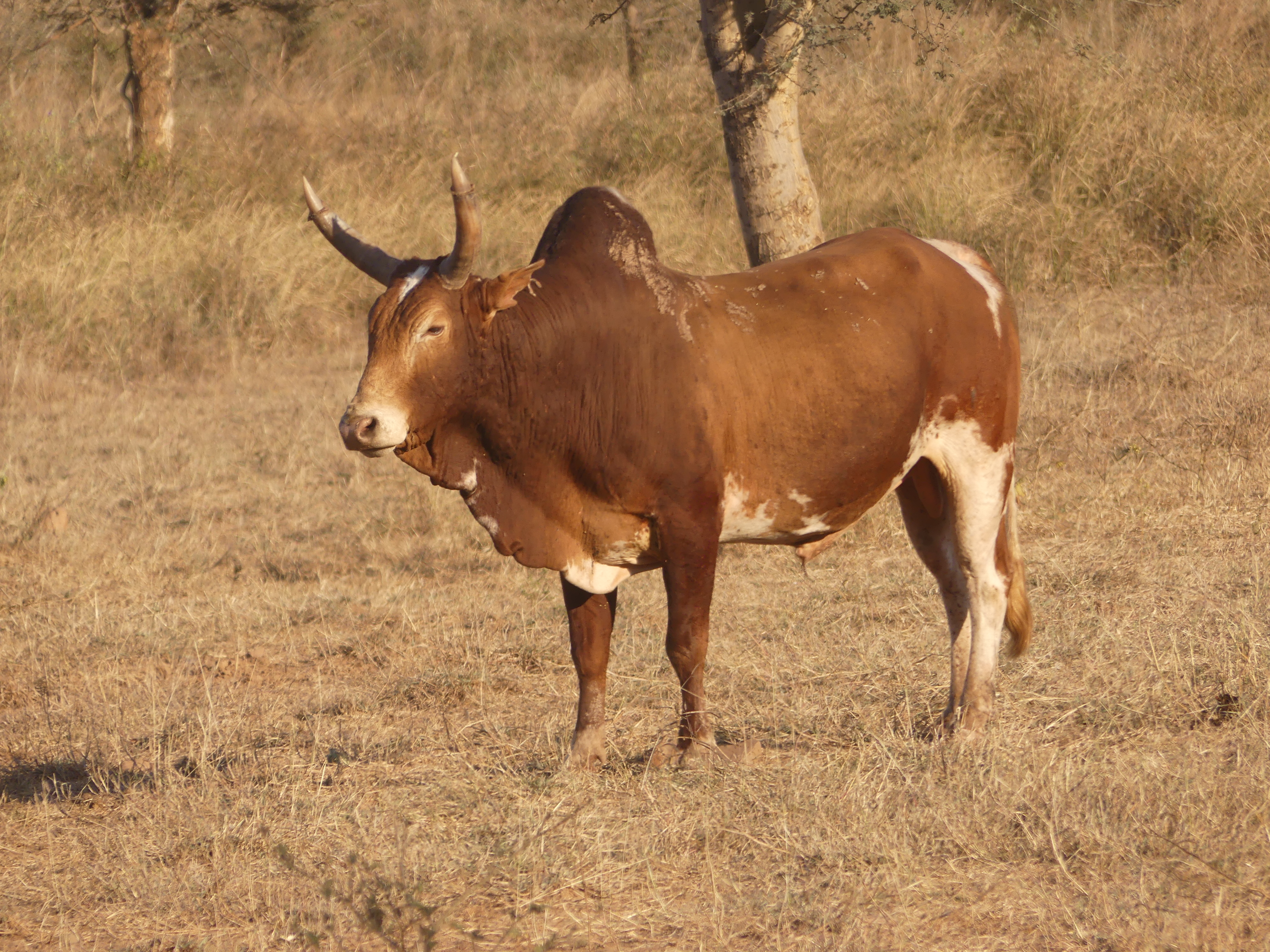
The zebu, a breed of cattle, is an example of a domesticated animal with a hump.

In markets where zebu are valued, humps can provide the breeder with higher income. In such markets, cattle may be selectively bred to have a large hump, so as to indicate a pure zebu bloodline. Siddi breeders backcross herds that have mixed too much with humpless cattle, selecting for taller bulls with larger humps, as these will be worth more than humpless bulls.

Certain landforms may be named due to their resemblance of animal humps. Camel's Hump in Vermont and Buffalo Hump in Idaho are two such examples. Humans may also take their names from animal humps, such as the Comanche war chief Buffalo Hump. Some HIV-1 patients develop a fat deposit nicknamed a "buffalo hump", though this forms on the patient's neck, as opposed to between the shoulders in an actual bison.

== See also ==
- List of animals with humps
