= Drakensberger =

South African breed of cattle

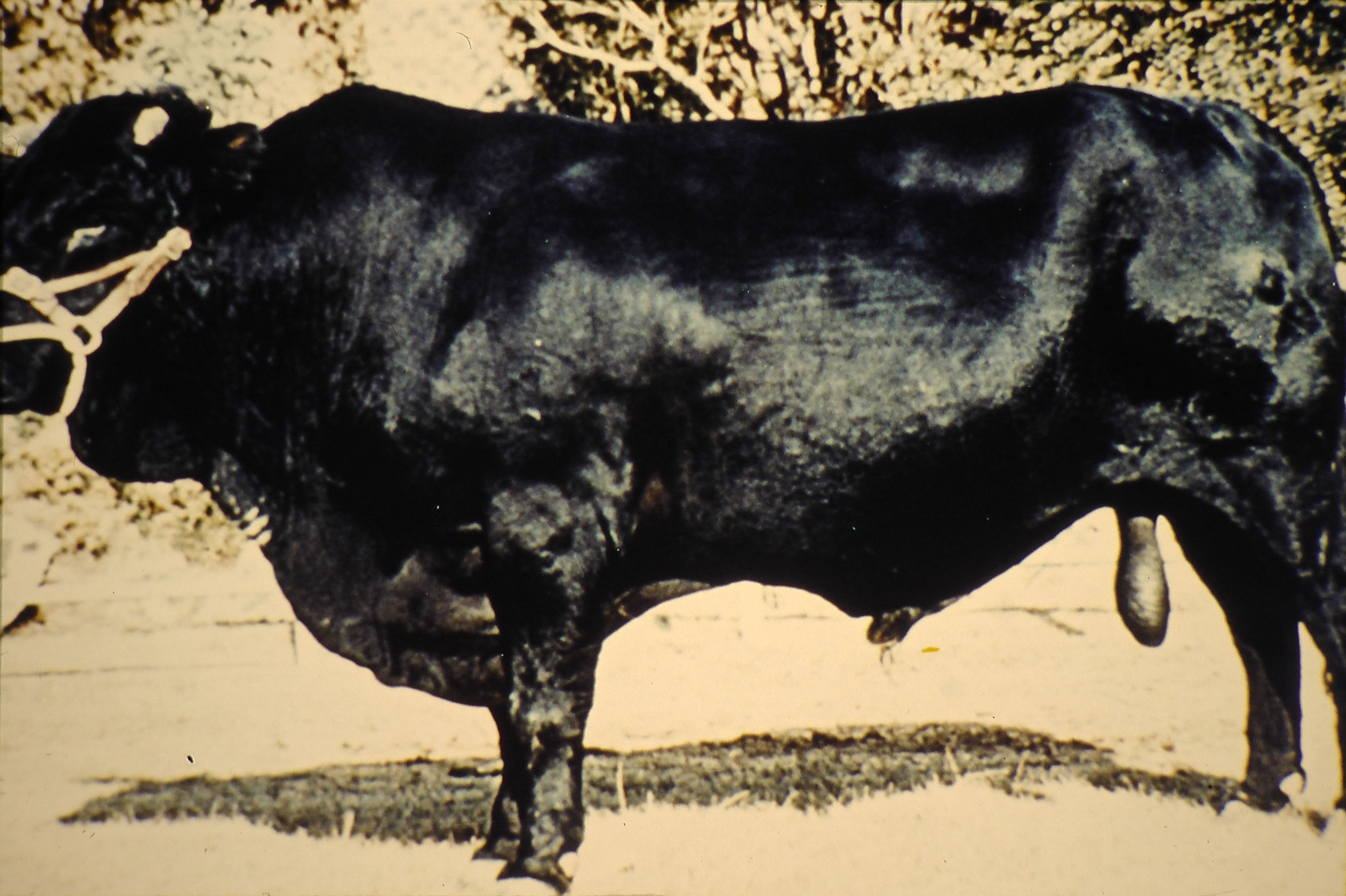
- Conservation status: FAO (2007): not at risk; DAD-IS (2022): at risk/vulnerable
- Country of origin: South Africa
- Distribution: Southern Africa, Australia
- Use: dual-purpose

Traits
- Weight: Male: 900–1100 kg; Female: 500–700 kg
- Height: 124 cm
- Cattle; Bos (primigenius) taurus

The Drakensberger is a South African breed of cattle. It is a dual-purpose breed, reared both for milk and for meat. Its origins go back to the early nineteenth century, to the time of the Great Trek or earlier, when imported European stock from Holland was cross-bred with black cattle of Sanga type obtained from nomadic pastoralist Khoikhoi peoples. It is one of several successful African composite breeds of Sanga and European stock. In the early days it was selected for adaptation to the sourveld biome of South Africa, and for black colour; it was kept principally along the Drakensberg escarpment, which gave rise to its modern name. It was established as a breed with the formation of the Drakensberger Cattle Breeders' Society in 1947.

== History ==
The origins of the Drakensberger go back to the early nineteenth century, to the time of the Great Trek or earlier, when imported European stock from Holland was cross-bred with black cattle of Sanga type obtained from nomadic pastoralist Khoikhoi peoples. These cross-breeds developed into a type or breed known as the Vaderlander; there was some selection both for black colour and for adaptation to the sourveld biome of South Africa.

After the Second Boer War of 1899–1902, during which Boer livestock was often systematically slaughtered by British troops, few Boer cattle remained. Among those surviving was a herd bred by one Cornelis Uys in the latter nineteenth century from Afrikander, Basuto, Nguni and Vaderlander stock, and known as Uysbees or Uys cattle. In the early twentieth century two cross-bred types had emerged: the Kemp from Afrikander and Freisian, and the Tintern Black from Afrikander and Nguni stock. In 1947 these were merged with the Uysbees to create the Drakensberger, for which a breed society, the Drakensberger Cattle Breeders' Society, was formed.

The Drakensberger is distributed in most provinces of South Africa, in a range extending approximately from Humansdorp in the south-west to Messina in the north-east; it is also present in Botswana, Eswatini, Lesotho and Namibia. Some embryos were sent to Australia in 2006, and a small population was established there. In that year new registrations in South Africa were approximately 5500 per year, more or less equally divided between male and female stock. In 2008 the total registered South African population numbered 13355 head in 73 herds, of which all but two were performance-recorded; in 2022 a breeding stock of 8930 cows and 2660 bulls was reported. The conservation status of the breed world-wide is 'not at risk'; for South Africa it was listed in 2023 as 'at risk/vulnerable'.

== Characteristics ==
The Drakensberger is of predominantly taurine (European cattle) type. It is of medium to large size, with body weights in the range 900–1100 kg for bulls and 500–700 kg for cows; weights in Eswatini are considerably lower, averaging 654 kg for bulls and 410 kg for cows. It is always black.

== Use ==
It is a dual-purpose breed, reared both for milk and for meat.
