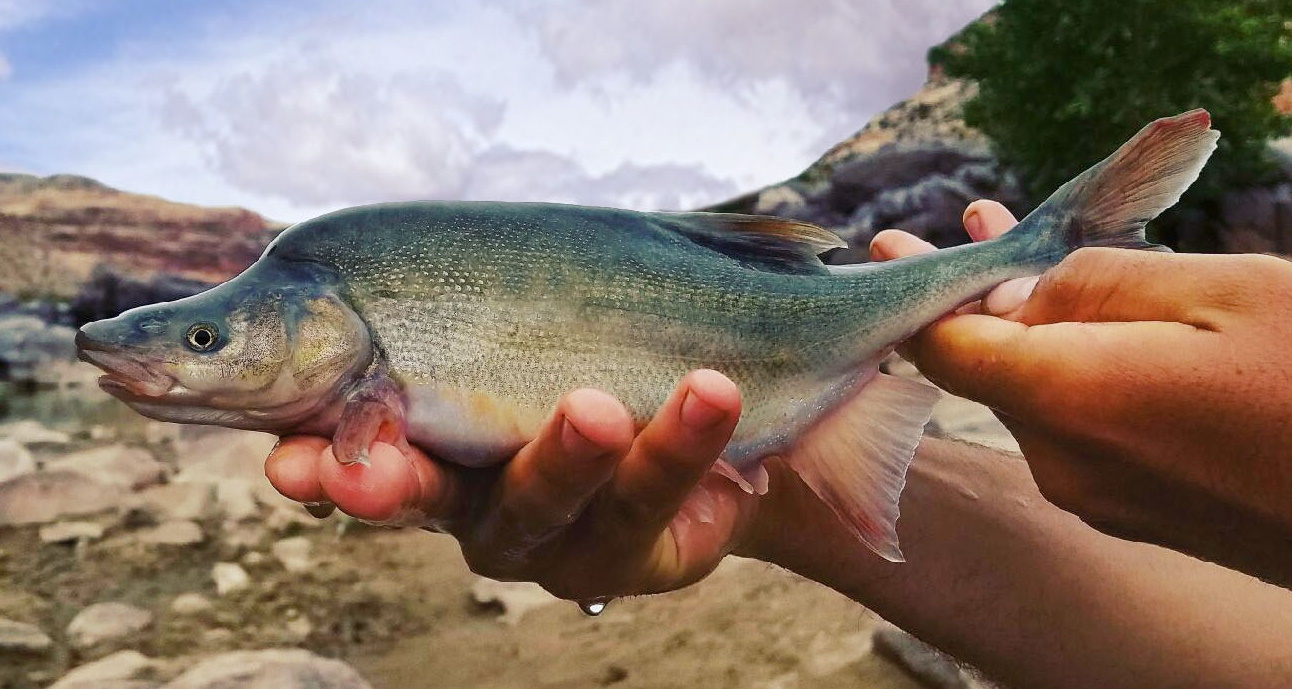

Conservation status
- Endangered (IUCN 3.1)

Scientific classification
- Kingdom: Animalia
- Phylum: Chordata
- Class: Actinopterygii
- Division: Teleostei
- Order: Cypriniformes
- Family: Leuciscidae
- Genus: Gila
- Species: G. cypha

Binomial name
- Gila cypha R. R. Miller, 1946

= Humpback chub =

Species of fish

The humpback chub (Gila cypha) is a federally protected fish that lived originally in fast waters of the Colorado River system in the United States. This species takes its name from the prominent hump between the head and dorsal fin, which is thought to direct the flow of water over the body and help maintain body position in the swift currents of the Colorado River. The body is almost entirely scaleless, retaining only about 80 midlateral scales along the lateral line. The fish is very streamlined, with a thin caudal peduncle and a deeply forked tail. The back is a light olive gray, the sides silver, and the belly white. The dorsal fin usually has 9 rays and the anal fin has 10 or more. Its maximum recorded length is 38 cm.

The humpback chub mostly consumes invertebrates and to a lesser extent other fish, at all levels from the bottom to the surface. The species spawns from April through June, at water temperatures of 19–21 °C (66–70 °F). The males develop nuptial tubercles on the head and paired fins. The fish spawn in slower-moving backwaters, typically over a substrate of cobbles or boulders. Young fish stay near shore and in quiet areas, preferring slightly more turbid water.

The humpback chub's population in the Colorado River has been reduced dramatically, primarily due to habitat loss, such as the construction of Glen Canyon Dam. The fish's status as an endangered species has inspired a number of management measures, such as altering the operation of Glen Canyon Dam and removal of non-native predators.

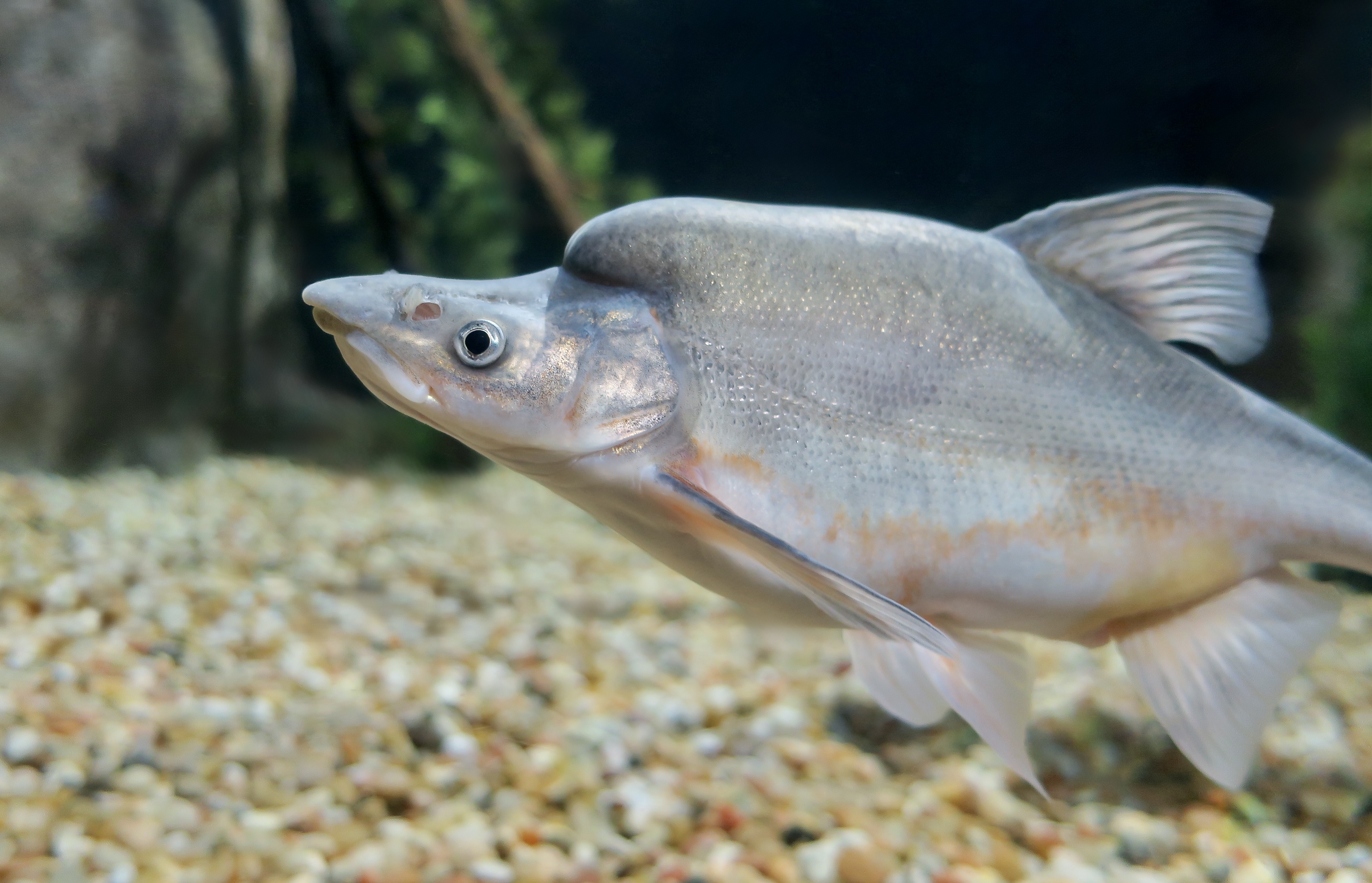
At OdySea Aquarium.

== Description ==
The humpback chub has a streamlined body, with a concave skull on its dorsum. The caudal peduncle is thin and somewhat pencil-like but not greatly elongated, where the length of the caudle peduncle divided by length of head is less than 1.0. The head length divided by the caudal peduncle is less than 5.0. The scales are embedded deeply across the surface of the fish, especially on hump. The fins are large and curved, and the origin of the dorsal are about equidistant between the snout and caudal fin base. The mouth is inferior, and overhung by the snout. The pharyngeal arch is small, with a short lower ramus.

== Range ==
The humpback chub historically ranged from below present-day Hoover Dam in the Colorado River upstream into Colorado, and in the larger portions of Colorado River tributaries in Arizona, Utah, Colorado, and Wyoming. Presently, the species is restricted to six population centers in the Colorado and Little Colorado Rivers in Grand Canyon, Arizona, the Colorado River in Cataract Canyon, Utah, the Colorado River in Black Rocks, Colorado, and Westwater Canyon, Utah, the Green River in Desolation and Gray Canyons, Utah, the Green River in Dinosaur National Monument, Colorado and Utah, and the Yampa River in Dinosaur National Monument, Colorado. The humpback chub is found in Arizona at and around Coconino County, Colorado, and Little Colorado River in the Grand Canyon.

== Habitat ==
In general, species persists only in turbulent, high-gradient, canyon-bound reaches of large rivers in the Colorado River Basin. The young prefer shallow, low-velocity, nearshore pools in the Little Colorado River, and progressively move to deeper, faster areas with increasing size and age. In the Colorado River in Grand Canyon, young-of-year are found in backwater and other near-shore, slow-velocity sites, with similar ontogenetic tendencies. Adults in the Colorado River in Grand Canyon and in the Upper Basin are associated with large eddy complexes. Humpback chub appear to be more active at night.

== Parasites and diseases ==
The population in the Grand Canyon has been previously infested with the parasitic copepod Lernaea cyprinacea, and Asian tapeworm, Bothriocephalus acheilognathi. Kaeding and Zimmermann also reported 13 species of bacteria, six protozoans, and the fungus Saprolegnia to infect humpback chub.

== Population trends ==
The historic range of the humpback chub is uncertain, but the distribution was presumably more contiguous than in the present. Populations were possible in and below the Flaming Gorge that were likely destroyed by the poisoning of the Green River associated with the construction of the Flaming Gorge Reservoir. The fish's distribution within the Grand Canyon has contracted since the construction of Glen Canyon Dam.

For 2008, the total population of the humpback chub in the Grand Canyon was estimated at 6,000 to 10,000. This is a 50% increase over the estimation of 2001 and a reversal of the declining trend between 1989 and 2001. A combination of human causes and natural events seemingly has stabilized the population, particularly the experimental flooding of the canyon and the increase in water temperatures due to drought conditions over the 2000s decade.

== Management and conservation ==
- Threats include altered hydrology and cold tailwater releases from reservoirs, predation by and competition with nonnative fishes, and parasitism.
- Management needs are to ameliorate effects of reservoirs, non-native fish, and parasite sources in chub waters and monitor the status of all populations, including genetic isolation of populations by dams.

The humpback chub's status as an endangered species has prompted elaborate and expensive programs to restore its numbers, largely by modifying the releases from Glen Canyon Dam, creating artificial floods to replicate historic conditions in the Colorado, and removal of non-native predators, such as rainbow trout.

Effective April 20, 1994, seven reaches of the Colorado River System (totaling 379 miles) were designated as critical habitat for Gila cypha. The Grand Canyon Protection Act of 1992 reduced stage fluctuation of water releases from Glen Canyon Dam. Glen Canyon Environmental Studies Phase I (1984–1987) and Phase II (1990–1995) used research data in the development of the Glen Canyon Dam Environmental Impact Statement and Biological Opinion. Upper Colorado River Basin Recovery and Implementation Plan guides recovery efforts for the species in the Upper Basin.

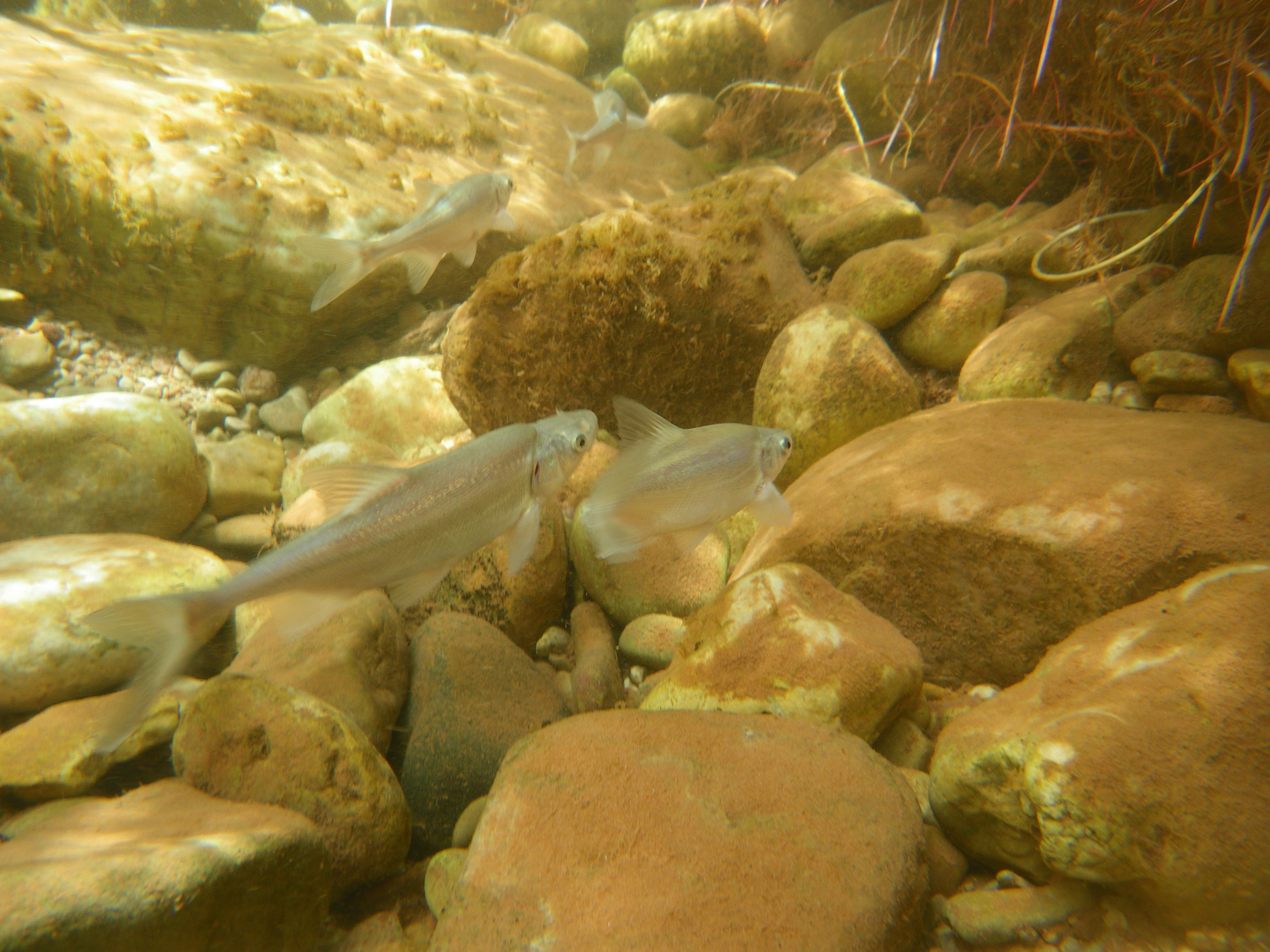
Young humpback chubs after release in Shinumo Creek

After the Colorado had been extensively modified by dams, the Little Colorado River became the fish's stronghold in the Grand Canyon region. A second population was established in Shinumo Creek, another tributary to the Colorado River inside Grand Canyon National Park. The first 300 fish were released in Shinumo Creek in June 2009. Over the following two years, additional young chubs were expected to have been released there.

Federal officials have tried a number of experimental water releases from Glen Canyon Dam in an attempt to replicate historic conditions and restore sandbars, beaches, and backwaters downstream. The first flood began on March 26, 1996, when Interior Secretary Bruce Babbitt stood before a large gathering of media and opened the first of four outlet tubes to begin the imitation inundation. The 1996 flood released nearly 337,000 US gallons (1,280,000 L) per second, enough to fill the Empire State Building or Sears Tower in 20 minutes, drained 117 billion US gallons (440,000,000 m^{3}) from Lake Powell, and dropped the reservoir level by more than 3 ft. Initially, the flood was an apparent success, with sandbars and backwaters created downstream, but as the dam's operations returned to normal, the Colorado ate away at the new habitat and reversed the gains. Several other floods have been tried since 1996, with the releases now timed to coincide with an input of sediment from tributaries, but the results have been disappointing.

The number of humpback chub in the Grand Canyon region has increased significantly, but the reasons are unclear. Removal of non-native fish near the confluence of the Little Colorado River and Colorado River may have helped the species, but at the same time, drought was lowering the level of Lake Powell and causing water released from Glen Canyon Dam to be much warmer than normal. Typically, water released from the dam is too cold for chub to reproduce.

Introduced smallmouth bass have been a predatory threat to humpback chub above the Glen Canyon Dam, but had not been able to get beyond Lake Powell. As of 2022, though, smallmouth bass have been found below Glen Canyon Dam, possibly as a result of the low water level at Colorado River and Lake Powell.

== Baseball team name ==
In 2025, the Grand Junction Jackalopes, a minor league baseball team in Grand Junction, Colorado, announced that they would adopt the name Grand Junction Humpback Chubs for Wednesday home games, in part to draw attention to the need for conservation.
