= Nguni shield =

Traditional cowhide shield used in southeastern Africa

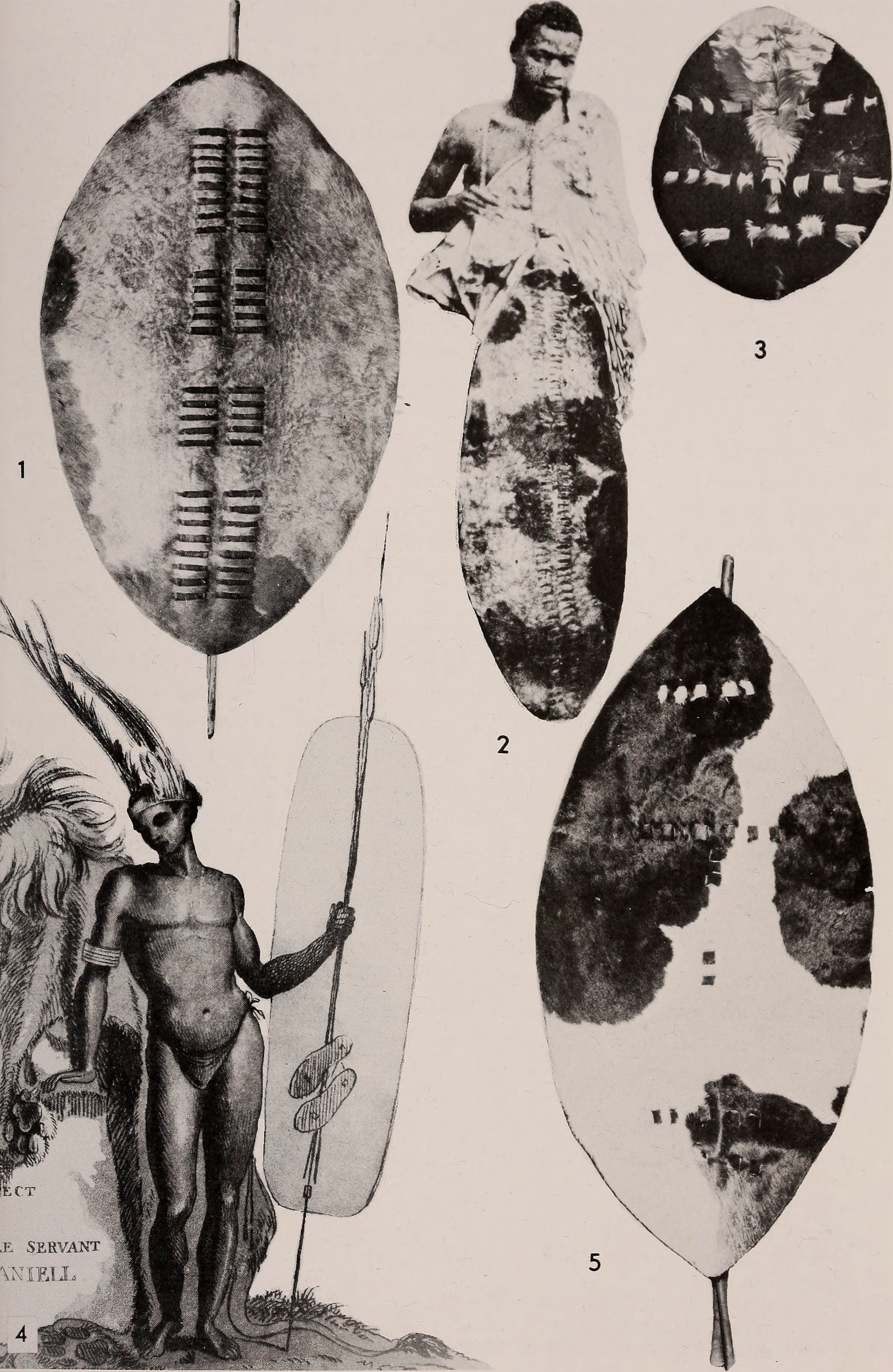
Various shields of the Xhosa: 1. ikhawu with staff 117 cm and hide 95 cm, 1935, Lusikisiki; 2. Retainer of chief, with shield, 1870s, Queenstown; 3. ikhawu of a diviner, 1948, Mount Frere; 4. An early, blunt oval-shaped Xhosa shield, c.1805; 5. ikhawu with staff 127 cm and hide 108 cm, 1948, Mount Frere

A Nguni shield is a traditional, pointed oval-shaped, ox or cowhide shield which is used by various ethnic groups among the Nguni people of southern Africa. Currently it is used by diviners or for ceremonial and symbolic purposes, and many are produced for the tourist market. A cow-hide shield is known as isihlangu, ihawu or ingubha in Zulu, and ikhaka or ikhawu in Xhosa.

Strictly speaking, these native names denote shields of different application, and additional types are known by other names. War shields were traditionally stockpiled by a chief or king, to whom they belonged, while a smaller shield was reserved for his subordinates' personal daily use, or as a complement at their dancing ceremonies.

True Nguni shields are made of raw cattle hide, as the esteemed Sanga-Nguni cattle lend distinction to the shields, which are more than mere commodities for physical protection.

== Varieties ==
Amongst the Zulus, there are various named varieties of these shields, each with a specific use. The large war shield, of about 5 feet (1.5 m) in length, is known as an isihlangu, which means "to brush aside". It was king Shaka's shield of choice, and he intended his warriors to use it in an offensive way by hooking the opponent's shield during hand-to-hand fighting. The umbumbuluzo was also a war shield, but only 3.5 feet (1.1 m) in length, and more sturdy than the isihlangu. They were easily held in one hand, and were used in 1856 during Cetshwayo's campaign against Mbuyazi. The ihubelo is a large shield used for hunting, smaller than isihlangu, but larger than the ihawu. The ihawu is a small to medium-sized shield used at dances. The igqoka is a small, neat shield for courting, and the igabelomunye is the smallest decorative shield, which may be used as an accessory to dancing.

== Traditional use ==
A shield was carried in the left hand, as the only piece of defensive armour used by the Nguni. Its use was practiced from boyhood, by means of stick fighting. Its primary function was to deflect spears, assegais or Khoisan arrows, but they were also carried during lion or leopard hunts. King Shaka's warriors bashed their opponents with the shield to knock them off balance, or alternatively used it to hook the opponents shield away, to enable a stab with the assegai.

Shields could also be used to confuse the enemy; the Zulu army used the shields of their enemies to disguise themselves, and cause bewilderment among enemy ranks. Likewise the vanquished enemy at times took up Zulu shields to hide their identity until they could make their escape. King Dingane's general Bongoza advised his warriors to hide behind shields and imitate grazing cattle, in which way they lured Boer commandos into valleys and into striking distance.

It was used as protection against the weather, or as bivouac shelters when the Xhosa or Fengu armies camped out. When a king was sitting in the open, his subordinates would hold one or several shields over him to shade him from the sun. They were also used during dancing routines, at weddings or as a screen at a bridal procession. During consultation of a diviner they were beaten like drums.

Its use went in decline when firearms were introduced to hostilities. When lions and leopards were exterminated by firearms, it also lost its usefulness in hunting. By 1835 it is said to have been discarded by the Xhosa in their conflicts with Europeans. Baines (1851, 1852) and Weitz (1873) however observed their use among the Mpondo many years later. By the 1870s the Zulus were exporting large quantities of cowhides to obtain firearms and this also decreased the supply.

== Role and deployment in tribal life ==
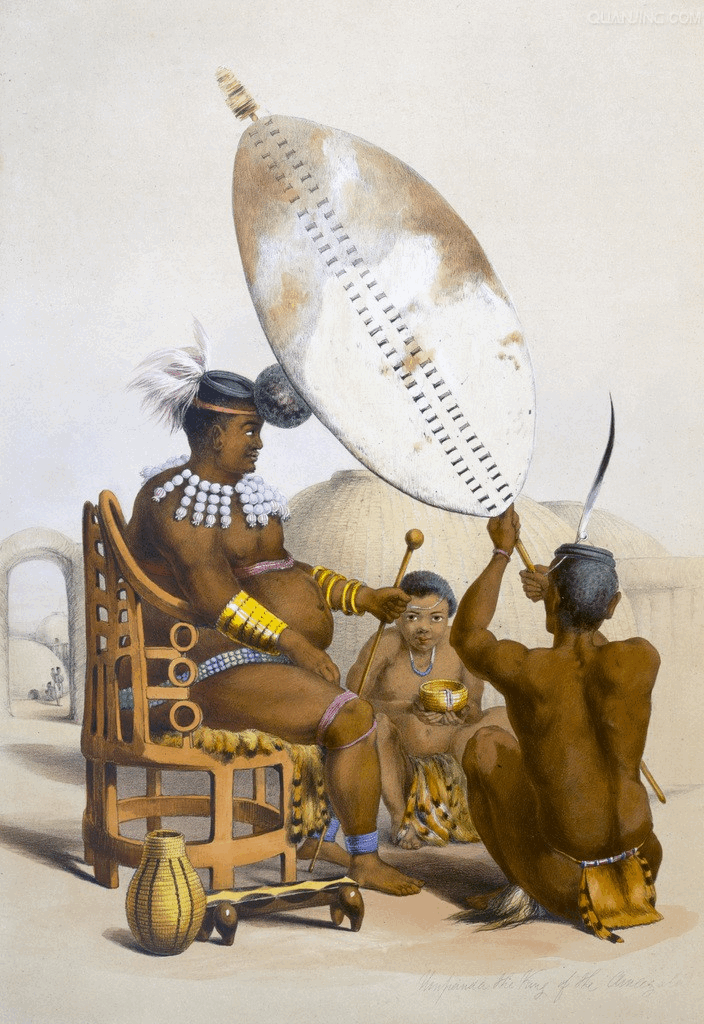
A shield denoted power, law and justice. The shield that shaded a resting king's head was a metaphor for the protection that he and his shield afforded his kingdom. A king could command immediate attention, or start or call off an attack by simply raising his shield.

War shields, unlike assegais, were usually stockpiled by a king or chief, to be distributed in times of need. Besides its defensive role, the shield was a standard or coat of arms of the tribe. Consequently, King Shaka meted out serious punishment to warriors who lost them. A warrior's duty was to return his shield to the king as a matter of honour and patriotism – to leave them in enemy hands or on foreign soil brought ill fame.

The colours of shields were chosen specifically by the Zulu king, and the national cattle herd was selected and bred with these hide preferences in mind. King Shaka favoured hides from cattle in Jobe's country near Mzinyati in Nkandla district. King Mpande's large herd was divided according to colour-pattern and King Cetshwayo kept a large herd of white oxen near oNgoye Forest, the so-called inyonikayipumuli or 'bird that never rests'. This valued herd was confiscated and dispersed when Cetshwayo was deposed.

Tribal belief would have it that the qualities and properties of the valuable and revered inkomo would naturally be transferred to the shield, as like produces like. A shield's believed qualities included the supernatural. A shield treated with intelezi or umuthi medicine for efficacy, was not to fall into enemy hands, as the enemy would in turn be protected by it. A shield that bore the mark of the spear that killed the cattle was most coveted as it was believed to be the most powerful. The shield also played a role in the king's purification ceremony after a battle. It ritually cleansed him from possible defilement through contact with the enemy, and strengthened him.

It was in addition a symbolic object. When a man of note died, his comrades lowered their shields in a display of reverence and tribute. It also acted as insignia of age and veteran status. Regiments of married men, some 18 during Cetshwayo's reign, were entitled to wear a headring and carried white shields, made from hides of the inyonikayipumuli herd. King Mpande's royal Tulwana veterans likewise carried completely white shields, as white and grey suggested wisdom. Warriors of bachelor regiments, some 15 during Cetshwayo's reign, carried black or patterned shields. The black colour suggested youth and strength. Shields with specific patterns were known by names like insane, imitshezi and nkone, and regiments were distinguished this way. The colours also assisted in knowing who was in command during the confusion of fighting.

Young men carried a small decorative igqoka when courting, to enhance their dignity and manliness. In rituals related to Nomkhubulwana ceremonies, young girls in role reversal took over their brothers' task as cowherds. They would briefly carry sticks and shields, herd cattle and take on the authority that a shield would imply.

== Fashioning ==
Shields were fashioned by artisans that were conversant in the colours assigned to the regiments. Their production by specialists was perhaps a later trend, as Alberti (1810) noted that every Xhosa man of military age had to make his own, to be handed to the chief for safekeeping in a special hut. Sometimes a hide was treated and buried for a few days. Otherwise it was just pegged out in the sun to dry. Then a rounded stone was used to pound it into a hollow shape, which also toughened it, before it was cut to shape. A war shield required most of an ox-hide, and ornamental shields or other raw hide commodities could be made from the leavings.

A double row of contrasting marks down the center of the shield, known as imigabelo (singular: umgabelo), are both ornamental and a convenient way of fastening the handle. They are crafted by passing contrastingly coloured strips of hide through a double row of slits, which are cut while the hide is still wet and pliant. Thong loops tie the strips and the shield's handle to a stout removable staff, known as the mgobo, which runs down the center of the shield. It is long enough to project at both ends, and strengthens the shield and prevents it from bending. It also assists the warrior or dancer to swing it about rapidly. The shield can be rested on the lower projection of the staff when a warrior is tired. The lower projection could also be sharpened to stab at the legs of an enemy combatant. The shield should be tall enough that the warrior can just glance over its top. The top of the stick reaches the crown of the warrior's head, and is decorated by strips of furry skin which are wound around it. The Mpondos used black ostrich feathers instead.

== Gallery ==
A Nguni shield features prominently on the Flag of Eswatini

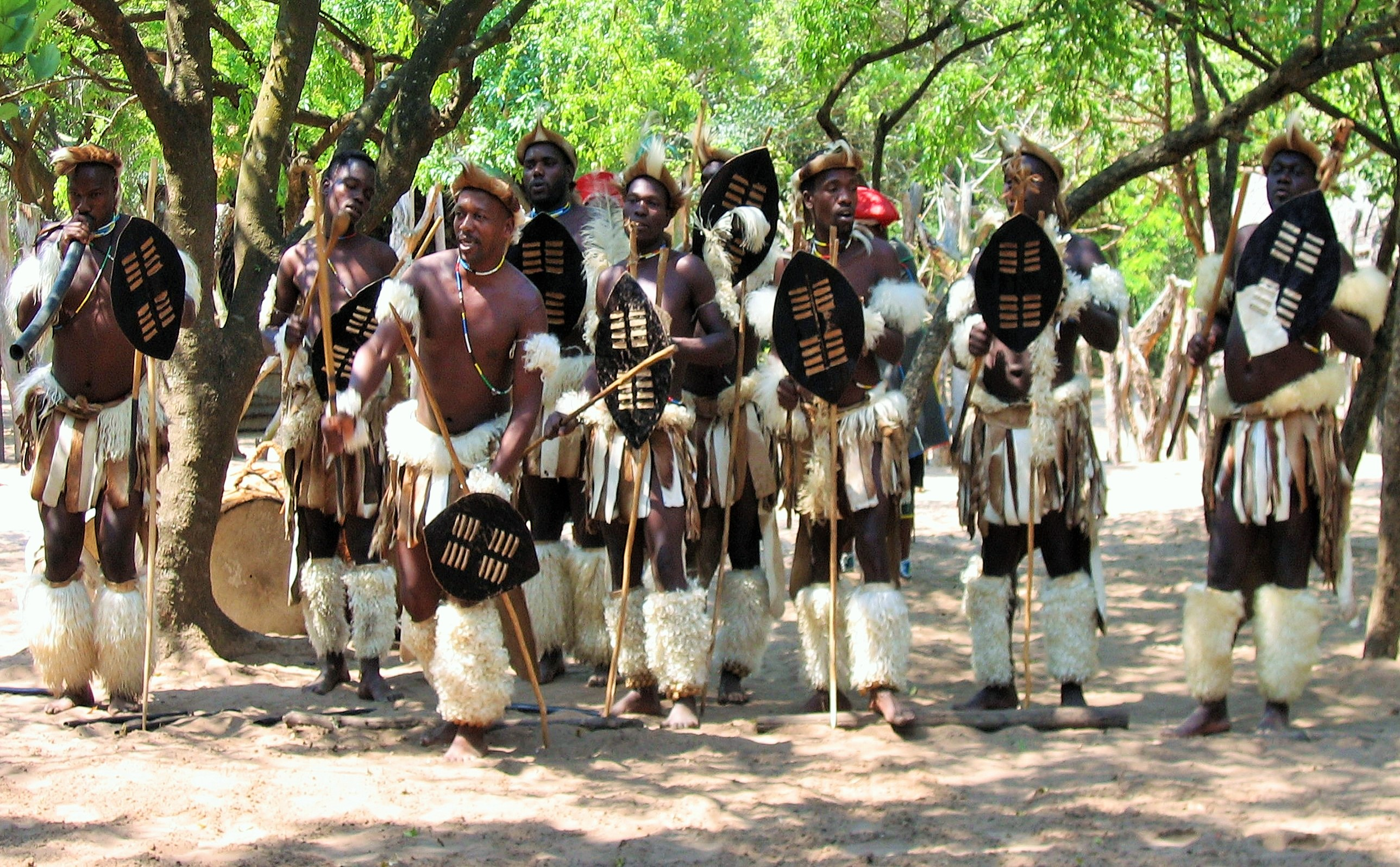
Swazi dancers with amahawu (singular: ihawu), or personal shields

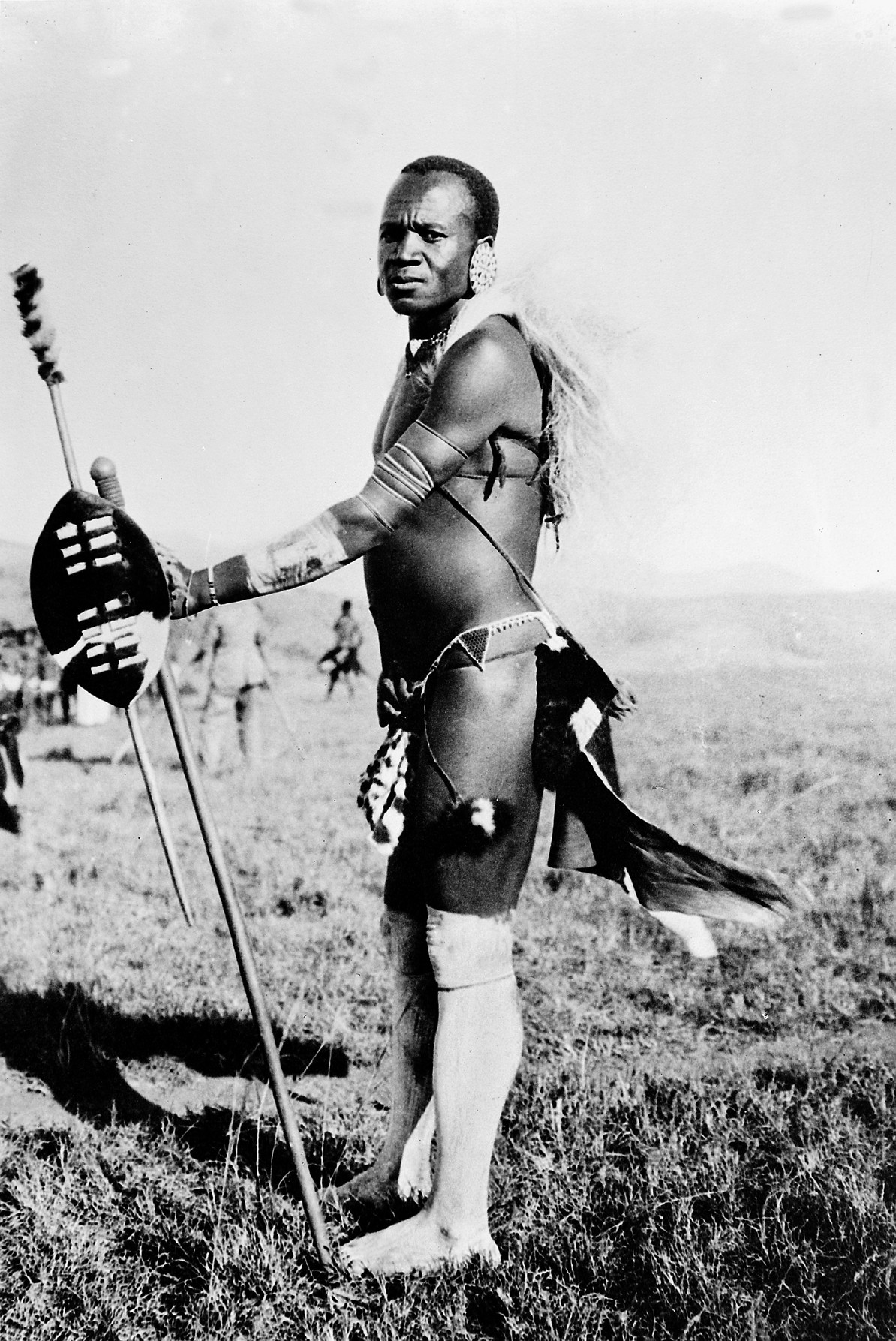
Zulu man with an igqoka, used during courting

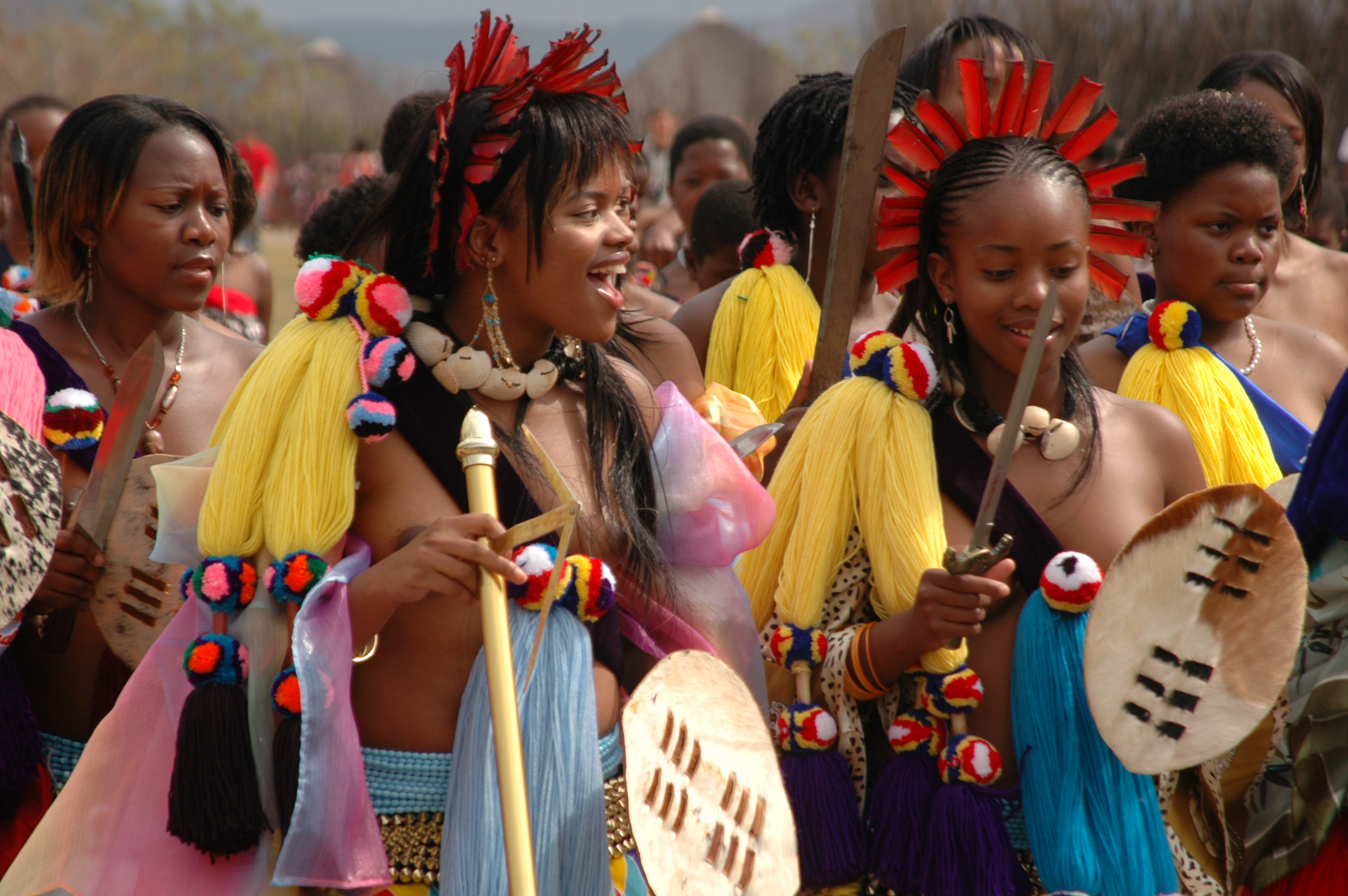
Swazi royals with small, ornamental shields, i.a. associated with Nomkhubulwana ceremonies

== See also ==
- Nguni cattle
