= Nguni cattle =

African breed of cattle

Nguni
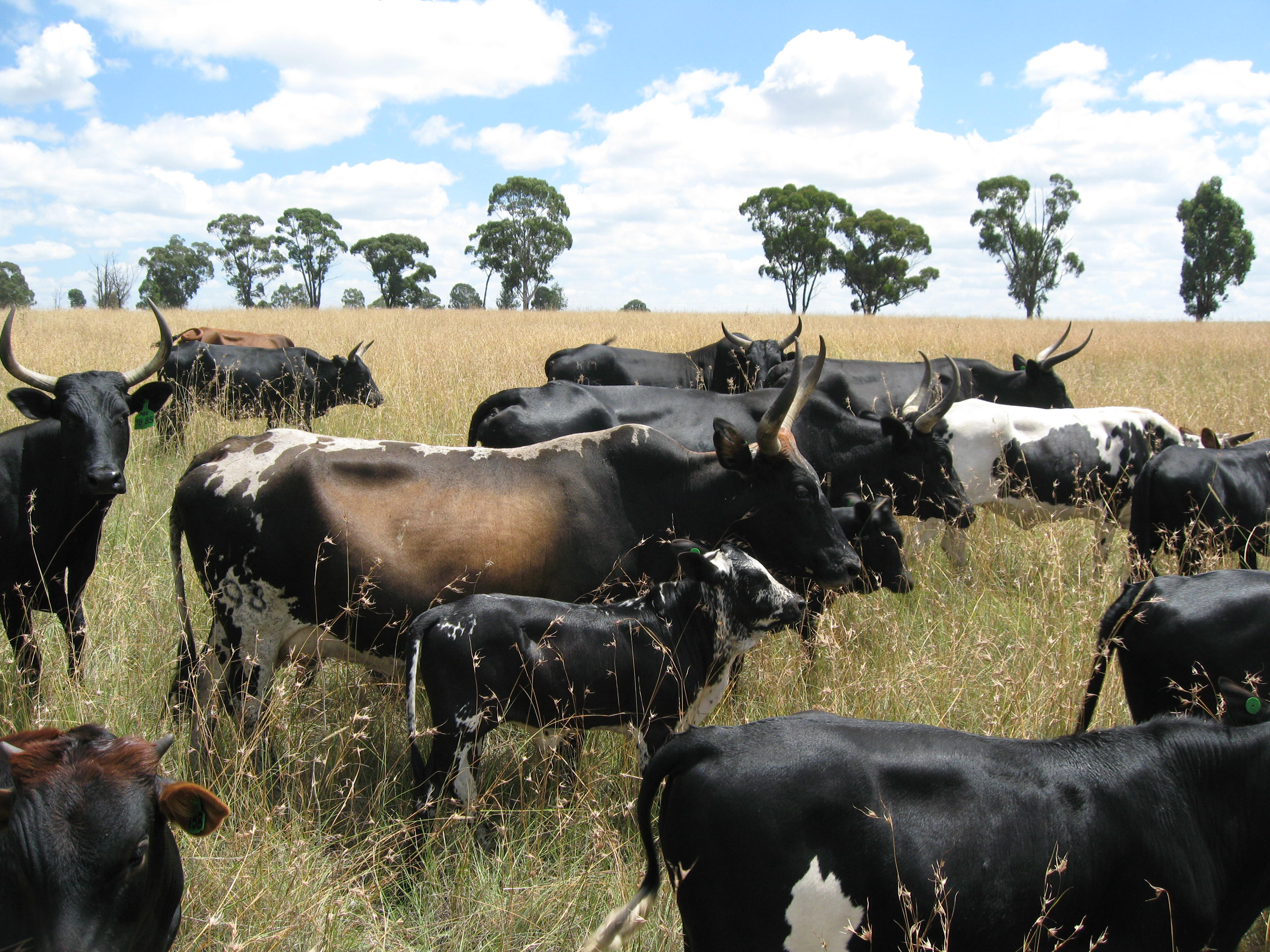
- A herd of the Makhathini ecotype

The Nguni is a cattle breed indigenous to Southern Africa. A hybrid of different Indian and later European cattle breeds, they were introduced by pastoralist tribes ancestral to modern Nguni people to Southern Africa during their migration from the North of the continent.

The cattle are medium-sized and adapted to grazing on the highveld.

== Characteristics ==
The Nguni is fertile and resistant to diseases, being the favourite and most beloved breed amongst the local Bantu-speaking people of southern Africa (South Africa, Eswatini, Namibia, Zimbabwe, Botswana, and Angola). It is characterised by a multi-coloured coat, which can present many different patterns; the nose is always black-tipped.

It is a principal form of Sanga cattle, which originated as hybrids of Zebu and humpless cattle in East Africa. DNA analyses have confirmed that it is a combination of Bos indicus and Bos taurus, that is a combination of different Zebu and European cattle breeds.

They are characterised by low cervicothoracic humps, in front of the front legs, instead of the high thoracic humps of pure Zebu. Besides the various colour patterns, these animals present a variety of horn shapes.

All different combinations were catalogued in the beginning of the century by a South African herdmaster. This work inspired the Nguni Cattle Register, a compilation of terms to describe in full a Nguni cow or bull. The cattle are medium-sized, with bulls weighing between 500 and 600 kg, while cows weigh between 300 and 400 kg.

== Origins ==
It is generally assumed the ancestors of Nguni cattle were brought by ancestors of Nguni people (Zulu, Xhosa, Ndebele, Swazi people, etc.), during their migration to the south of Africa.

== See also ==
- Nguni languages
- Nguni shield
- Cowhide
