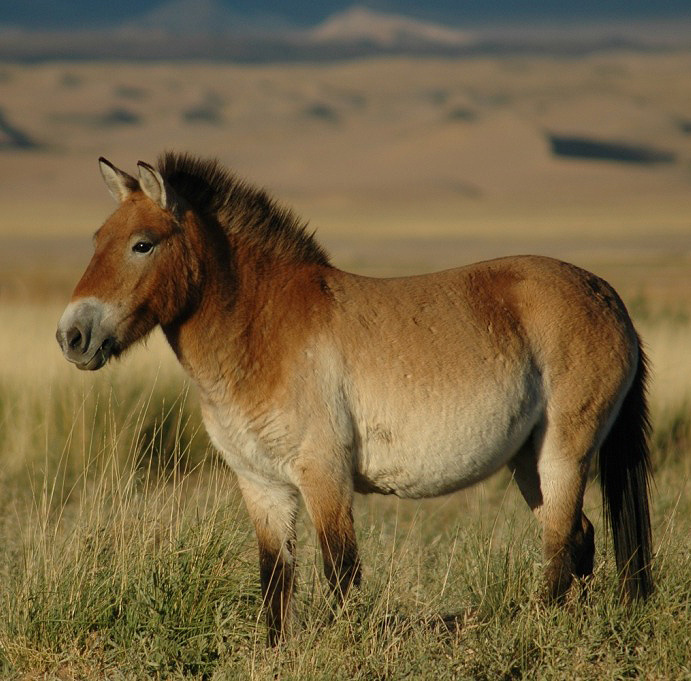

Conservation status
- Endangered (IUCN 3.1)
- CITES Appendix I

Scientific classification
- Kingdom: Animalia
- Phylum: Chordata
- Class: Mammalia
- Order: Perissodactyla
- Family: Equidae
- Genus: Equus
- Species: E. ferus
- Subspecies: E. f. przewalskii

Trinomial name
- Equus ferus przewalskii (I. S. Polyakov, 1881)
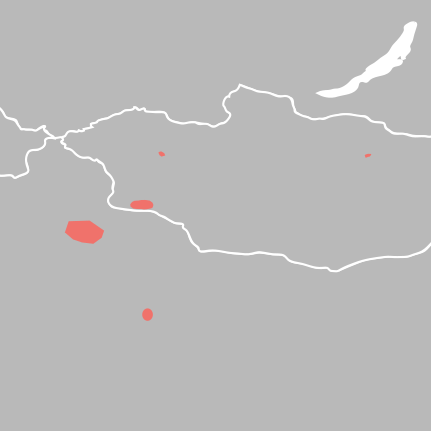
- Przewalski's horse range (IUCN distribution of Przewalski's horse, where it is extant & reintroduced to 5 disjointed areas in Northern China and Southern Mongolia; missing distribution in Russia, Belarus, and Ukraine)

Synonyms
- Species Level: Equus przewalskii Polyakov, 1881; Subspecies Level: E. f. hagenbecki Matschie, 1903; E. f. prjevalskii Ewart, 1903; E. f. typicus Max Hilzheimer, 1909

= Przewalski's horse =

Subspecies of mammal

Przewalski's horse (Note: British English: /ˌpɜːrʒəˈvælski/ PUR-zhə-VAL-skee, American English: /-ˈvɑːl-/ -VAHL-, Polish: [pʂɛˈvalskʲi], Russian: [prʐɨˈvalʲskʲɪj] (Пржевальский).) (Equus ferus przewalskii or Equus przewalskii), also called the takhi, (Note: Mongolian: Тахь.) Mongolian wild horse or Dzungarian horse, is a rare and endangered wild horse originally native to the steppes of Central Asia. It is named after Russian geographer and explorer Nikolay Przhevalsky. Once extinct in the wild, since the 1990s it has been reintroduced to its native habitat in Mongolia in the Hustai National Park, Takhin Tal Nature Reserve, Khomiin Tal, and several other locales in Central Asia and Eastern Europe.

Several genetic characteristics of Przewalski's horse differ from those seen in modern domesticated horses, indicating neither is an ancestor of the other. For example, Przewalski's horse has 33 chromosome pairs compared with 32 for the domesticated horse. Their ancestral lineages split from a common ancestor between 160,000 and 38,000 years ago, long before the domestication of the horse. Przewalski's horse was long considered the only remaining truly wild horse, in contrast with the American mustang and the Australian brumby, which are feral horses descended from domesticated animals. That status was called into question when domesticated horses of the 5,000-year-old Botai culture of Central Asia were found to be more closely related to Przewalski's horses than to E. f. caballus. The study raised the possibility that modern Przewalski's horses could be the feral descendants of the domestic Botai horses. However, it remains possible that both the Botai horses and modern Przewalski's horses descend separately from the same ancient wild Przewalski's horse population. Its taxonomic position is still debated, with some taxonomists treating Przewalski's horse as a species, E. przewalskii, others as a subspecies of wild horse (E. ferus przewalskii) or a variety of the domesticated horse (E. ferus caballus).

Przewalski's horse is stockily built, smaller, and shorter than its domesticated relatives. Typical height is about 12–14 hands (48–56 inches, 122–142 cm), and the average weight is around 300 kg (660 lb). They have a dun coat with pangaré features and often have dark primitive markings.

== Taxonomy ==
Przewalski's horse was formally described as a novel species in 1881 by Ivan Semyonovich Polyakov. The taxonomic position of Przewalski's horse remains controversial, and no consensus exists about whether it is a full species (as Equus przewalskii); a subspecies of Equus ferus, the wild horse, (as Equus ferus przewalskii in trinomial nomenclature, along with two other subspecies, the domestic horse E. f. caballus, and the extinct tarpan E. f. ferus); or even a subpopulation of the domesticated horse. The American Society of Mammalogists considers both Przewalski's horse and the tarpan to be subspecies of Equus ferus and classifies the domesticated horse as a separate species, Equus caballus.

== Lineage ==
Genetic analysis shows that the takhi and the domesticated horse differ significantly, with neither ancestral to the other. The evolutionary divergence of the two populations was estimated to have occurred about 72,000–38,000 years ago, well before domestication, most likely due to climate, topography, or other environmental changes.

According to a 2009 study, the earliest known domesticated horses were found at settlements of the Botai culture, from about 5500 years ago. These horses were raised for meat and milk. In 2018, a new study indicated that the ancient horses of the Botai culture are related to takhis, not to domesticated horses as was previously thought. Specifically, the Botai horses appeared to be ancestral to the modern takhi, because all seven takhis nested within the phylogenetic tree of the 20 Botai horses. No comparison was made to definitively wild early takhis. The authors posit that modern Przewalski's horses are feral descendants of the ancient Botai domesticated animals rather than representing a surviving population of never-domesticated horses. Another geneticist pointed out that Przewalski's horses may have simply descended from the same wild population that the Botai horses came from, which would still be compatible with the findings of the study.

In 2021, William Taylor and Christina Barron-Ortiz disputed the evidence for domestication of Przewalski's horse. Their case was rejected by Alan Outram and colleagues in a paper which was not dated or peer-reviewed. Taylor reiterated his arguments that Przewalski's horse had never been domesticated in an article in Scientific American in 2024.

In any case, the Botai horses were found to have negligible genetic contribution to any of the ancient or modern domestic horses studied, indicating that the domestication of the latter was independent, involving a different wild population, from any possible domestication of Przewalski's horse by the Botai culture.

== Characteristics ==
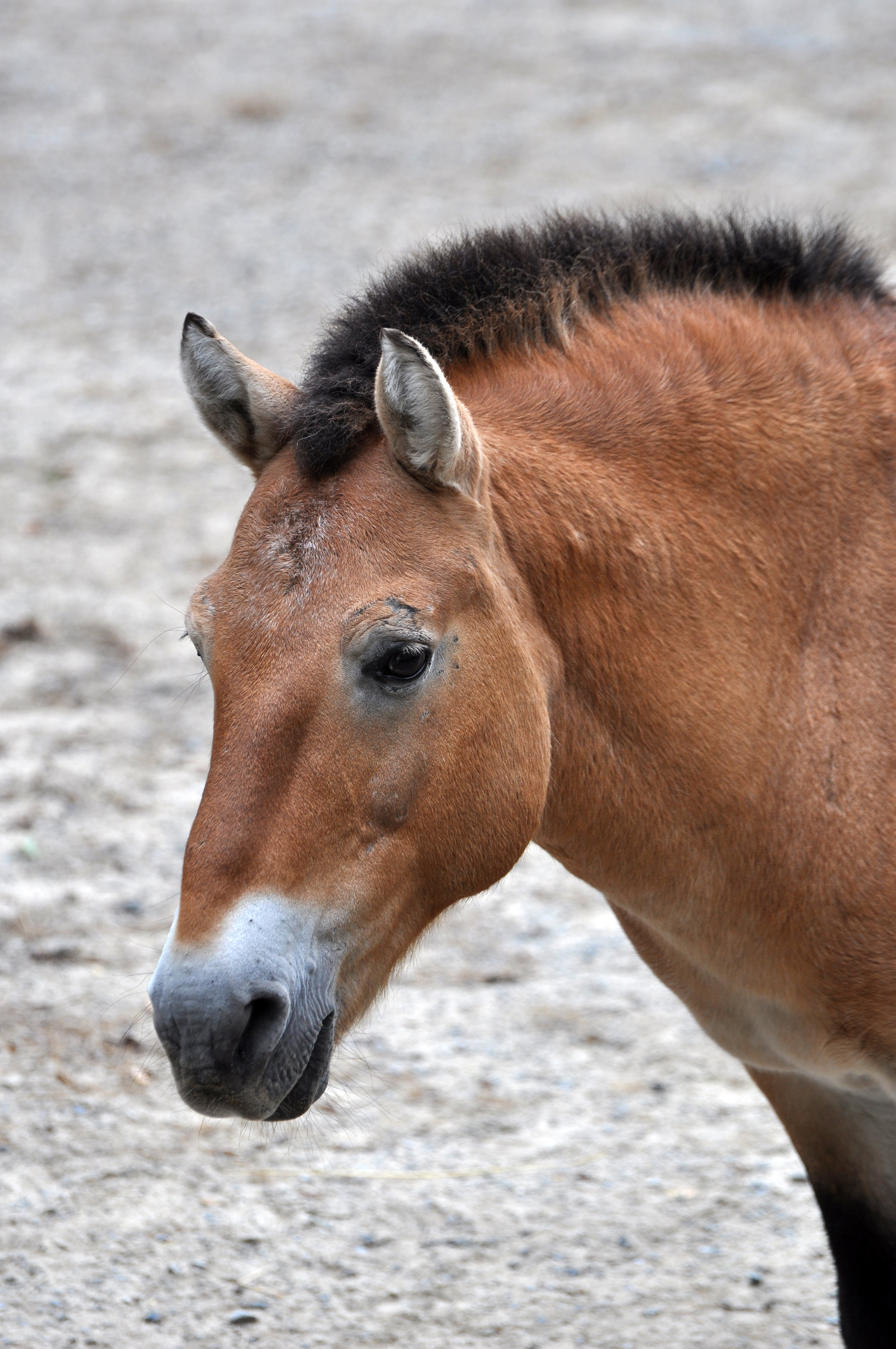
Head shot, showing convex profile

Przewalski's horse is stockily built in comparison to domesticated horses, with shorter legs, and is much smaller and shorter than its domesticated relatives. Typical height is about 12–14 hands (48–56 inches, 122–142 cm), and length is about 2.1 m (6 ft 11 in). It weighs around 300 kilograms (660 lb). The coat is generally dun in color with pangaré features, varying from dark brown around the mane, to pale brown on the flanks, and yellowish-white on the belly, as well as around the muzzle. The legs of Przewalski's horse are often faintly striped, also typical of primitive markings. The mane stands erect and does not extend as far forward, whilst the tail is about 90 cm (35 in) long, with a longer dock and shorter hair than seen in domesticated horses. The hooves of Przewalski's horse are longer in the front and have significantly thicker sole horns than feral horses, an adaptation that improves hoof performance on terrain.

=== Genomics ===
The karyotype of Przewalski's horse differs from that of the domestic horse, having 33 chromosome pairs versus 32, apparently due to a fission of a large chromosome ancestral to domestic horse chromosome 5 to produce Przewalski's horse chromosomes 23 and 24, though conversely, a Robertsonian translocation that fused two chromosomes ancestral to those seen in Przewalski's horse to produce the single large domestic horse chromosome has also been proposed.

Many smaller inversions, insertions and other rearrangements were observed between the chromosomes of domestic and Przewalski's horses, while there was much lower heterozygosity in Przewalski's horses, with extensive segments devoid of genetic diversity, a consequence of the recent severe bottleneck of the captive Przewalski's horse population. In comparison, the chromosomal differences between domestic horses and zebras include numerous large-scale translocations, fusions, inversions, and centromere repositioning. Przewalski's horse has the highest diploid chromosome number among all equine species. They can interbreed with the domesticated horse and produce fertile offspring.

The mitochondrial genome has 37 genes, which are 99.63% identical to those of the domestic horse.

== Ecology and behavior ==
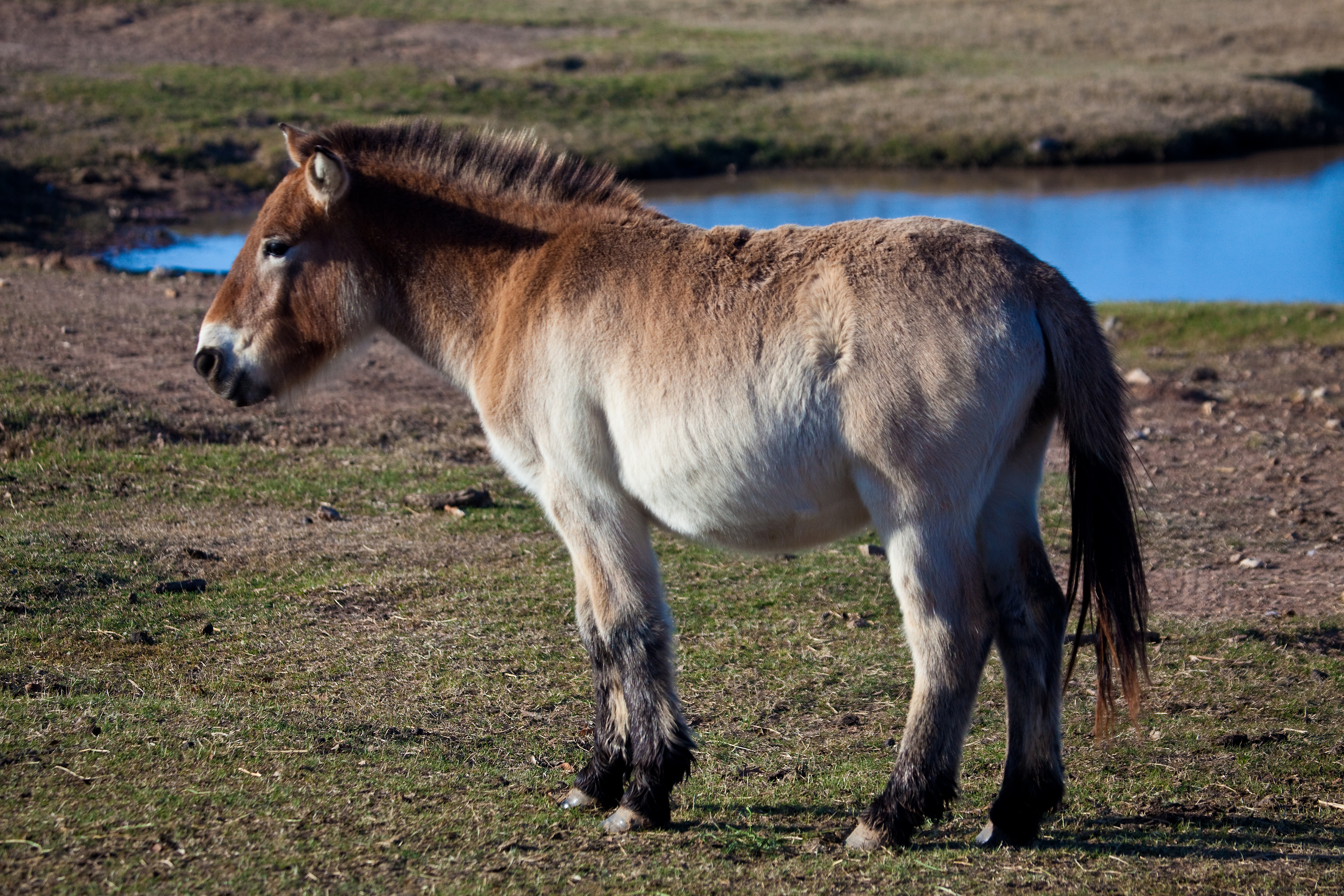
Winter coat

Przewalski reported the horses forming troops of between five and fifteen members, consisting of a mature stallion, his mares and foals. Modern reintroduced populations similarly form family groups of one adult stallion, one to three mares, and their common offspring that stay in the family group until they are no longer dependent, usually at two or three years old. Young females join other harems, while bachelor stallions as well as old stallions who have lost their harems join bachelor groups. Family groups can join to form a herd that moves together.

The patterns of their daily lives exhibit horse behavior similar to that of feral horse herds. Stallions herd, drive, and defend all members of their family, while the mares often display leadership in the family. Stallions and mares stay with their preferred partners for years. While behavioral synchronization is high among mares, stallions other than the main harem stallion are generally less stable in this respect.

Home range in the wild is little studied, but estimated as 1.2–24 km^{2} (0.46–9.3 sq mi) in the Hustai National Park and 150–825 km^{2} (58–319 sq mi) in the Great Gobi B Strictly Protected Area. The ranges of harems are separated, but slightly overlapping. They have few modern predators, but one of the few is the Himalayan wolf.

Horses maintain visual contact with their family and herd at all times, and have a host of ways to communicate with one another, including vocalizations, scent marking, and a wide range of visual and tactile signals. Each kick, groom, tilt of the ear, or other contact with another horse is a means of communicating. This constant communication leads to complex social behaviors among Przewalski's horses.

The historical population was said to have lived in the "wildest parts of the desert" with a preference for "especially saline districts". They were observed mostly during spring and summer at natural wells, migrating to them by crossing valleys rather than by way of higher mountains.

=== Diet ===
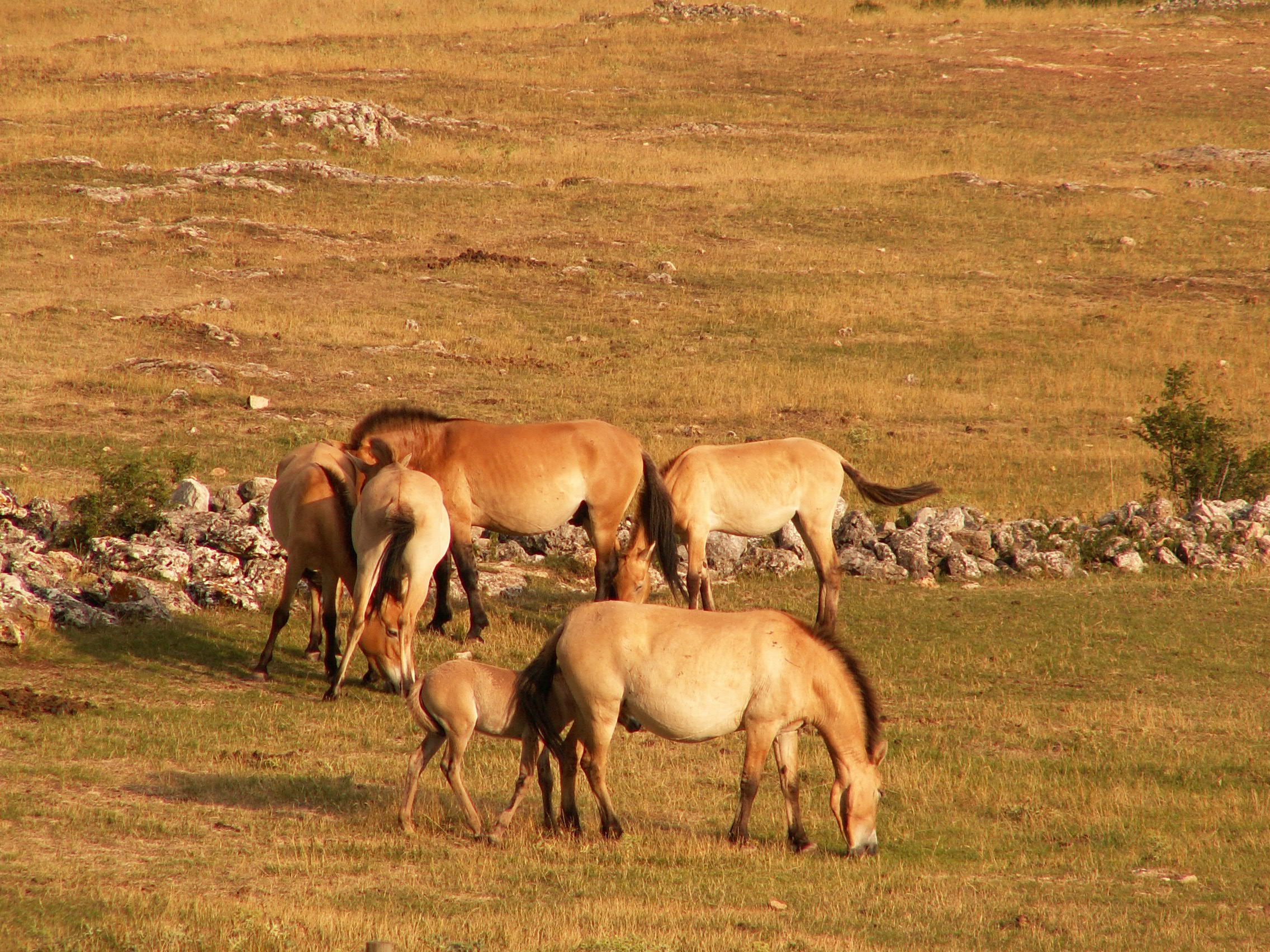
Przewalski's horses

Przewalski horse's diet consists of vegetation. In the Chernobyl exclusion zone, Przewalski's horses consume primarily grasses and forbs, including Elymus repens, Carex spp., Fabaceae, and Asteraceae. Looking at the species' diet overall, Przewalski's horses most often eat E. repens, Trifolium pratense, Vicia cracca, Poa trivialis, Dactylis glomerata, and Bromus inermis. While the horses eat a variety of different plant species, they tend to favor different species at different times of year. In the springtime, they favor Elymus repens, Corynephorus canescens, Festuca valesiaca, and Chenopodium album. In early summer, they favor Dactylis glomerata and Trifolium, and in late summer, they gravitate towards E. repens and Vicia cracca.

In winter the horses eat Salix spp., Pyrus communis, Malus sylvatica, Pinus sylvestris, Rosa spp., and Alnus spp. Additionally, Przewalski's horses may dig for Festuca spp., Bromus inermis, and E. repens that grow beneath the ice and snow. Their winter diet is very similar to the winter diet of domestic horses, but differs from that revealed by isotope analysis of the historical (pre-captivity) population, which switched in winter to browsing shrubs, though the difference may be due to the extreme habitat pressure the historical population was under. In the wintertime, they eat their food more slowly than they do during other times of the year. Przewalski's horses seasonally display a set of changes collectively characteristic of physiologic adaptation to starvation, with their basal metabolic rate in winter being half what it is during springtime. This is not a direct consequence of decreased nutrient intake, but rather a programmed response to predictable seasonal dietary fluctuation.

=== Reproduction ===
Mating occurs in late spring or early summer. Mating stallions do not start looking for mating partners until the age of five. Stallions assemble groups of mares or challenge the leader of another group for dominance. Females are able to give birth at the age of three and have a gestation period of 11–12 months. Foals are able to stand about an hour after birth. The rate of infant mortality among foals is 25%, with 83.3% of these deaths resulting from leading stallion infanticide. Foals begin grazing within a few weeks but are not weaned for 8–13 months after birth. They reach sexual maturity at two years of age.

== Population ==
=== History ===
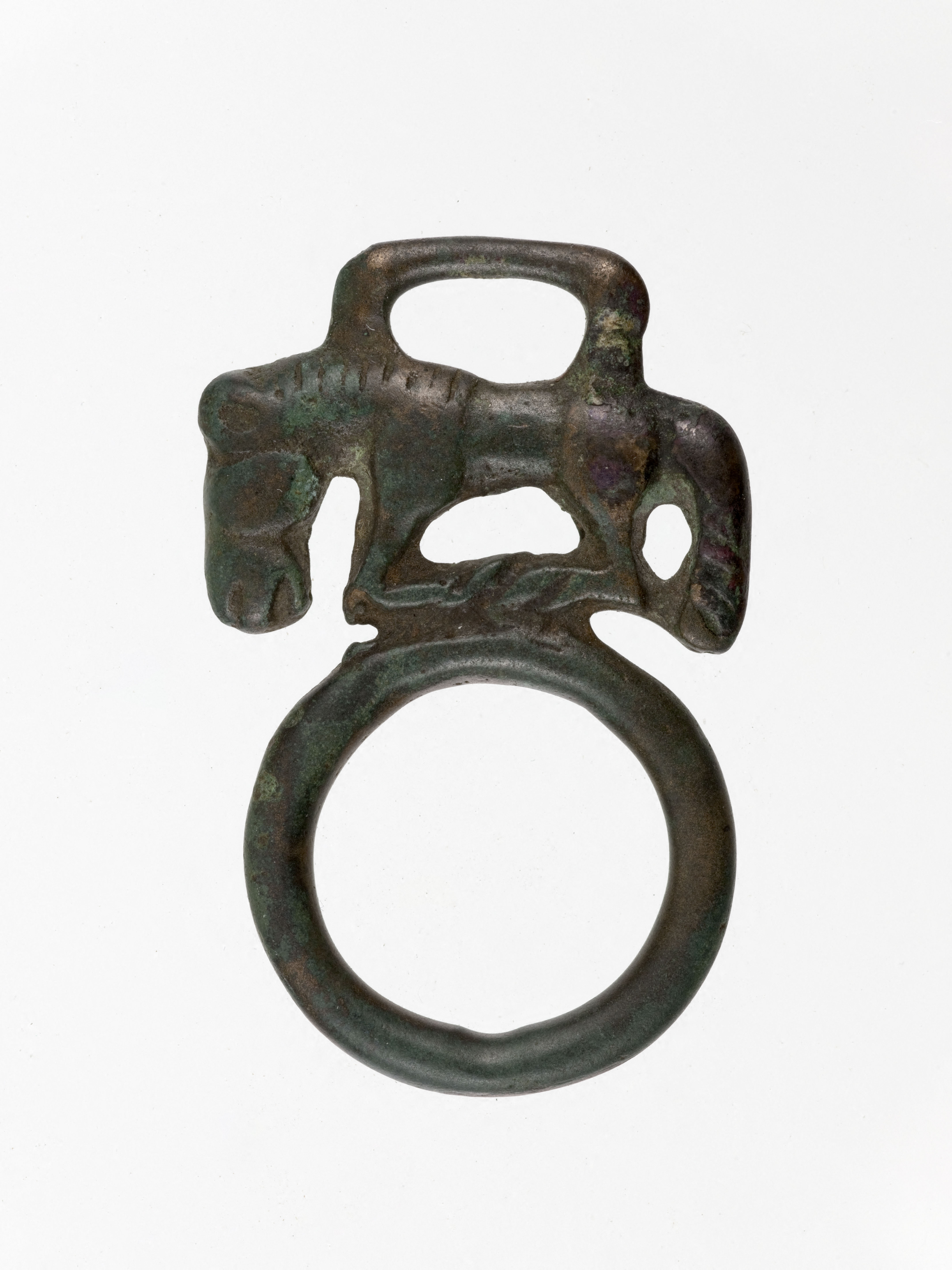
Przewalski's horse on bronze ring made in Northern Hebei and Western Liaoning. 6th-5th century BCE. Musée Cernuschi

Przewalski's-type wild horses appear in European cave art dating as far back as 20,000 years ago, but genetic investigation of a 35,870-year-old specimen from one such cave instead showed an affinity with extinct Iberian horse lineage and the modern domestic horse, suggesting that it was not Przewalski's horse being depicted in this art. Horse skeletons dating to the fifth to the third millennia BCE, found in Central Asia, with a range extending to the southern Urals and the Altai, belong to the genetic lineage of Przewalski's horse. Of particular note are the horses of this lineage found in the archaeological sites of the Chalcolithic Botai culture. Sites dating from the mid-fourth-millennium BCE show evidence of horse domestication. Analysis of ancient DNA from Botai horse specimens from about 3000 BCE reveals them to have DNA markers consistent with the lineage of modern Przewalski's horses.

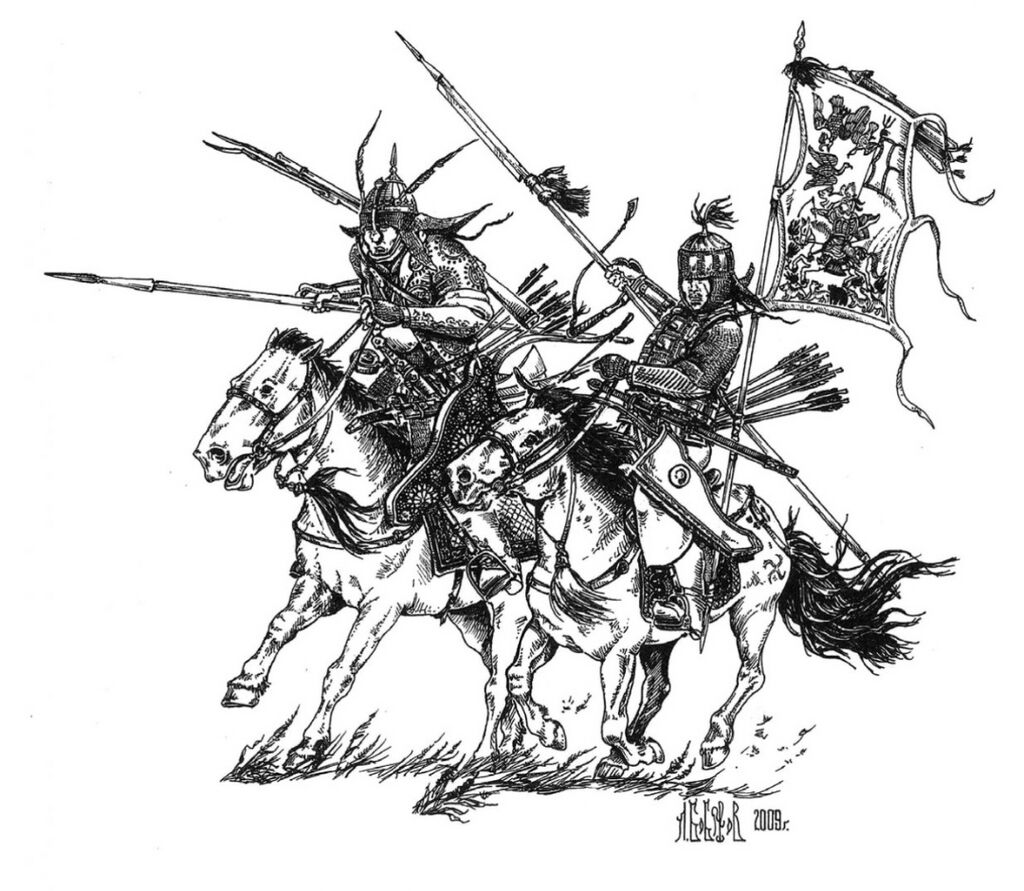
Dzungar soldiers riding Przewalski horses.

There are sporadic reports of Przewalski's horse in the historical record before its formal characterization. The Buddhist monk Bodowa wrote a description of what is thought to have been Przewalski's horse about AD 900, and an account from 1226 reports an incident involving wild horses during Genghis Khan's campaign against the Tangut empire. In the fifteenth century, Johann Schiltberger recorded one of the first European sightings of the horses in the journal recounting his trip to Mongolia as a prisoner of the Mongol Khan. Another was recorded as a gift to the Qing emperor around 1630, its value as a gift suggesting a difficulty in obtaining them. John Bell, a Scottish doctor in service to Peter the Great from 1719 to 1722, observed a horse in Russia's Tomsk Oblast that was apparently this species, and a few decades later in 1750, a large hunt with thousands of beaters organized by the Qing emperor, Qianlong killed between two and three hundred of these horses.

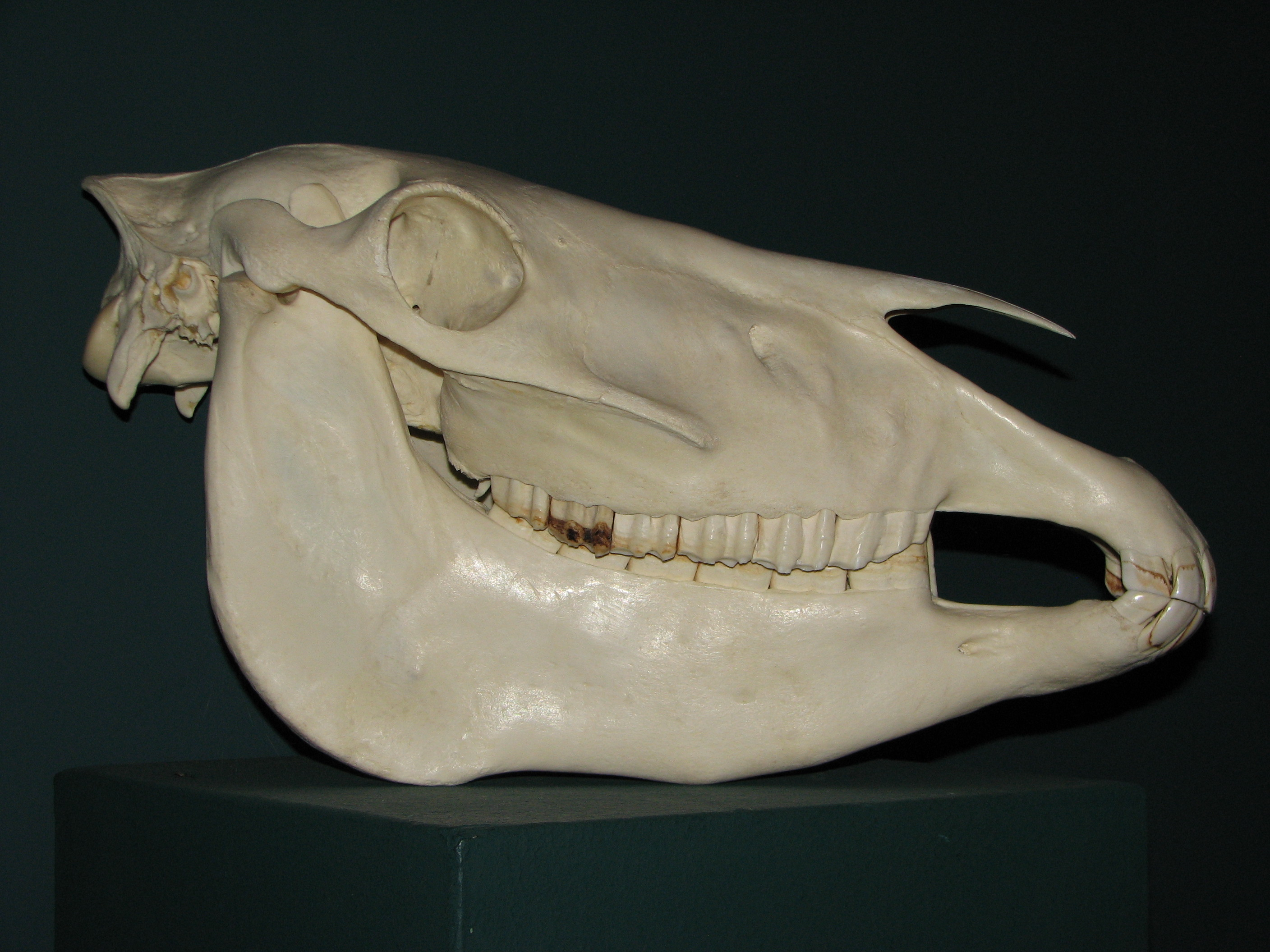
Przewalski's horse skull, Brno museum

The species is named after a Russian colonel of Polish descent, Nikolai Przhevalsky (1839–1888) (Nikołaj Przewalski in Polish). An explorer and naturalist, he obtained the skull and hide of an animal shot in 1878 in the Gobi near today's China–Mongolia border. He would travel to the Dzungarian Basin to observe it in the wild. In 1881, the horse received a formal scientific description and was named Equus przevalskii by Ivan Semyonovich Polyakov, based on Przewalski's collection and description, while in 1884, the sole exemplar of the horse in Europe was a preserved specimen in the Museum of the Russian Academy of Sciences in St. Petersburg. This was supplemented in 1894 when the brothers Grum-Grzhimailo returned several hides and skulls to St. Petersburg and described the horse's behavior in the wild. A number of these horses were captured around 1900 by Carl Hagenbeck and placed in zoos, and these, along with one later captive, reproduced to give rise to today's population.

After 1903, there were no reports of the wild population until 1947, when several isolated groups were observed and a lone filly captured. Although local herdsmen reported seeing as many as 50 to 100 takhis grazing in small groups then, there were only sporadic sightings of single groups of two or three animals after that, mostly near natural wells. Two scientific expeditions in 1955 and 1962 failed to find any. After herders and naturalists reported single harem groups in 1966 and 1967, the last observation of the wild horse in its native habitat was of a single stallion in 1969. Expeditions after this failed to locate any horses, and the species would be designated "extinct in the wild" for over 30 years. Competition with livestock, hunting, capture of foals for zoological collections, military activities, and harsh winters recorded in 1945, 1948, and 1956 are considered to be main causes of the decline in Przewalski's horse population.

The wild population was already rare at its first scientific characterization. Przewalski reported seeing them only from a distance and may have instead sighted herds of local onager Mongolian wild asses. He was able to obtain specimens of the type only from Kirghiz hunters. The range of Przewalski's horse was limited to the arid Dzungarian Basin in the Gobi Desert. It has been suggested that this was not their natural habitat, but, like the onager, they were a steppe animal driven to this barren last refuge by the dual pressures of hunting and habitat loss to agricultural grazing. There were two distinct populations recognized by local Mongolians, a lighter steppe variety and a darker mountain one. This distinction is seen in early twentieth-century descriptions. Their mountainous habitat included the Takhiin Shar Nuruu (The Yellow Wild-Horse Mountain Range). In their last decades in the wild, the remnant population was limited to the small region between the Takhiin Shar Nuruu and Bajtag-Bogdo mountain ridges.

=== Captivity ===
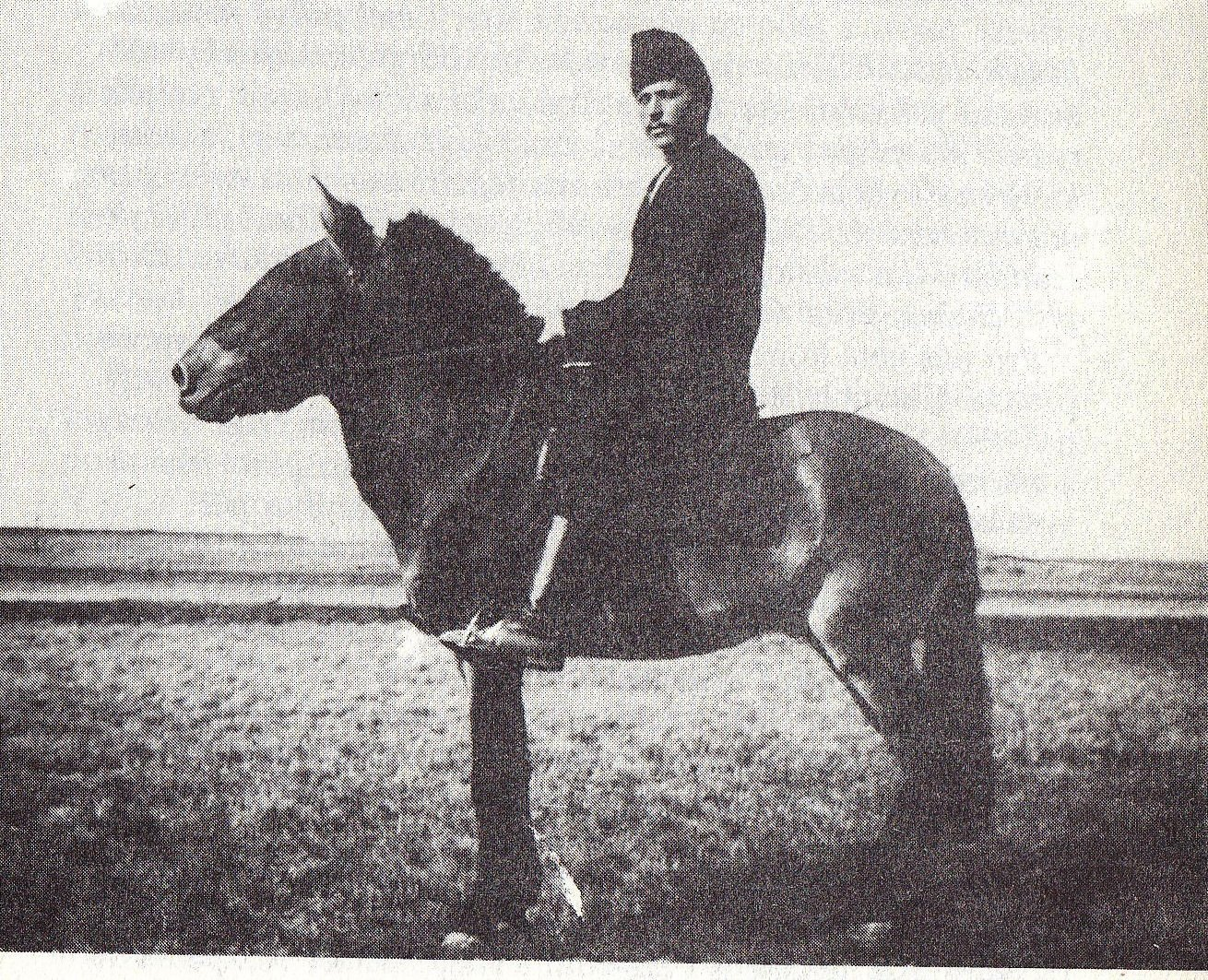
Vaska, a Przewalski horse trained to be ridden

Attempts to obtain specimens for exhibit and captive breeding were largely unsuccessful until 1902, when 28 captured foals were brought to Europe. These and a small number of additional captives would be distributed among zoos and breeding centers in Europe and the United States. Many facilities failed in their attempts at captive breeding, but a few programs were established. However, by the mid-1930s, inbreeding had caused reduced fertility, and the captive population experienced a genetic bottleneck, with the surviving captive breeding stock descended from only 11 of the founder captives. In addition, in at least one instance, the progeny of interbreeding with a domestic horse was bred back into the captive Przewalski's horse population. However, recent studies have shown only minimal genetic contribution of this domestic horse to the captive population.

The situation was improved when the exchange of breeding animals among facilities increased genetic diversity and there was a consequent improvement in fertility, but the population experienced another genetic bottleneck when many of the horses failed to survive World War II. The most valuable group, in Askania Nova, Ukraine, was shot by German soldiers during World War II occupation, and the group in the United States had died out. Only two captive populations in zoos remained, in Munich and in Prague, and of the 31 remaining horses at war's end, only nine became ancestors of the subsequent captive population. By the end of the 1950s, only 12 individual horses were left in the world's zoos.

A wild-caught mare captured as a foal a decade earlier was introduced into the Ukrainian captive population in 1957. This would prove the last wild-caught horse, and with the presumed extinction of the wild population, last sighted in Mongolia in the late 1960s, the captive population became the sole representatives of Przewalski's horse. Genetic diversity received a much-needed boost from this new source, with the spread of her bloodline through the inbred captive groups leading to their increased reproductive success, and by 1965, there were more than 130 animals spread among 32 zoos and parks.

=== Conservation efforts ===
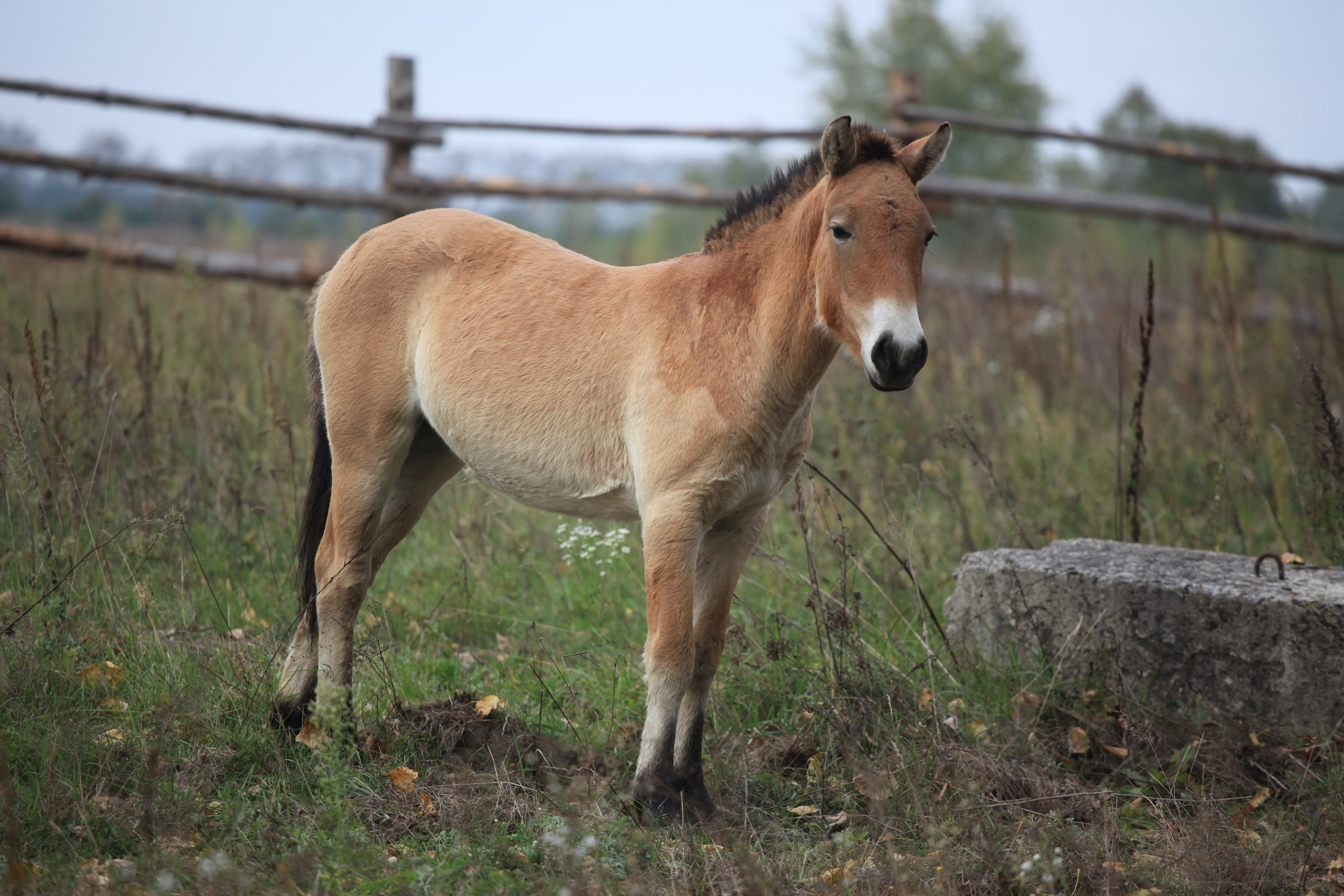
Przewalski's horse in the Chernobyl Exclusion Zone

In 1977, the Foundation for the Preservation and Protection of the Przewalski Horse was founded in Rotterdam, the Netherlands, by Jan and Inge Bouman. The foundation started a program of exchange between captive populations in zoos worldwide to reduce inbreeding and later began its own breeding program. As a result of such efforts, the extant herd has retained a far greater genetic diversity than its genetic bottleneck made likely. By 1979, when this concerted program of population management to maximize genetic diversity was begun, there were almost four hundred horses in sixteen facilities, a number that had grown by the early 1990s to over 1,500.

While dozens of zoos worldwide have Przewalski's horses in small numbers, specialized reserves are also dedicated primarily to the species. The world's largest captive-breeding program for Przewalski's horses is at the Askania Nova preserve in Ukraine. From 1998, thirty-one horses were also released in the unenclosed Chernobyl exclusion zone in Ukraine and Belarus. People evacuated the zone after the Chernobyl disaster, so now it serves as a deserted de facto nature reserve. Though poaching has taken a toll on numbers, as of 2019 the estimated population in the Chernobyl zone was over 100 individuals.

Le Villaret, located in the Cevennes National Park in southern France and run by the Association Takh, is a breeding site for Przewalski's horses that was created to allow the free expression of natural Przewalski's horse behaviors. In 1993, eleven zoo-born horses were brought to Le Villaret. Horses born there are adapted to life in the wild, free to choose their mates, and required to forage independently. This was intended to produce individuals capable of being reintroduced into Mongolia. In 2012, 39 individuals were at Le Villaret. An intensely researched population of free-ranging animals was also introduced to the Hortobágy National Park puszta in Hungary; data on social structure, behavior, and diseases gathered from these animals are used to improve the Mongolian conservation effort. An additional breeding population of Przewalski's horses roams the former Döberitzer Heide military proving ground, now a nature reserve in Dallgow-Döberitz, Germany. Established in 2008, this population comprised 24 horses in 2019. Another population is being established in the Iberian System in Spain, the first free-roaming Przewalski's horses in Western Europe.

In 2024, a Colorado rancher discovered what appeared to be a Przewalski's horse at a Kansas livestock auction, mistakenly identified as a mule. Another similar horse was found at a Utah sanctuary. Genetic tests suggested both are Przewalski's horses, raising concerns about how they ended up in U.S. auctions. One horse, Fiona, was euthanized following apparent organ failure, while the other's fate is unreported.

=== Reintroduction ===
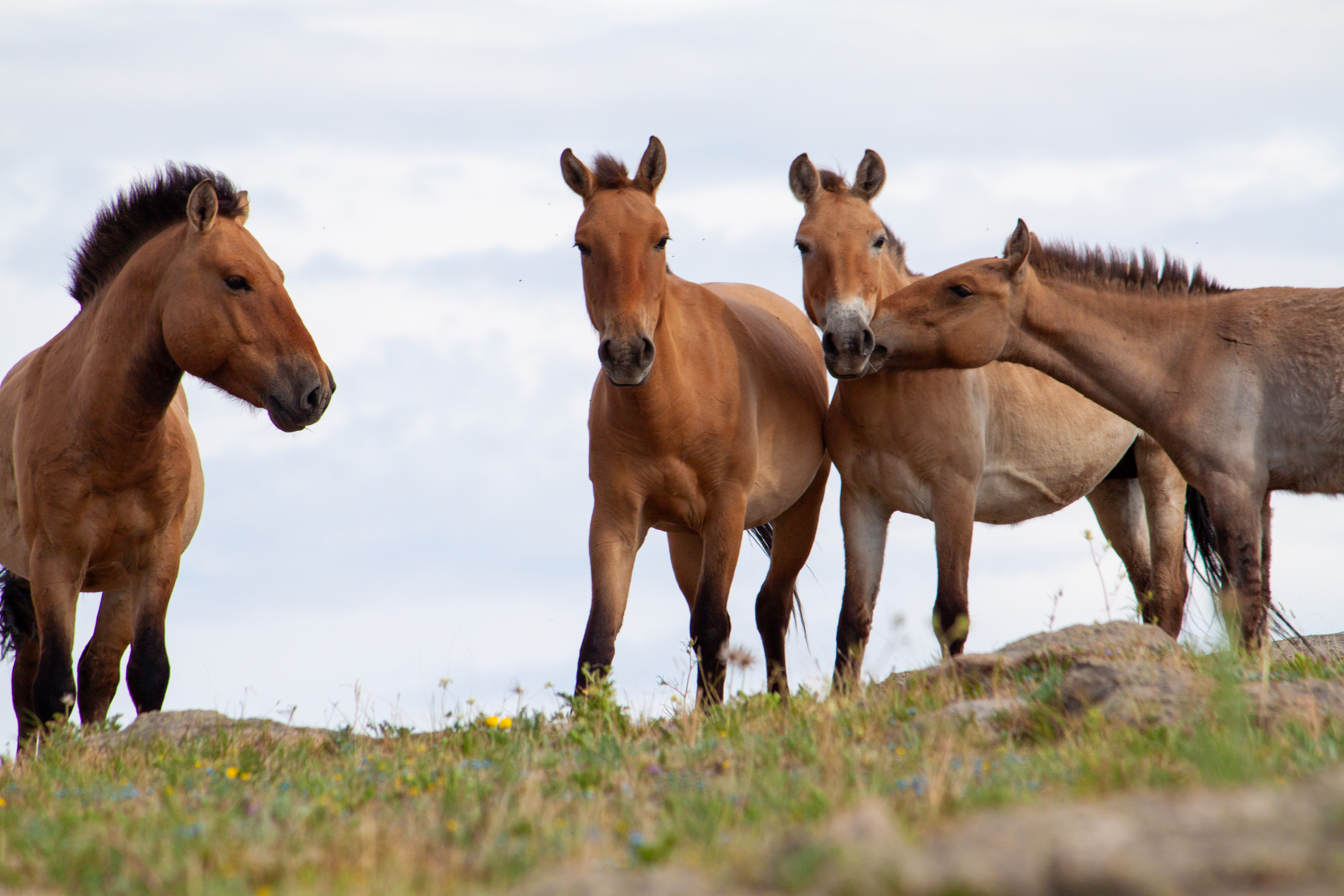
Przewalski's horses in Hustai Nuruu National Park

The Przewalski's Horse Reintroduction Project of China was initiated in 1985 when 11 wild horses were imported from overseas. After more than two decades of effort, the Xinjiang Wild Horse Breeding Centre has bred a large number of horses, 55 of which were released into the Kalamely Mountain area. The animals quickly adapted to their new environment. In 1988, six foals were born and survived, and by 2001, over 100 horses were at the centre. As of 2013, the center hosted 127 horses divided into 13 breeding herds and three bachelor herds.

Reintroductions organized by Western European countries started in the 1990s. Several populations have now been released into the wild. A cooperative venture between the Zoological Society of London and Mongolian scientists has successfully reintroduced these horses from zoos into their natural habitat in Mongolia. In 1992, 16 horses were released into the wild in Mongolia, followed by additional animals later. One of the areas to which they were reintroduced became Khustain Nuruu National Park in 1998. Another reintroduction site is Great Gobi B Strictly Protected Area, located at the fringes of the Gobi Desert.

In 2001, Przewalski's horses were reintroduced into the Kalamaili Nature Reserve in Xinjiang, China.

Since 2004, there has been a program to reintroduce Przewalski's horses that were bred in France into Mongolia. Instrumental to that 2004 reintroduction was Claudia Feh, a Swiss equine specialist and conservation biologist. Feh led an effort to bring together animals that zoos had conserved to create a breeding population in southern France. Then, after it was established, three family groups were relocated to Khovd in western Mongolia. At a site on the northern edge of the Gobi Desert, Feh worked in cooperation with local people to ensure the horses survived and flourished. For this work, Feh received a Rolex Award in 2004.

In 2004 and 2005, 22 horses were released by the Association Takh to a third reintroduction site in the buffer zone of the Khar Us Nuur National Park, in the northern edge of the Gobi ecoregion. In the winter of 2009–2010, one of the worst dzud or snowy winter conditions ever hit Mongolia. The population of Przewalski's horse in the Great Gobi B SPA was drastically affected, providing clear evidence of the risks associated with reintroducing small and sequestered species in unpredictable and unfamiliar environments.

After reintroduced horses had successfully reproduced, the status of the animal was changed from "extinct in the wild" to "endangered" in 2005, while on the IUCN Red List they were reclassified from "extinct in the wild" to "critically endangered", after a reassessment in 2008, and from "critically endangered" to "endangered" after a 2011 reassessment.

In 2011, Prague Zoo started a new project, Return of the Wild Horses. With the support of public and many strategic partners, yearly transports of captive-bred horses into the Great Gobi B Strictly Protected Area continued. as of 2011, an estimated total of almost 400 horses existed in three free-ranging populations in the wild. Prague Zoo has transported horses to Mongolia in several rounds in cooperation with partners (Czech Air Force, European Breeding Programme for Przewalski's Horses, Association pour le cheval de Przewalski: Takh, Czech Development Agency, Czech Embassy in Mongolia, and others). The zoo has the longest uninterrupted history of breeding Przewalski's horses in the world and keeps the studbook of this species.

The first reintroduction into the Orenburg region on the Russian steppe occurred in 2016.

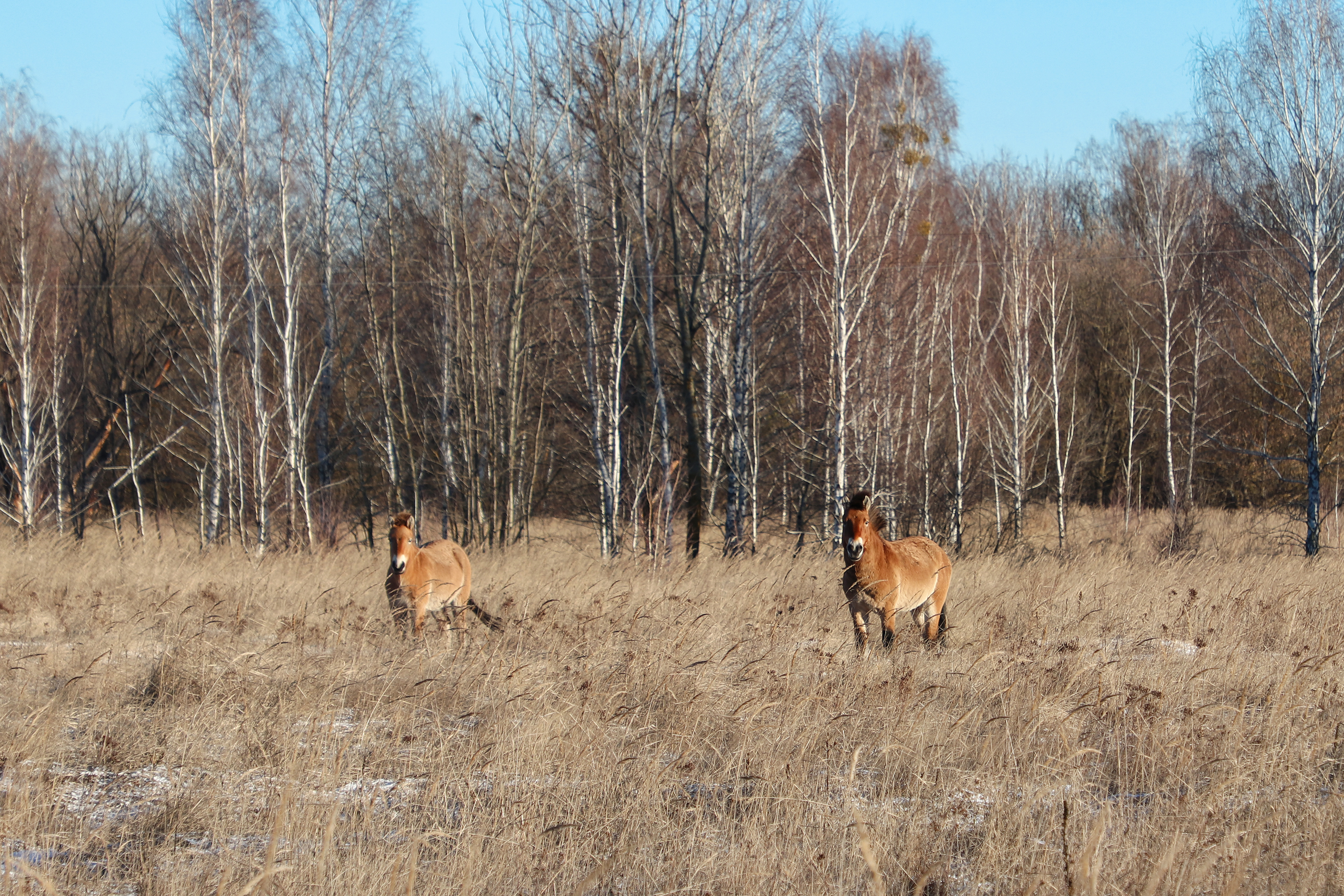
Przewalski’s horse in the Chernobyl Exclusion Zone

In May 2023, a herd of ten Przewalski's horses obtained from Monts D'Azur Biological Reserve in France was introduced by Rewilding Europe to the Iberian Highlands rewilding landscape in Spain, near Villanueva de Alcorón. Following an acclimatization period, the horses were released into the reserve proper in September. This introduction was intended to address the buildup of dense scrub caused by the decrease in traditional sheep grazing due to rural depopulation. The horses are intended to fill a niche similar to that of the extinct European wild horse and of contemporary domesticated herbivores by opening the landscape through low-intensity grazing and browsing, thereby enhancing biodiversity and lowering the risk of forest fires. Future introductions are planned.

In June 2024 six mares and a stallion were reintroduced to Kazakhstan from zoos in Europe, ten years after plans were announced to do so. The operation was organised by Prague Zoo, which selected horses from various programs in Europe, which were housed at Tierpark Berlin for some months before being transported to Kazakhstan in Czech army planes.

=== Assisted reproduction and cloning ===
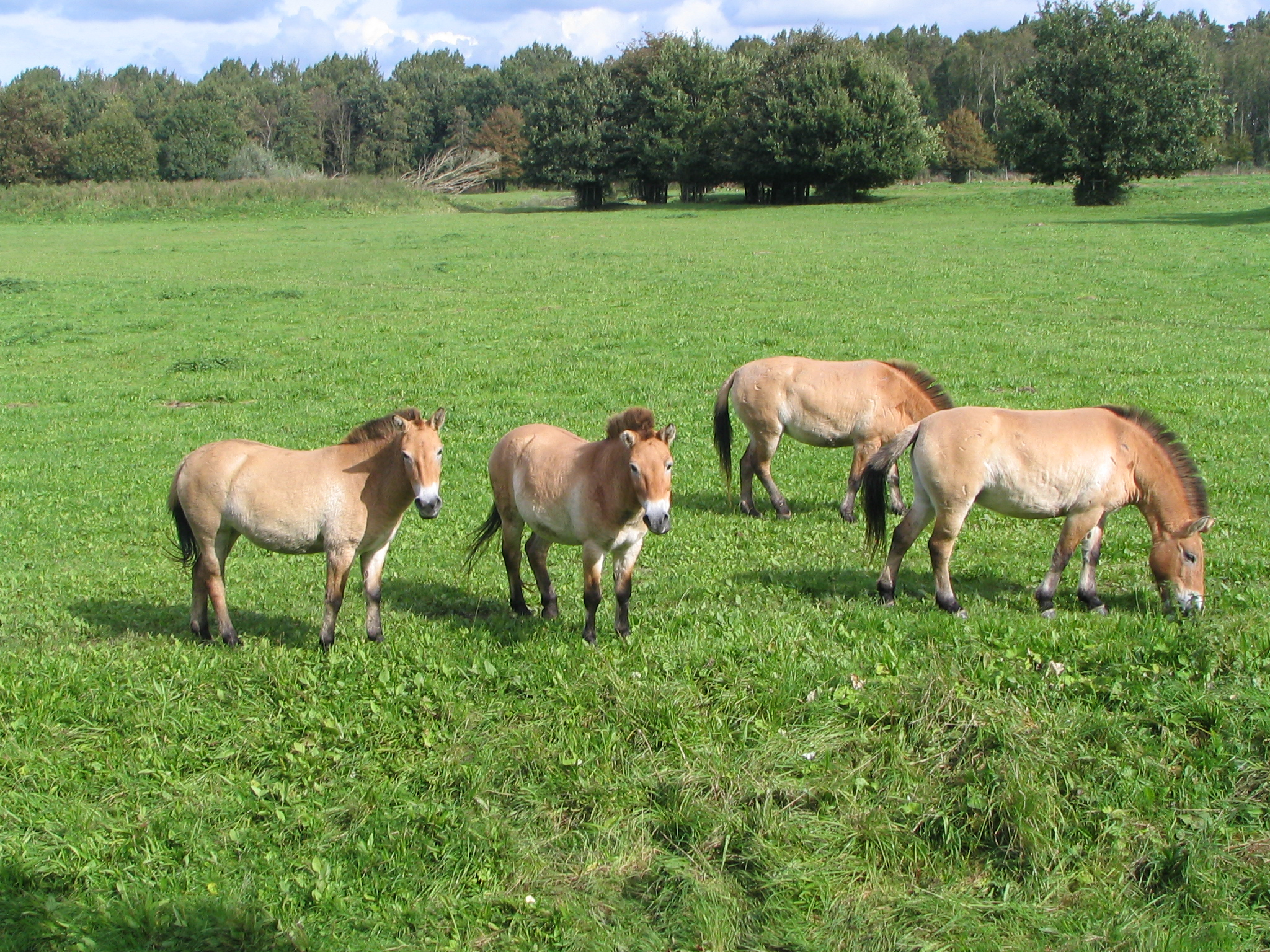
Przewalski's horses

In the earlier decades of captivity, the insular breeding by individual zoos led to inbreeding and reduced fertility. In 1979, several American zoos began a collaborative breeding-exchange program to maximize genetic diversity. Recent advances in equine reproductive science have also been used to preserve and expand the gene pool. Scientists at the Smithsonian Institution's National Zoo successfully reversed a vasectomy on a Przewalski horse in 2007—the first operation of its kind on this species, and possibly the first ever on any endangered species. While normally, a vasectomy may be performed on an endangered animal under limited circumstances, particularly if an individual has already produced many offspring and its genes are overrepresented in the population, scientists realized the animal in question was one of the most genetically valuable Przewalski's horses in the North American breeding program. The first birth by artificial insemination occurred on 27 July 2013 at the Smithsonian Conservation Biology Institute.

In 2020, the first cloned Przewalski's horse was born, the result of a collaboration between San Diego Zoo Global, ViaGen Pets & Equine, and Revive & Restore. The cloning was carried out by somatic cell nuclear transfer (SCNT), whereby a viable embryo is created by transplanting the DNA-containing nucleus of a somatic cell into an immature egg cell (oocyte) that has had its nucleus removed, producing offspring genetically identical to the somatic cell donor. Since the oocyte used was from a domestic horse, this was an example of interspecies SCNT.

The somatic cell donor was a Przewalski horse stallion named Kuporovic, born in the UK in 1975 and relocated three years later to the US, where he died in 1998. Due to concerns over the loss of genetic variation in the captive Przewalski's horse population, and in anticipation of the development of new cloning techniques, tissue from the stallion was cryopreserved at the San Diego Zoo's Frozen Zoo. Breeding of this individual in the 1980s had already substantially increased the genetic diversity of the captive population after he was discovered to have more unique alleles than any other horse living at the time, including otherwise lost genetic material from two of the original captive founders. To produce the clone, frozen skin fibroblasts were thawed, and grown in cell culture. An oocyte was collected from a domestic horse, and its nucleus replaced by a nucleus collected from a cultured Przewalski's horse fibroblast. The resulting embryo was induced to begin division. It was cultured until it reached the blastocyst stage, then implanted into a domestic horse surrogate mare, which carried the embryo to term and delivered a foal with the Przewalski horse DNA of the long-deceased stallion.

The cloned horse was named Kurt, after Dr. Kurt Benirschke, a geneticist who developed the idea of cryopreserving genetic material from species considered to be endangered. His ideas led to creating the Frozen Zoo as a genetic library. In 2021, Kurt was relocated to the breeding herd at the San Diego Zoo Safari Park. In order to integrate him into the existing herd, Kurt was partnered with a young female named Holly, a few months older than him, in order to allow him to learn the social and communication behaviors of wild Przewalski's horses. On reaching maturity at three to four years of age, Kurt is intended to become the breeder stallion for the San Diego Zoo herd to pass Kuporovic's genes into the larger captive Przewalski's horse population and thereby increase the genetic variation of the species.

In 2023, a genetic twin of Kurt, named Ollie, was born from cloning with the help of the San Diego Zoo Global Frozen Zoo. It is the first reported case of any endangered species having more than one clone successfully produced. This individual eventually joins Kurt and Holly at the San Diego Zoo Safari Park. Due to having been conceived through the transfer of a somatic cell nucleus into an egg cell obtained from a domestic horse donor, Kurt and Ollie both display the mitochondrial genome of domestic horses instead of belonging to a Przewalski horse mitochondrial clade. However, as mitochondrial DNA is maternally inherited, they will not pass on these domestic horse genes.

== See also ==
- Mongolian horse (domestic)
- Mongolian wild ass
