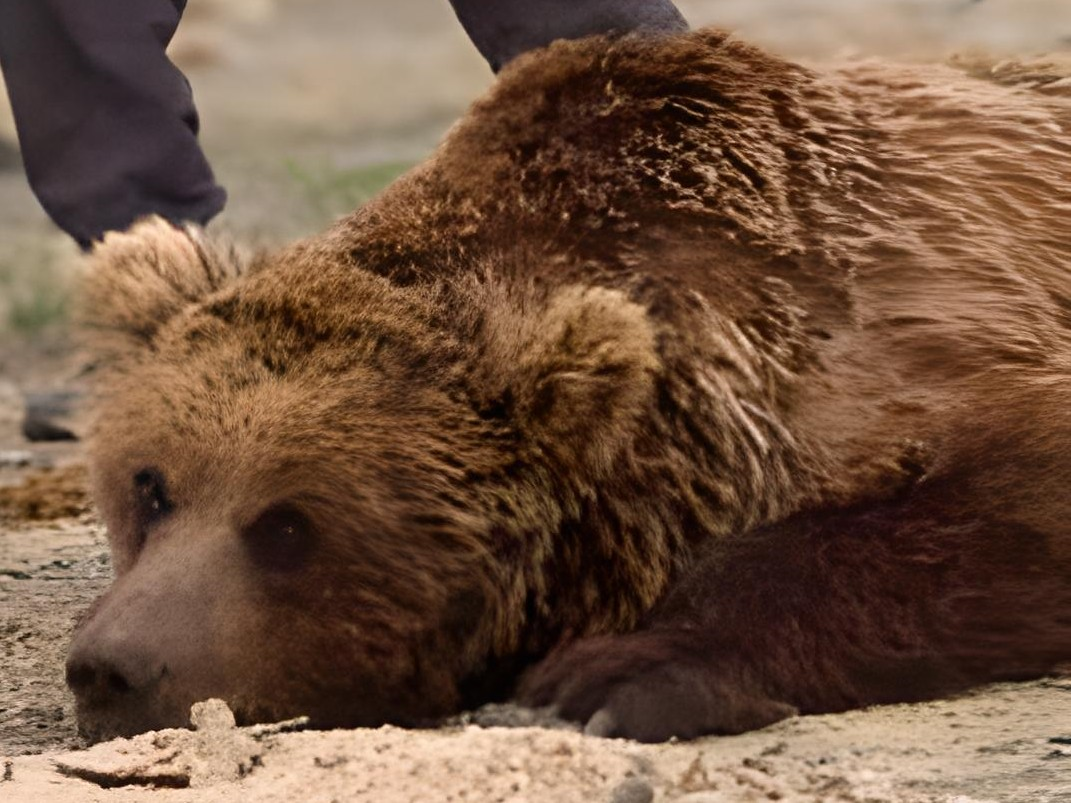

Conservation status
- Critically Endangered (IUCN 3.1)

Scientific classification
- Kingdom: Animalia
- Phylum: Chordata
- Class: Mammalia
- Infraclass: Placentalia
- Order: Carnivora
- Family: Ursidae
- Subfamily: Ursinae
- Genus: Ursus
- Species: U. arctos
- Subspecies: U. a. gobiensis

Trinomial name
- Ursus arctos gobiensis Sokolov & Orlov, 1920

= Gobi bear =

Subspecies of carnivore

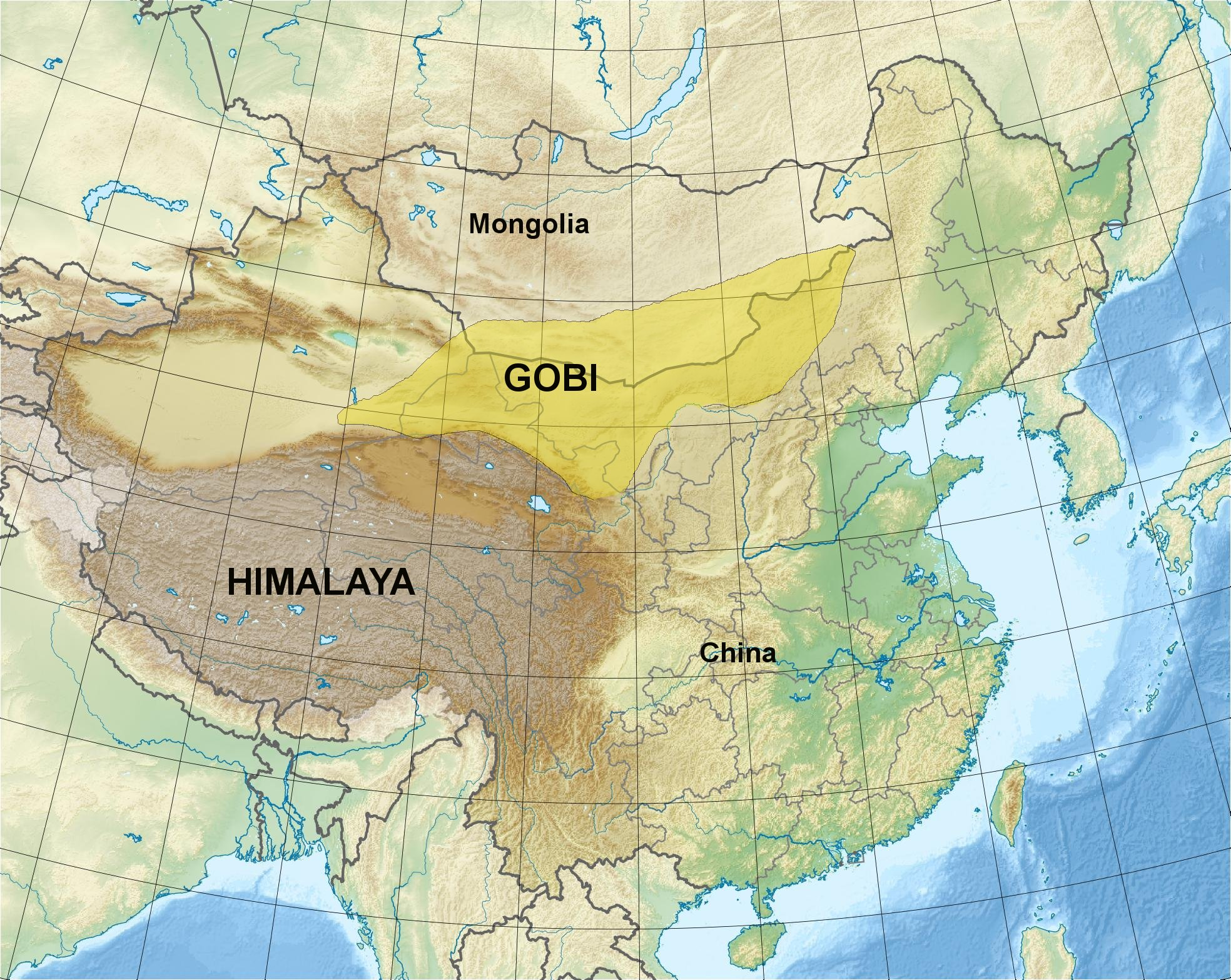
The location of the Gobi Desert (yellow) in Mongolia and China

The Gobi bear (Ursus arctos gobiensis), known in Mongolian as the Mazaalai (Мазаалай), is a critically endangered subspecies of the brown bear (Ursus arctos) found in the Gobi Desert of Mongolia. There may be fewer than 50 individuals in the wild, with a relatively stable but likely decreasing population.

== Description ==
The Gobi bear is small compared to other brown bear subspecies: adult males weigh about 96–138 kilograms (212–304 pounds) and females about 51–78 kg (112–172 lb). Gobi bears are the only bears that have evolved and adapted to living in such extreme hot desert climates. They have a very low genetic diversity, among the lowest ever observed in any subspecies of brown bear, as it is one of the smallest and most isolated brown bear populations in the world. Levels of genetic diversity similar to those of the Gobi bears have been reported only in a small population of brown bears in the Pyrenees Mountains on the border of Spain and France.

The diet of a Gobi bear is about 8% animal protein. Gobi bears mainly eat roots, berries, other plants, and sometimes rodents; there is no evidence that they prey on large mammals. Gobi bears are typically solitary, except during the mating season and cub rearing. In general, the bears in the Gobi demonstrate seasonal behaviors: foraging is done during the warmer months, while hibernation with reduced activity is done during the harsh winters.

== Taxonomy ==
Previously, the Gobi brown bear has sometimes been classified as being in the same subspecies as the Tibetan blue bear based on geography or the Himalayan brown bear based on mitochondrial short fragment studies. However, whole-genome and larger mitochondrial DNA analyses have revealed that Gobi and Himalayan brown bears are distinct lineages that have a shared ancestry; collectively, they are the oldest lineage in their divergence time from all other brown bears.

== Distribution ==
The Gobi bear is found in the Gobi Desert of Mongolia.

== Conservation ==
The Gobi bear is listed as critically endangered by the International Union for Conservation of Nature and the Mongolian Redbook of Endangered Species. Habitat loss, climate change, and human encroachment have affected its ecology. In 1959, hunting of the animal was prohibited. A total of 51 bears were found in the wild from 1996 to 2018, but the population trend was stable and the estimate was 31 based on a long-term genetic study published in 2021. The population is relatively stable, with a higher ratio of males.

Its population is restricted to 23,600 km^{2} (9,100 mi^{2}) in areas that are in close proximity to water sources and is isolated from other brown bear populations by inhospitable low-elevation deserts, pastoral activities, and human settlements. A supplemental feeding program has been in place since 1985; pellets containing wheat (Triticum aestivum), corn (Zea mays), carrots (Daucus carota subsp. sativus), and turnips (Brassica rapa) are provided in spring and autumn at feeders located near selected waterholes throughout the Great Gobi strictly protected areas in southwestern Mongolia.

== See also ==
- Great Gobi A Strictly Protected Area
- Great Gobi B Strictly Protected Area
