= Bayantooroi, Govi-Altai =

Bag in Tsogt, Govi-Altai, Mongolia

Coordinates: 44°55′29″N 96°45′18″E

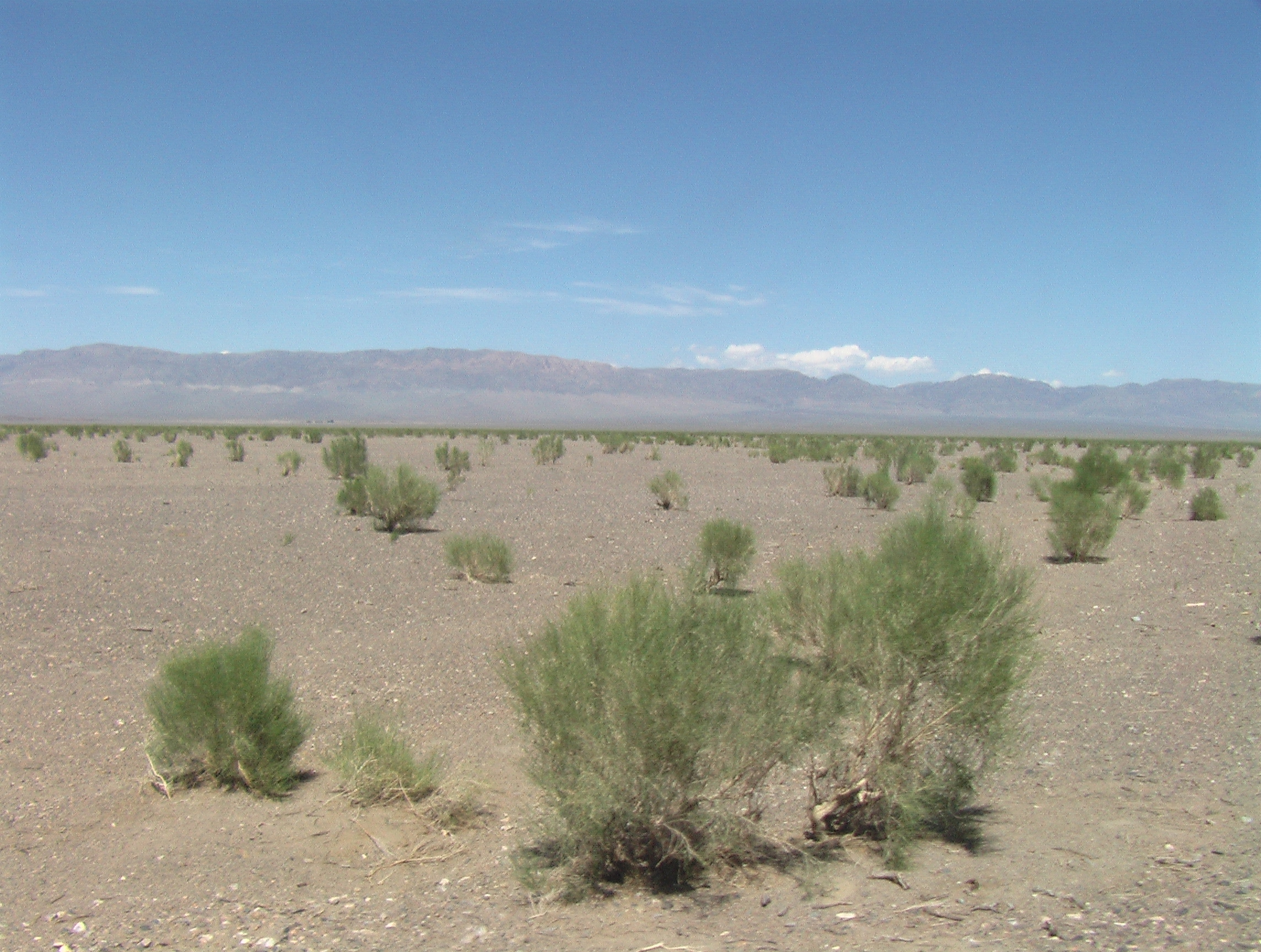
Gobi Desert landscape around Bayantooroi

Bayantooroi (Mongolian: Баянтоорой) is a bag in Tsogt sum (district) of Govi-Altai Province, Mongolia.

Bayantooroi is an irrigated cropping settlement in a Gobi Desert oasis, 62 km south of Tsogt sum center. The headquarters for the Great Gobi A and the Great Gobi B Strictly Protected Areas are in Bayantooroi. Eej Khairkhan Uul natural monument is 50 km west of Bayantooroi.
