= Great Gobi A Strictly Protected Area =

Nature reserve in southwestern Mongolia

Coordinates: 43°14′24″N 97°25′48″E

The Great Gobi A Strictly Protected Area is a nature reserve in the Gobi Desert, situated in the southwestern part of Mongolia at the border with China. A similar reserve in the Gobi exists further to the west - the Great Gobi B Strictly Protected Area. Both reserves form one unit, the Great Gobi Strictly Protected Area (SPA), that encompasses a total of 53,000 km^{2} (20,000 sq mi). Great Gobi A is one of the last refuges for critically endangered animals such as the wild Bactrian camel and the Gobi bear.

== Location and size ==
Great Gobi A lies in the southwestern part of Mongolia in an arid region of the Gobi Desert. The vegetation is dominated by desert and desert steppe. Great Gobi A is generally drier than Great Gobi B. Together with Great Gobi B, the reserve was established in 1975 and was designated by the United Nations as an international Biosphere Reserve in 1991. With a total area of about 46,369 km^{2} (17,903 sq mi), it is one of the largest reserves in the world. The headquarters for the Great Gobi SPA is situated in Bayantooroi, a settlement about 20 km (12 mi) north to the Great Gobi A reserve.

== Climate ==
The Climate is extremely "continental". Temperatures in the Gobi can fall to −40 °C (−40 °F) in winter and rise to 40 °C (104 °F) in the summer. With an average yearly rainfall of about 100 mm (3.9 in), the climate is extremely arid.

== Fauna ==
The reserve is an important refuge for several endangered large mammal species, such as the wild Bactrian camel (Camelus ferus, distinct species identified 2008), the Gobi bear (Ursus arctos gobiensis), the snow leopard (Uncia uncia), the argali wild sheep (Ovis ammon) and the Mongolian wild ass (Equus hemionus hemionus). The reserve is especially important for the wild camel as it is one of three remaining locations where the rare and endangered animal can be found. It is difficult to estimate population numbers or population trends for most species in the reserve due to its remote location and large size. Estimates for the population of wild camels in the reserve range from about 350 to 1950 individuals. Wolves (Canis lupus), which are also found in the reserve, may be a threat for the calves of wild camels. However, the effects of these predators on the camel population are unclear.

The Zakhyn Us wild camel breeding centre, established in 2004 with 12 wild camels that had been caught by Mongolian herdsmen, is located twenty kilometres from the reserve. In 2014, there were 22 wild camels at the breeding centre and in 2013, two bull wild camels were released into the reserve with satellite collars. One went on to form his own herd with five female wild camels. The breeding centre that is financed by the Wild Camel Protection Foundation and administered by the Director of Gobi "A" covers 40 hectares (99 acres). In 2008, the Veterinary University of Vienna confirmed after extensive DNA testing that the Bactrian wild camel is a new and different species which separated from any other known camel species over 750,000 years ago.
