= Kalamely Mountain =

Mountain in People's Republic of China

- 卡拉麦里山

Geography
- Location: on the eastern edge of the Junggar Basin in Xinjiang

Kalamely Mountain (Chinese: 卡拉麦里山, "Kalamely" means "black earth" in Kazakh), also spelled Kalamaili Mountain, is a low mountain range running east–west with an elevation of only 800-1473 meters in China, located on the eastern edge of the Junggar Basin in Xinjiang. It is an important gold-bearing belt in the Eastern Jungar region.

In 1966, humanity saw the Przewalski's horses in the wild for the last time, and in 1985, China introduced 11 wild Przewalski's horses from abroad, launching the Przewalski's horse reintroduction project. After more than two decades of efforts, the Xinjiang Wild Horse Breeding Center bred a large number of Przewalski's horses, 55 of which were released to the Kalamely Mountain.

Raptor breeding grounds have been severely damaged by large-scale mining and quarrying in the Kalamely Mountain since 2008.

== Mountain Kalamely Ungulate Nature Reserve ==
The Mountain Kalamely Ungulate Nature Reserve, named after Kalamely Mountain, was established in 1982.
