= Kalamaili Nature Reserve =

Natural reserve in Xinjiang, China

Coordinates: 45°N 89°E

Kalamely Nature Reserve
- 卡拉麦里山有蹄类自然保护区
- Interactive map of Kalamely Nature Reserve
- Location: Xinjiang, China
- Established: April 1982

Mountain Kalamaili Ungulate Nature Reserve (Kalamaili means "black earth" in Kazakh, Chinese: 卡拉麦里山有蹄类自然保护区), also spelled Kalamely Nature Reserve, is a nature reserve in Xinjiang Autonomous Region of China, targeting in preserving the wildlife and natural vegetations in the arid steppe ecosystem. As one of the largest nature reserves in China, established in April 1982, it stretches from the Ulungur River in the north, across the heart of Dzungarian Basin, and reaches to the northern extension of Tianshan Mountains in the south, covering an area of more than 14,000 km^{2} (5,400 sq mi).

In February 2019, the Kalamely Nature Reserve was listed as a state-level nature reserve in China.

== Wildlife ==
Kalamaili Nature Reserve harbors many symbolic species in its arid steppe landscape. Mongolian wild ass (Equus hemionus hemionus), goitered gazelle (Gazella subgutturosa), Mongolian wolf (Canis lupus chanco), red fox (Vulpes vulpes) are the common ungulate and carnivorous inhabitants. A recent survey showed there were 3128 to 4711 wild asses and 11366 to 16235 goitered gazelles living in Kalamaili. Argali sheep (Ovis ammon) and wild Bactrian camel (Camelus ferus) are also reported but very rare.

Przewalski's horse (Equus ferus przewalskii) has been reintroduced to Kalamaili by Xinjiang Forestry Department since 2001. After initial difficulties, the population is now distributed in the center of the reserve, at the western part of Mt. Kalamaili. The stabilized and healthy population breeds and grows in the wild each year. By the end of 2010, the population reached to 70 individuals (5 harem groups and 1 to 2 bachelor groups). Kalamaili Nature Reserve, Xinjiang Wild Horse Breeding Center, Beijing Forestry University, the National Zoo in Washington, D.C., and Princeton University have been monitoring this population for many years and conducting a series of extensive researches on the population dynamics, behaviors, physiology, genetics, and conservation.

== Local community ==
Kazakh people have been using Kalamaili as their traditional winter pasture as part of their culture. Every fall before the snow, Kazakh nomads herd their livestock—mostly sheep, camels and horses—from the summer pastures in the alpine meadow of Altai Mountain down to the southern Kalamaili, where winter is milder and snow cover is thinner. They stay in their winter tent and fence the livestock in a pen surrounded by fecal brick walls. When snow is gone (normally around late March to April) they leave Kalamaili and go back to their summer pastures. Although Chinese government is conducting the nomadic pastoralists settlement project in Xinjiang by building houses, fixed pens, and other public facilities, there is still a big proportion of Kazakh herdsmen keeping this nomadic tradition.

== See also ==
- Przewalski's horse
- Kalamely Mountain
- Xinjiang
