= Tsogt, Govi-Altai =

District in Govi-Altai Province, Mongolia

Coordinates: 45°20′48″N 96°38′36″E

Tsogt District Цогт сум ᠴᠣᠭᠲᠤᠰᠤᠮᠤ
- District
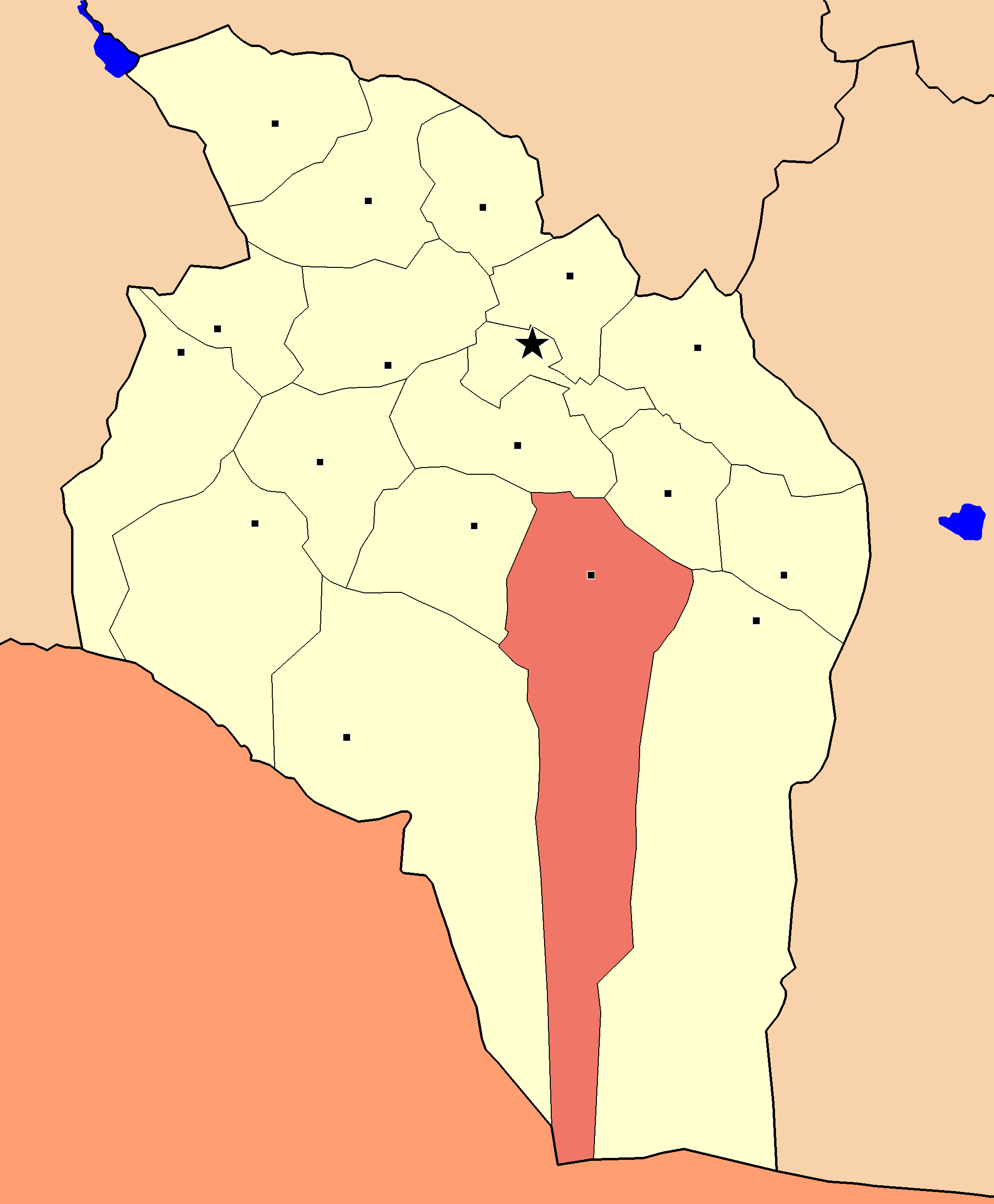
- Tsogt District in Govi-Altai Province
- Country: Mongolia
- Province: Govi-Altai Province

Area
  - Total: 16,618 km^{2} (6,416 sq mi)
- Time zone: UTC+8 (UTC + 8)

Tsogt (Mongolian: Цогт, mighty) is a sum (district) of Govi-Altai Province in western Mongolia. In the part of the sum territory that overlaps with the Gobi Desert, there is a settlement called Bayantooroi. In 2009, its population was 3,697.

== Administrative divisions ==
The district is divided into seven bags, which are:

- Bayan-Ulaan
- Bayan-Undur
- Bayantooroi
- Dalan
- Gegeet
- Rashaant
- Tugrug
