= Return of the Wild Horses =

Reintroduction project

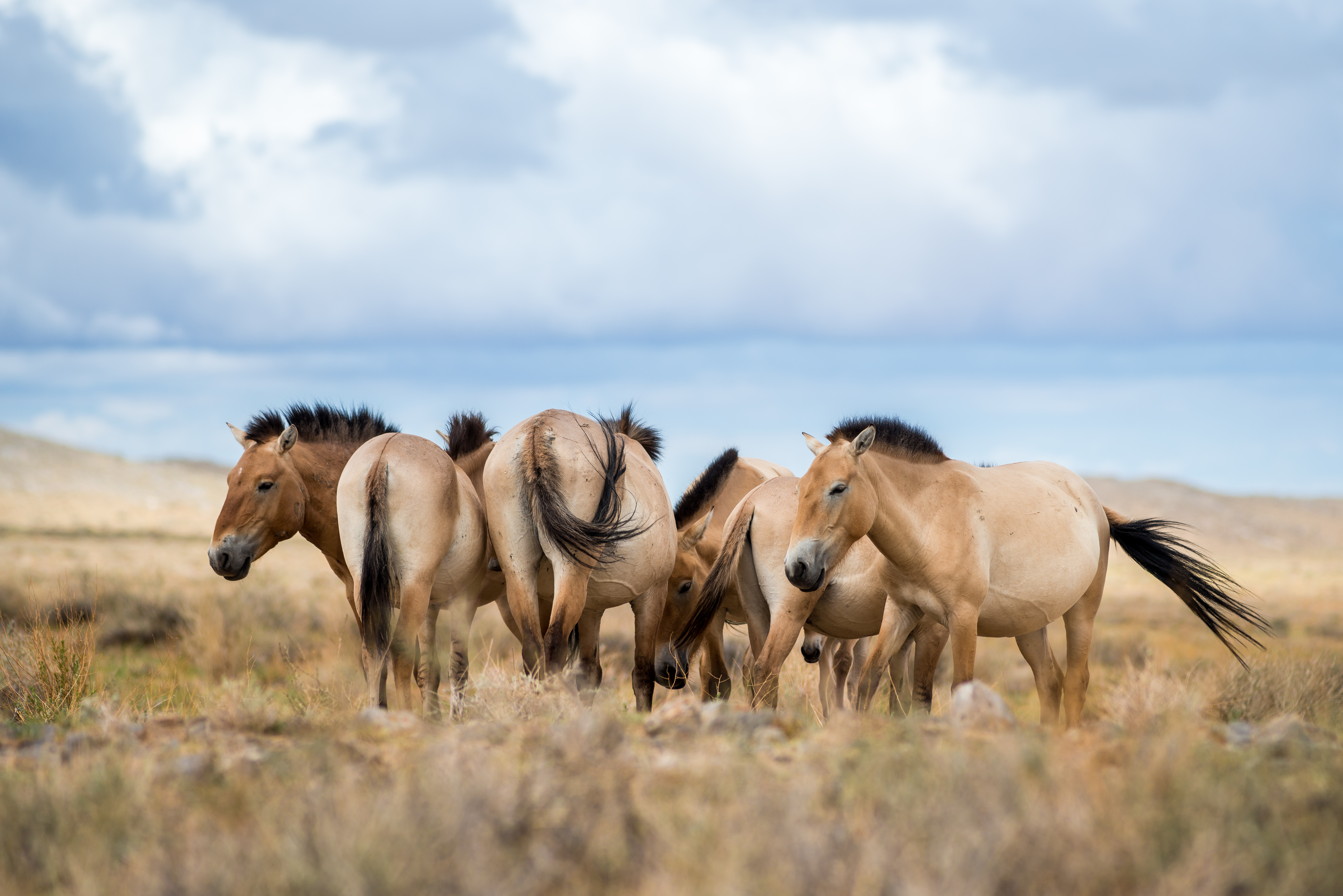
Przewalski's horses in Gobi

Return of the Wild Horses is an in-situ conservation project organized by Prague Zoo. Its aim is to increase the numbers and genetic diversity of Przewalski's horses in their native habitat in Mongolia. Resuming previous similar European projects, Return of the Wild Horses transports and reintroduces captive-bred wild horses into large nature reserves in Mongolia, the project also provides material support to Mongolian rangers who protect and monitor the herds in Great Gobi B Strictly Protected Area. Through yearly transports of horses from the Czech Republic starting in 2011, Zoo Prague managed to increase the population of wild horses in Khomyn Tal by 34 animals.

== Development of the project ==
Prague Zoo manages the international Przewalski's horse studbook since 1959, in 1997 it joined the reintroduction efforts in Mongolia, contributing four of its horses to Takhin Tal Nature Reserve and Khustain Nuruu National Park. Prague Zoo exhibits and breeds horses in Prague and keeps a core herd in its Przewalski's Horse Breeding and Acclimatization Facility in Dolní Dobřejov (Střezimíř municipality).

The management office of Great Gobi B Strictly Protected Area was opened in 2006 and began cooperating with Prague Zoo, who continues to provide important material and technical support to park management and guards such as satellite phones, GPS navigation, microscopes, binoculars, off-road cars, motorcycles, guardhouses, hay barns, diesel generator and a well. In 2007, Prague Zoo joined the International Takhi Group.

The horses suitable for release are selected and transported from European zoos as well as from the core herd in Dobřejov. Once a year four of these are loaded in boxes, taken by car to airport, lifted by Czech Army cargo plane to Mongolia, then travel to their destination on lorries. After some time spent in acclimatization pen, they are released into the wild. The project is supported by Czech Army, Czech Development Agency, Czech and Mongolian embassies, public donations and proceeds from Prague Zoo ticket sales.

== Yearly transports of horses ==
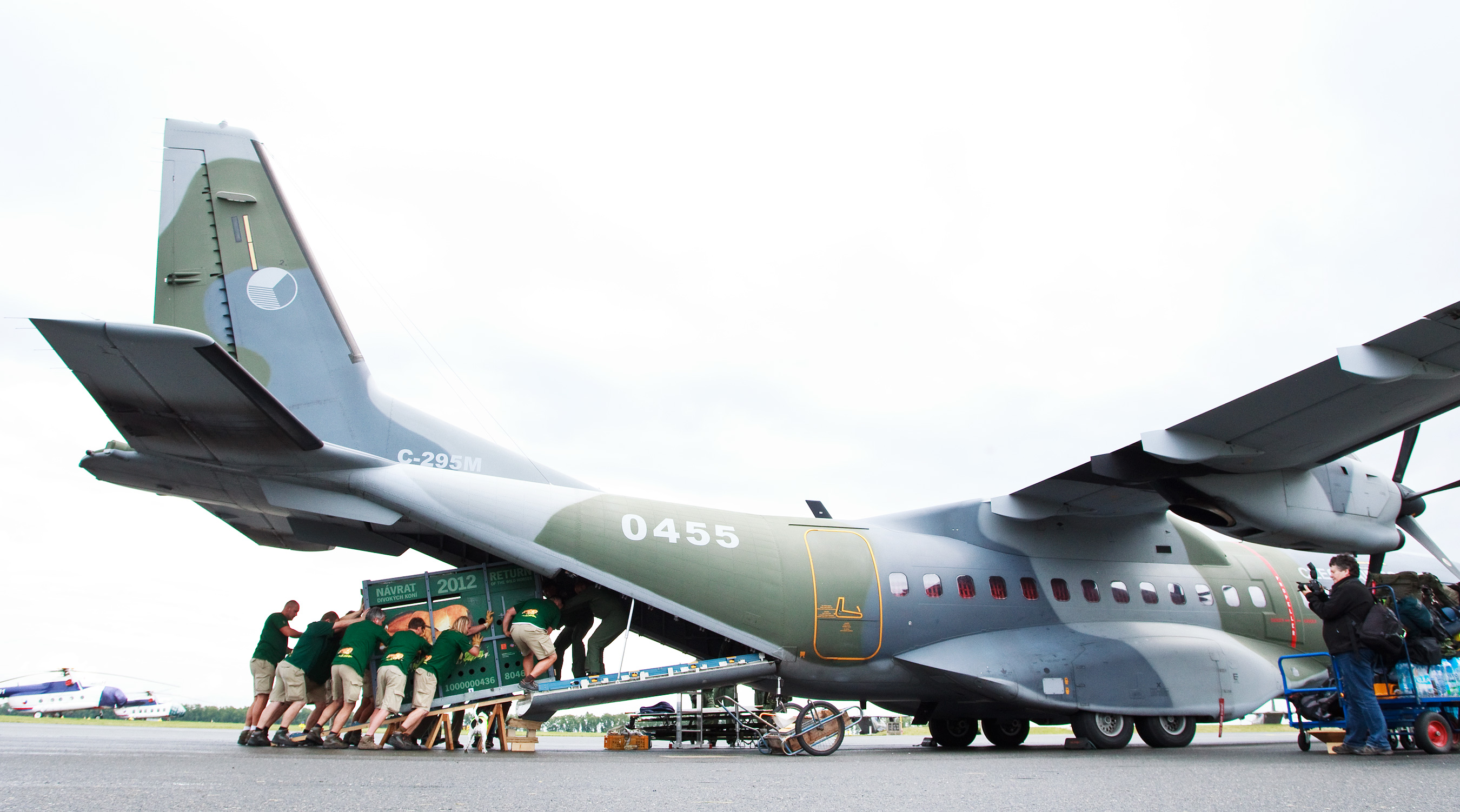
Loading the horses in boxes into the plane in Prague

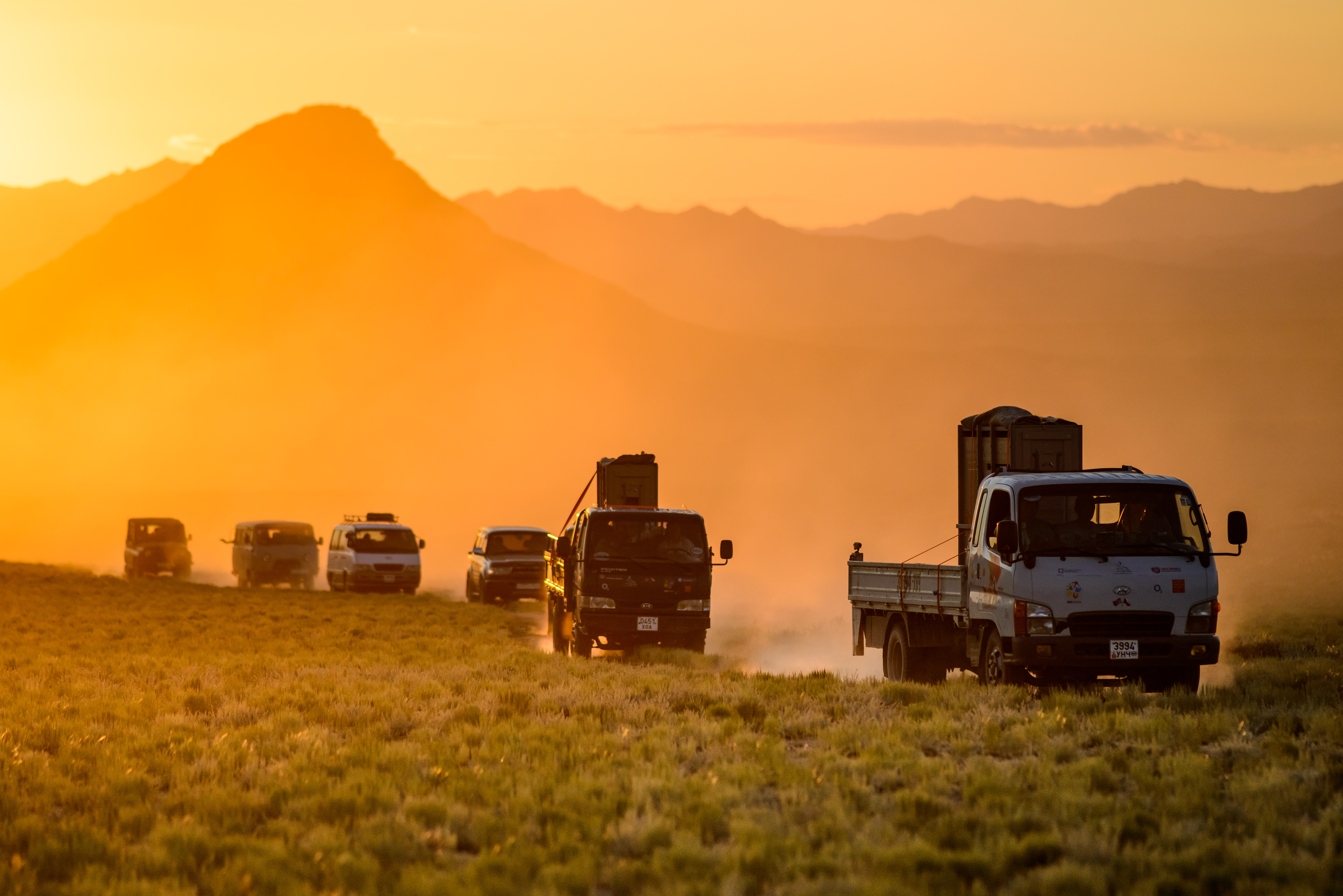
Transport by lorries in Mongolia

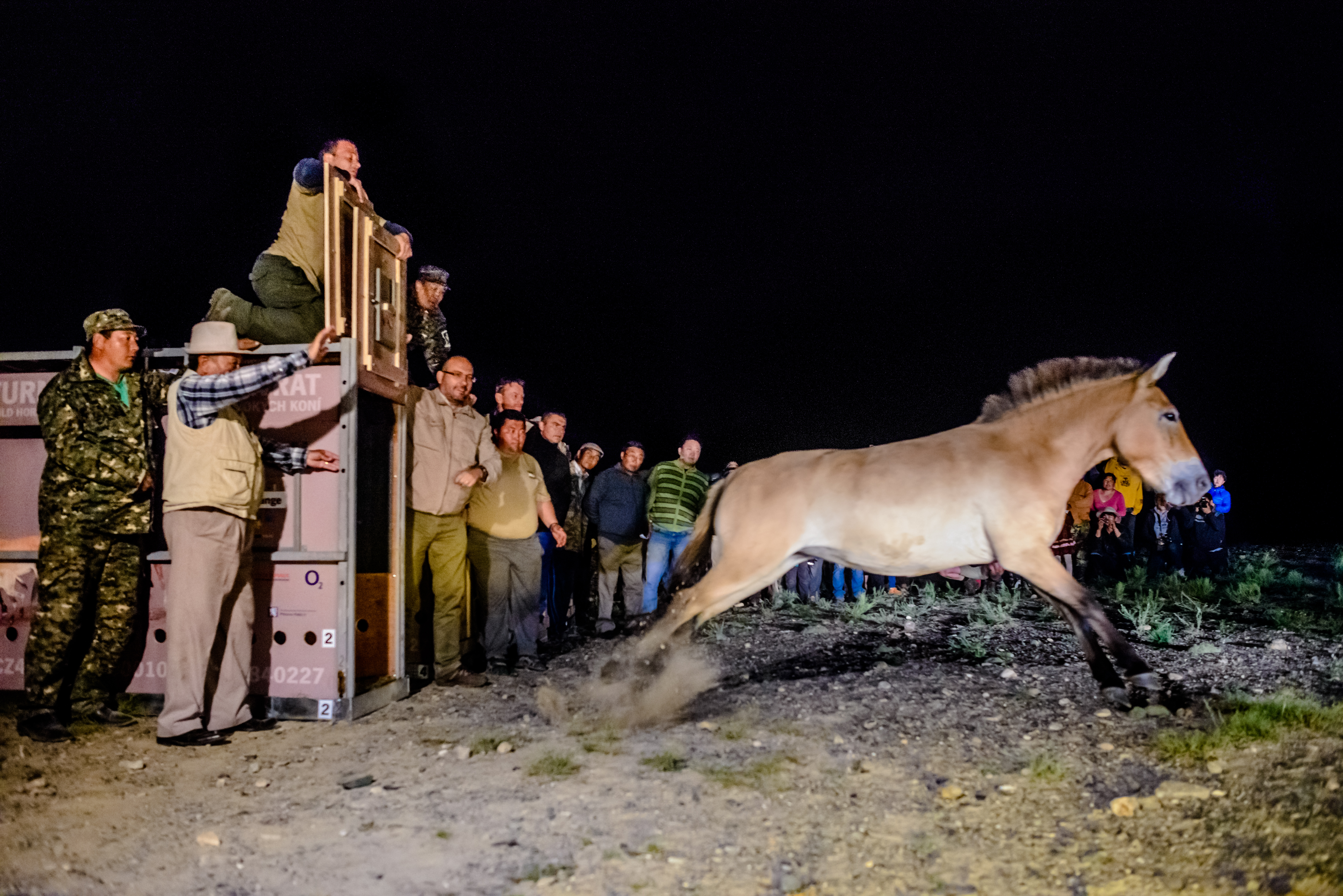
Release into the acclimatization pen

The first four Przewalski's horses were transported to Khomyn Tal in 2011. All following transports have been headed to Great Gobi B Strictly Protected Area. The total number of reintroduced horses from Czech Republic so far is 34. Four more horses were transported by Prague Zoo within Mongolia during the eighth Return of the Wild Horses, from Khustain Nuruu National Park near Ulaanbaatar to Takhin Tal Nature Reserve in Gobi B. Great Gobi B Strictly Protected Area is now home to more than 270 Przewalski's horses, the transported horses have formed or joined the local herds and reproduce successfully.

Year	Destination	Number of horses
2011	Khomyn Tal	4 horses (1 stallion, 3 mares)
2012	Gobi B	4 mares
2013	Gobi B	4 mares
2014	Gobi B	3 mares
2015	Gobi B	4 mares
2016	Gobi B	4 mares + 4 horses within Mongolia (1 stallion, 3 mares)
2017	Gobi B	4 mares
2018	Gobi B	4 mares
2019	Gobi B	3 mares

== See also ==
- Wildlife conservation
- Reintroduction
- in-situ conservation
