= Villanueva de Alcorón =

Villanueva de Alcorón, Spain
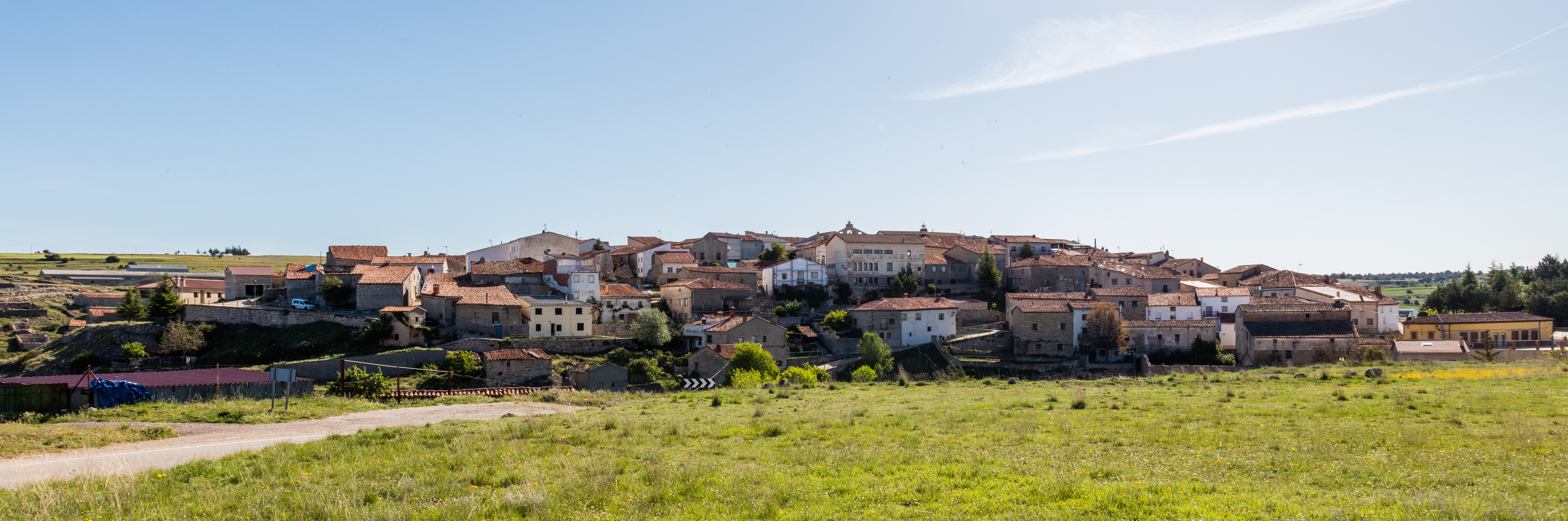

- Location within Province of Guadalajara Location within Castilla-La Mancha Location within Spain
- Coordinates: 40°40′48″N 2°15′07″W
- Country: Spain
- Autonomous community: Castile-La Mancha
- Province: Guadalajara
- Municipality: Villanueva de Alcorón

Area
  - Total: 99 km^{2} (38 sq mi)

Population (2025-01-01)
  - Total: 140
  - Density: 1.4/km^{2} (3.7/sq mi)
- Time zone: UTC+1 (CET)
  - Summer (DST): UTC+2 (CEST)

Villanueva de Alcorón is a municipality located in the province of Guadalajara, Castile-La Mancha, Spain. According to the 2004 census (INE), the municipality has a population of 269 inhabitants.
