= Great Gobi B Strictly Protected Area =

Nature reserve within Mongolia

Coordinates: 45°24′00″N 92°54′00″E

Great Gobi B Strictly Protected Area is a nature reserve in Gobi Desert, situated in the southwestern part of Mongolia at the border with China. A similar reserve in a drier part of the Gobi exists further to the east - the Great Gobi A Strictly Protected Area.

== Landscape ==
The reserve was established in 1975 and declared an International Biosphere Reserve in 1991. It comprises about 9000 km^{2} of desert steppe, arid mountains, deserts and semi deserts. Temperatures can fall to -40 °C in winter and rise to +40 °C in the summer. Average snow cover lasts 97 days per year. There are low mountains in the east of the reserve and rolling hills in the west. The lowest parts are about 1000 m above sea level, the highest point is reached at the Chinese border at about 2840 m.

== Fauna ==
The Przewalski horse, which was completely extinct in the wild, has been reintroduced to the reserve. Other larger ungulates, which are found in the reserve are the goitered gazelle, and the Mongolian wild ass. Siberian ibex are common in the mountains, whereas argalis have become rare. The main predator is the Mongolian wolf. Snow leopards and Siberian lynxes are rare. Smaller carnivores are the red fox, the corsac fox, the Asiatic wildcat, and the Pallas's cat.

There are 110 families with nearly 60,000 heads of livestock in the reserve.

== See also ==
- Return of the Wild Horses, current project of yearly transportation of Przewalski's horses from the Czech Republic and their reintroduction to Great Gobi B
