= Boreray Blackface =

Scottish breed of sheep

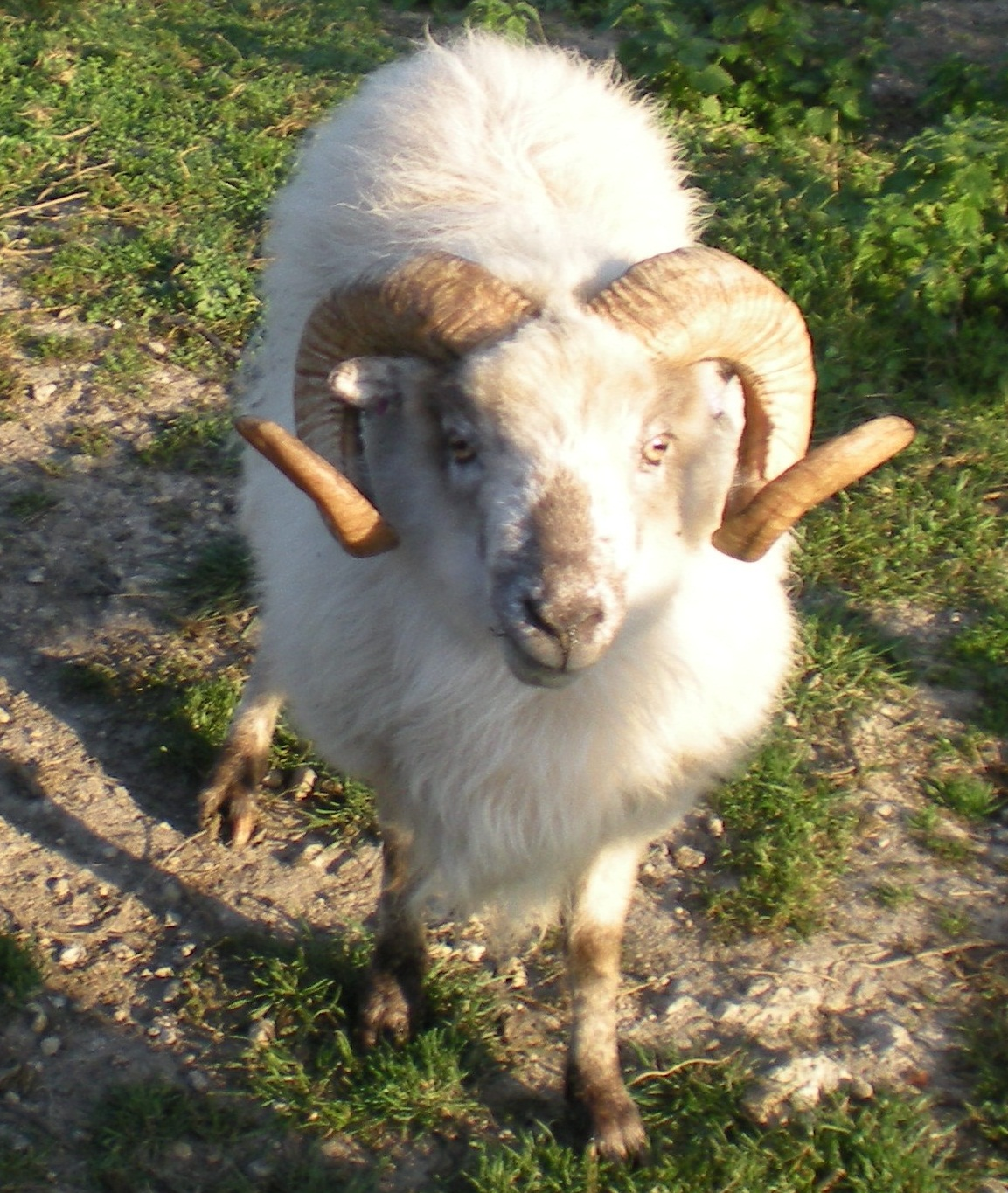
- A ram

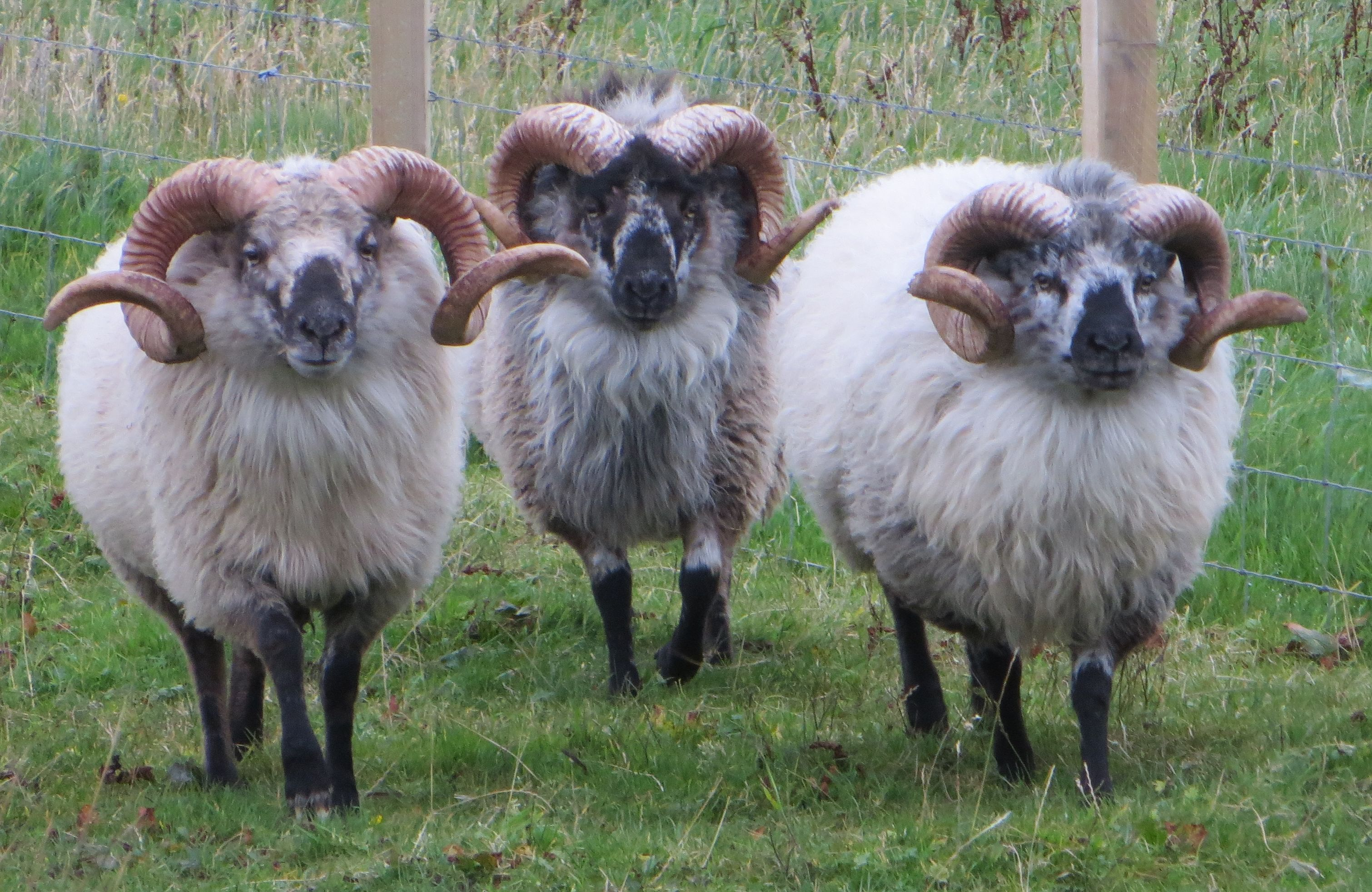
- Rams on Orkney
- Conservation status: FAO (2007): critical-maintained; RBST (2025): at risk; DAD-IS (2025): at risk/endangered
- Other names: Boreray; Hebridean Blackface
- Country of origin: Scotland
- Distribution: Boreray, St Kilda
- Use: conservation grazing; meat; wool

Traits
- Weight: Male: 45 kg; Female: 30 kg
- Height: Male: 55 cm; Female: 55 cm
- Horn status: horned in both sexes

The Boreray Blackface, also Hebridean Blackface or Boreray, is a rare Scottish breed of sheep originating on the St Kilda archipelago off the west coast of Scotland and surviving as a feral animal on one of the islands, Boreray. It was once reared for meat and wool, but is now used mainly for conservation grazing. It falls within the Northern European short-tailed group of breeds.

It is an endangered breed, and in 2025 was classified by the Rare Breeds Survival Trust as "priority", the second level of concern of the trust. It is one of eight rare British breeds registered in the Combined Flock Book, a herd-book established in 1974; the others are the Castlemilk Moorit, the Manx Loaghtan, the Norfolk Horn, the North Ronaldsay, the Portland, the Soay and the Whitefaced Woodland.

== St Kilda sheep ==
St Kilda is a remote archipelago, west of the Outer Hebrides. Several types of sheep have been associated with St Kilda. In addition to the Boreray, these include the Soay sheep, a feral type from Soay (one of the other islands in the St Kilda archipelago), and the Hebridean sheep, which was formerly called the "St Kilda sheep", although the sheep it was derived from were probably not in fact from St Kilda itself.

== History ==
Until the late eighteenth century, the domesticated sheep throughout the Scottish Highlands and Islands belonged to a type called the Scottish Dunface or Old Scottish Shortwool, which was probably similar to the sheep kept in the whole of northern and western Europe up to the Iron Age. A local variety of Dunface was kept on the two main St Kilda islands of Boreray and Hirta by the crofters of the islands, who lived on Hirta, the largest island of the archipelago. Modern breeds descended from the Dunface include the Boreray and also the North Ronaldsay and the Shetland.

In the mid-eighteenth century the crofters' sheep were described as being "of the smallest kind", with short, coarse wool, and all having horns – usually one pair, but often two pairs. At that time there were about a thousand of these sheep on Hirta and about four hundred on Boreray.

In the late nineteenth century the crofters' sheep were cross-bred with Scottish Blackface sheep, which by then had replaced the Dunface throughout mainland Scotland.

Before the evacuation of the St Kildian inhabitants, these sheep were farmed. However, when the St Kilda archipelago's human inhabitants were evacuated in 1930, the sheep of Hirta were also removed and in 1932 they were replaced by Soays, which still live there as well as on Soay itself. Meanwhile, the remaining sheep on Boreray were left to become feral; these became the only survivors of the crofters' sheep, and one of the few surviving descendants of the Dunface. This means that they are the original, unmodified sheep that used to be farmed on the island. Six of the sheep were taken in the 1970s to mainland Scotland to form the nucleus of a second breeding population; the number there remains low.

== Characteristics ==
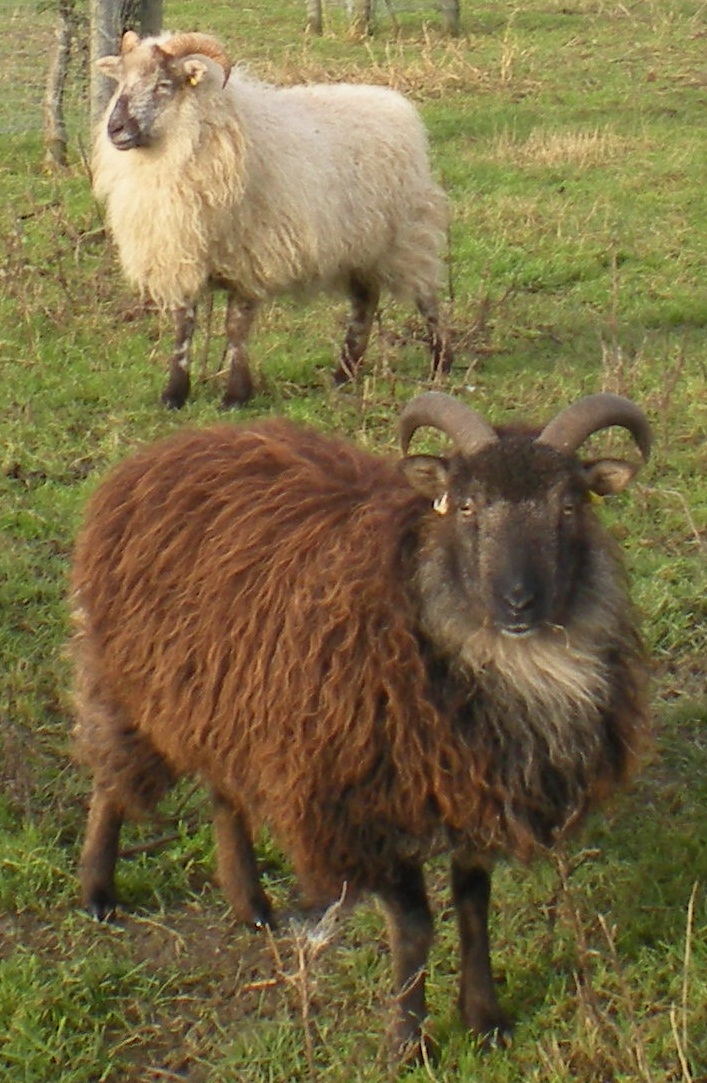
Two ewes, one with the less common darker colouring

Despite being partially derived from a long-tailed breed (the Scottish Blackface), Borerays display characteristics which group them with other northern European short-tailed sheep. They are amongst the smallest sheep, with mature ewes weighing 28 kg (62 lb) and standing 55 cm (22 in) at the withers.

They have naturally short tails, which do not require docking. They also moult their fleece naturally, rather than having to be shorn annually, though older individuals do not moult as easily and may require additional shearing. Fleeces are grey or creamy white on the body, though darker individuals occur whose colouring is similar to the Soay sheep. Rough in quality, the wool is mostly used in the creation of tweeds or carpet yarns. A tweed is a rough-surfaced coarse cloth, typically made in Scotland. Its colour is a mix of flecked colours. The face and legs are wool-free and black and white, with the proportions varying between individuals.

Both sexes of the Boreray display horns, formerly sometimes more than one pair, but in the modern breed always only one pair. The horns on the ewes tend to be thinner than those on the males and while they curve they do not spiral beyond 360 degrees. Mature rams can grow large, spiral horns which may be used for crafts such as making shepherd's crooks.

=== Population ===
In 1999 the population was estimated to be at fewer than 84, with 74 ewes. In 2002, there were between 92 and 100 animals, with 92 ewes and the male population estimated to be fewer than 7. In 2012, 204 ewes were registered in herdbooks. Since 2012, sheep numbers have been increasing year on year; and in 2017 the Rare Breeds Survival Trust (RBST) moved the classification of the sheep from 'Category 2: Critical' to 'Category 3: Vulnerable' as the number of breeding ewes was estimated to exceed 500. This data was collected from the herdbooks produced by breed societies, listing all registered sheep, and multiplying the number of registered sheep to account for non-registered sheep.

However, in 2017 the Food and Agriculture Organization of the United Nations estimated that there were 426 breeding ewes.

== Use ==
The breed was primarily reared for meat and wool, but due to its rarity it is now reared for conservation purposes, if reared at all, as most of the population is thought to be feral.

Due to the native conditions of where it developed, the Boreray is very well suited to conservation grazing, which is grazing that uses livestock to improve biodiversity and achieve nature conservation in a given area. However, the Rare Breeds Survival Trust believe that this could be further capitalised on if the breed is developed further.

== See also ==
- Fauna of Scotland
