= Scottish Dunface =

Extinct breed of sheep

- Country of origin: Scotland
- Face colour: brown

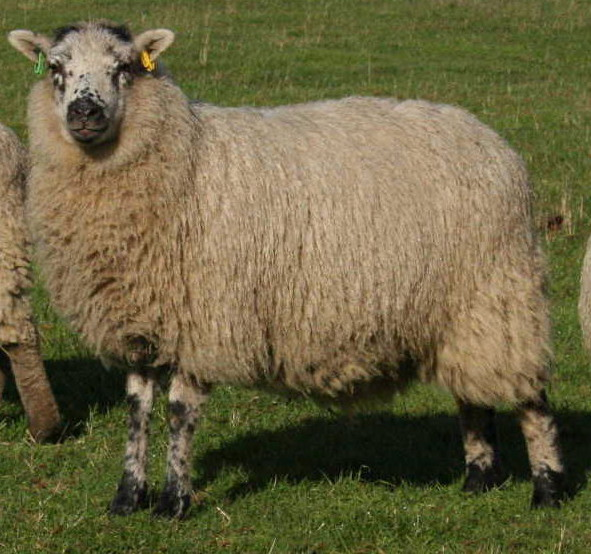
Shetland–Hebridean hybrid sheep. It may resemble the Dunface, the probable ancestor of both parent breeds.

The Scottish Dunface, Old Scottish Short-wool, Scottish Whiteface or Scottish Tanface was a type of sheep from Scotland. It was one of the Northern European short-tailed sheep group, and it was probably similar to the sheep kept throughout the British Isles in the Iron Age. By the mid-nineteenth century it had mostly been displaced by the Scottish Blackface and it became extinct on the mainland of Scotland in the late nineteenth century. However, several local types of Dunface survived on islands around Scotland, giving rise to or contributing to existing breeds including the Shetland, North Ronaldsay, Hebridean and Boreray.

== Characteristics ==
The Scottish Dunface was a short-tailed sheep with short, fine wool. Its face was often brownish, and its fleece could be various colours: white, black, brown or dun. In most varieties the ewes were polled and the males horned, but in Hebridean populations all animals were horned, often having two or even more pairs.

== History ==
The sheep kept throughout the British Isles up to the Iron Age were small, variable in colour and short-tailed. From Roman times onwards these were progressively displaced in Britain, first by white-faced sheep with longer tails, and later by long-tailed, black-faced, horned sheep.

The short-tailed Iron Age sheep survived in the Scottish Highlands and Islands as the Dunface, and by the latter part of the 18th century this was still the only type of sheep found in that area. However, over the following century the Dunface continued to be displaced by long-tailed sheep: the Scottish Blackface and the Cheviot. The last flock of Dunface sheep on the mainland of Scotland is believed to have died out near Inverness about 1880. After this the descendants of the Dunface survived only on remote islands (St Kilda, Shetland and Orkney) and as ornamental animals in parks.

Dunface sheep gave rise to or contributed to several modern breeds:

- The Dunface sheep kept as domestic livestock in the St Kilda archipelago were mixed to some extent with Scottish Blackface sheep in the late 19th century, and survive as the Boreray (the other sheep of St Kilda is the feral Soay, which is a survivor of an even earlier short-tailed type of sheep and is not derived from the Dunface).
- Multi-horned Dunface sheep elsewhere in the Hebrides survived longest on the island of North Uist, and these were probably the basis of the breed which became known as the "St Kilda" sheep, now generally called the Hebridean sheep. By the early 20th century this was extinct in the Hebrides, but it survived in parks in England and mainland Scotland.
- The North Ronaldsay, a remnant of the Dunface sheep of Orkney.
- The Shetland sheep.
- The Castlemilk Moorit, another ornamental type derived partly from Shetland sheep.

The Dunface was similar in origin and appearance to several other short-tailed sheep of the British Isles. These include the Manx Loaghtan of the Isle of Man, and the extinct Kerry Mountain and Cladagh of western Ireland.

== Husbandry ==
Dunface sheep were kept in small flocks, tended during the day by a boy or girl, then housed at night. Fine fleeces were valued.
