= Hebrides (disambiguation) =

The Hebrides are an archipelago of islands off the western coast of Scotland. These islands include two main groups:

- The Inner Hebrides
- The Outer Hebrides

Hebrides or Hebridean may also refer to:

- Hebridean (sheep), a breed of sheep
- Hebrides Overture, a concert overture by Felix Mendelssohn
- New Hebrides, the former colonial name of Vanuatu

== See also ==
- Sea of the Hebrides, portion of the North Atlantic Ocean located off the coast of western Scotland
