= Ronaldsay =

Two of the Orkney Islands in the British Isles are named Ronaldsay:

- North Ronaldsay, the northernmost of the Orkney Islands
- South Ronaldsay, the southernmost of the Orkney Islands

See also

- Ronaldsway, on the Isle of Man
- North Ronaldsay sheep, a breed of short-tailed sheep
