= Soay sheep =

Scottish breed of sheep

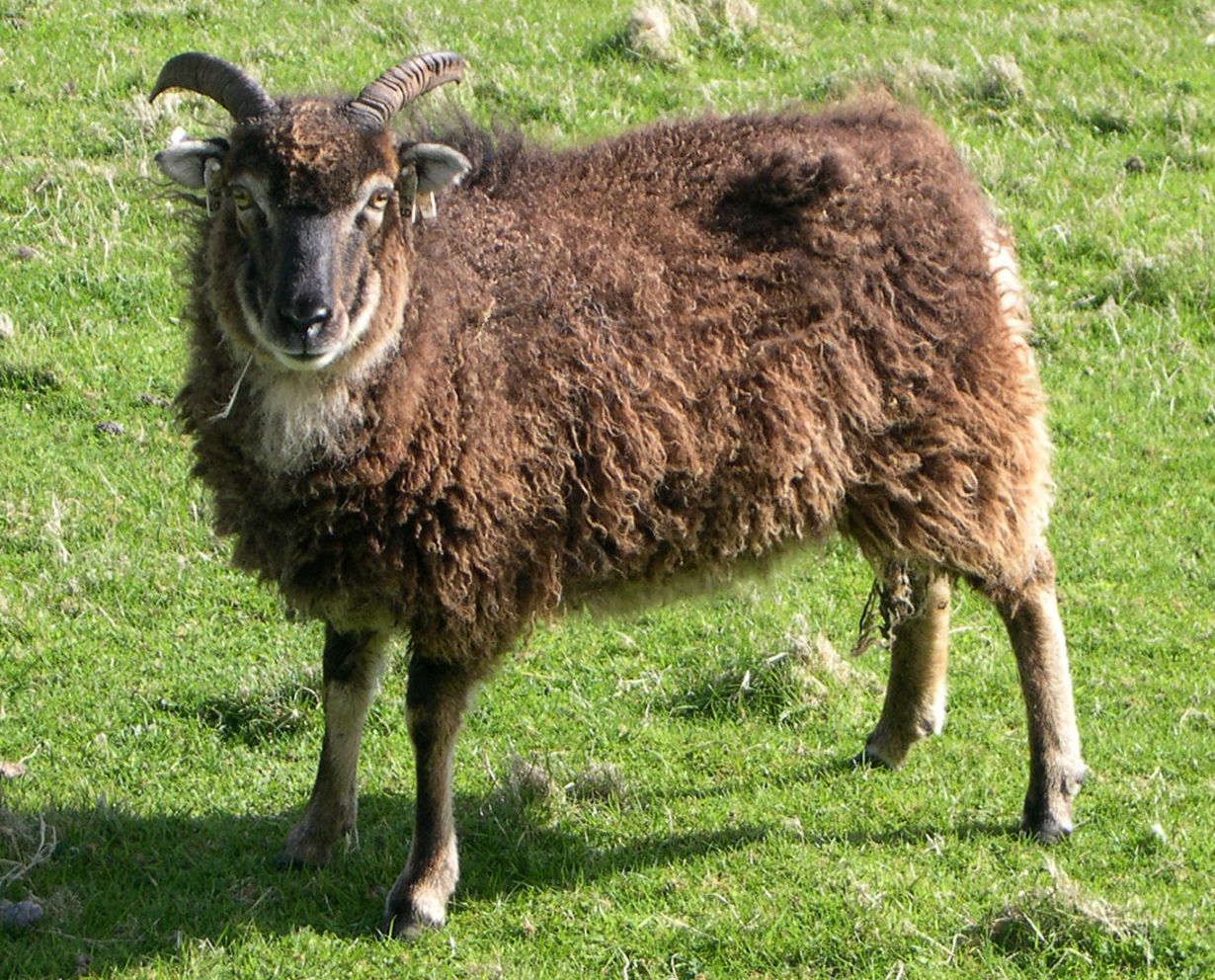
- Soay ewe
- Conservation status: RBST (2017): Category 4
- Country of origin: Scotland

Traits
- Wool colour: Black, brown, blonde or dark brown with buffish-white underbelly and rump
- Horn status: Horned

The Soay sheep is a breed of domestic sheep (Ovis aries) descended from a population of feral sheep on the 100-hectare (250-acre) island of Soay in the St Kilda Archipelago, about 65 kilometres (40 mi) from the Western Isles of Scotland. It is one of the Northern European short-tailed sheep breeds.

It remains physically similar to the wild ancestors of domestic sheep, the Mediterranean mouflon and the horned urial sheep of Central Asia. It is much smaller than modern domesticated sheep but hardier, and is extraordinarily agile, tending to take refuge amongst the cliffs when frightened. Soays may be solid black or brown, or more often blonde or dark brown with buffish-white underbelly and rump (known as lachdann in Scottish Gaelic, which is cognate to the Manx loaghtan); a few have white markings on the face.

In the early twentieth century, some Soay sheep were relocated to establish exotic flocks, such as the flock of "Park Soay" at Woburn Abbey, established by the Duke of Bedford in 1910, and selected for "primitive" characteristics. A number of Soay sheep were translocated from Soay to another of the St Kilda group, the island of Hirta by the Marquess of Bute in the 1930s, after the human population and their sheep were evacuated. The name of the island is from Old Norse Seyðoy, meaning "Island of Sheep". The breed was introduced to and live wild on Holy Isle off Arran.

Soay sheep were introduced from St Kilda to Lundy, an island in the Bristol Channel, by Martin Coles Harman soon after he purchased the island in 1925. There is also a small population living wild in and around the Cheddar Gorge in Somerset. The breed was used in experimental archaeology at Butser Ancient Farm because it closely resembles British prehistoric breeds.

The Soays are particularly hardy and have been allowed to become largely feral. The breed is listed in "Category 4: At Risk" by the Rare Breeds Survival Trust, because there are only between 900 and 1500 registered breeding Soay ewes. The Soay is distinct from two other short-tailed breeds also associated with St Kilda: the Boreray (from Boreray, another of the islands, and formerly also living on Hirta), and the "St Kilda", a former name for the Hebridean sheep (which is probably not from St Kilda at all).

== Scientific study ==
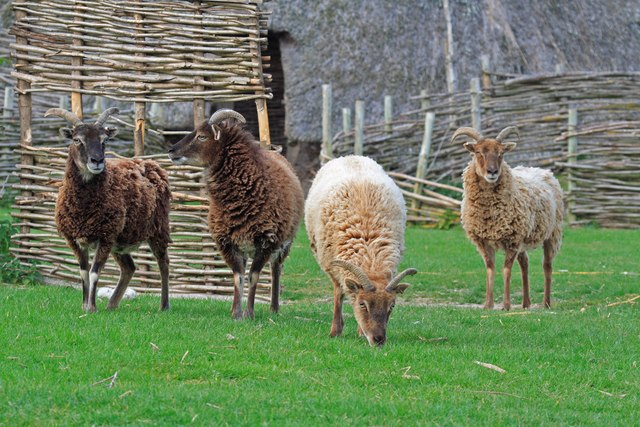
Soay sheep of varied colours

The Hirta population is unmanaged and has been the subject of scientific study since the 1950s. It is more appropriate as a basis for scientific research than the population on the adjacent island of Soay, due to the difficulty of accessing the island of Soay. The population has been studied in detail since 1985. Scientific study of the St Kilda Soay sheep began from the University of Cambridge, but is now managed from the University of Edinburgh, with many collaborating institutions and thanks to the assistance of many volunteers as well as full-time academic staff.

The population makes an ideal model subject for scientists researching evolution, population dynamics and demography because the population is unmanaged, is closed (no emigration or immigration) and has no significant competitors or predators. This has resulted in continuous data collection by researchers visiting the island of Hirta every year from 1985 onwards. Data collection reflects a focus on the identification and life of individual animals.

The sheep exhibit a phenomenon known as overcompensatory density dependence, in which their population never reaches equilibrium. The population growth is so great as to exceed the carrying capacity of the island, which eventually causes a dramatic population crash, and then the cycle repeats. For example, in 1989, the population fell by two-thirds within 12 weeks.

The age and sex structure of the population are important in determining when a crash happens; for instance, adult males enter winter in a poor condition after the autumn rut, whereas females have been grazing all summer and so enter winter in a good condition. Survival rates of males (and lambs) are influenced by weather throughout winter (dependent on the strength of the North Atlantic Oscillation), whereas survival rates of females (and adolescents) are influenced most strongly by rainfall at the end of winter, when they will normally be heavily pregnant (the rain soaks the wool, increasing energy expenditure).

Another factor in mortality rates is the loading of intestinal nematode parasites, particularly damaging in malnourished hosts.

The breed is becoming smaller because of the change in climate.

== Breed characteristics ==
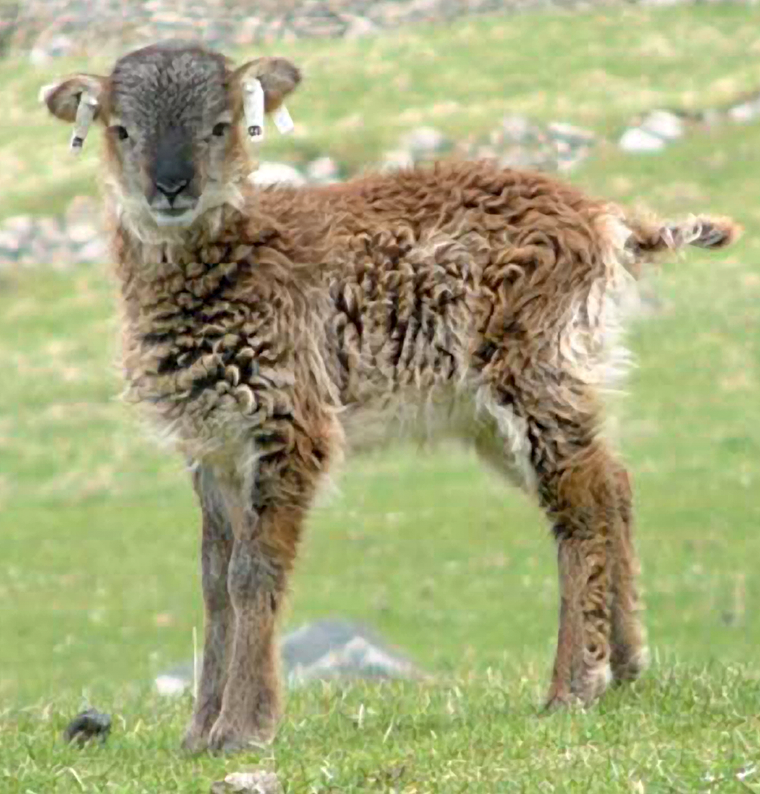
A Soay lamb

The sheep have short tails and naturally shed their wool, which can be hand plucked (called rooing) in the spring and early summer. About one kilogram of wool can be obtained from each animal per year. Ewes are polled, scurred or horned and rams are either horned or scurred. They are most commonly brown or tan with a white belly, white rump patch and/or white patch under the chin (referred to as the Mouflon or wild pattern). Occasionally white markings on the face and/or body and legs occur. Rarely self-coloured (solid colour with no markings) black or tan individuals are seen.

This breed has extremely fine fleece and, in contrast to mouflon, the inner fleece is highly developed and it is difficult to distinguish an outer coat. This is a clear indication that the Soay are indeed the product of a domesticated breed in prehistoric times. The breed also lacks the flocking instinct of many breeds. Attempts to work them using sheep dogs result in a scattering of the group.

The lambs are late maturing and produce smaller carcasses relative to commercial breeds. The meat from the Soay is lean, tender and low in cholesterol. It has a stronger flavour with a gamey taste when compared to more common sheep breeds. Crossing with larger breeds, such as the Suffolk or Mule, can produce larger carcasses which will be lean and still retain much of the flavour.

The Soay is very similar to another feral type from the island of Lítla Dímun in the Faroe Islands, Lítla Dímun sheep, which became extinct in the mid-nineteenth century, partially due to overhunting.
