= Hebridean sheep =

Scottish breed of sheep

Hebridean Sheep
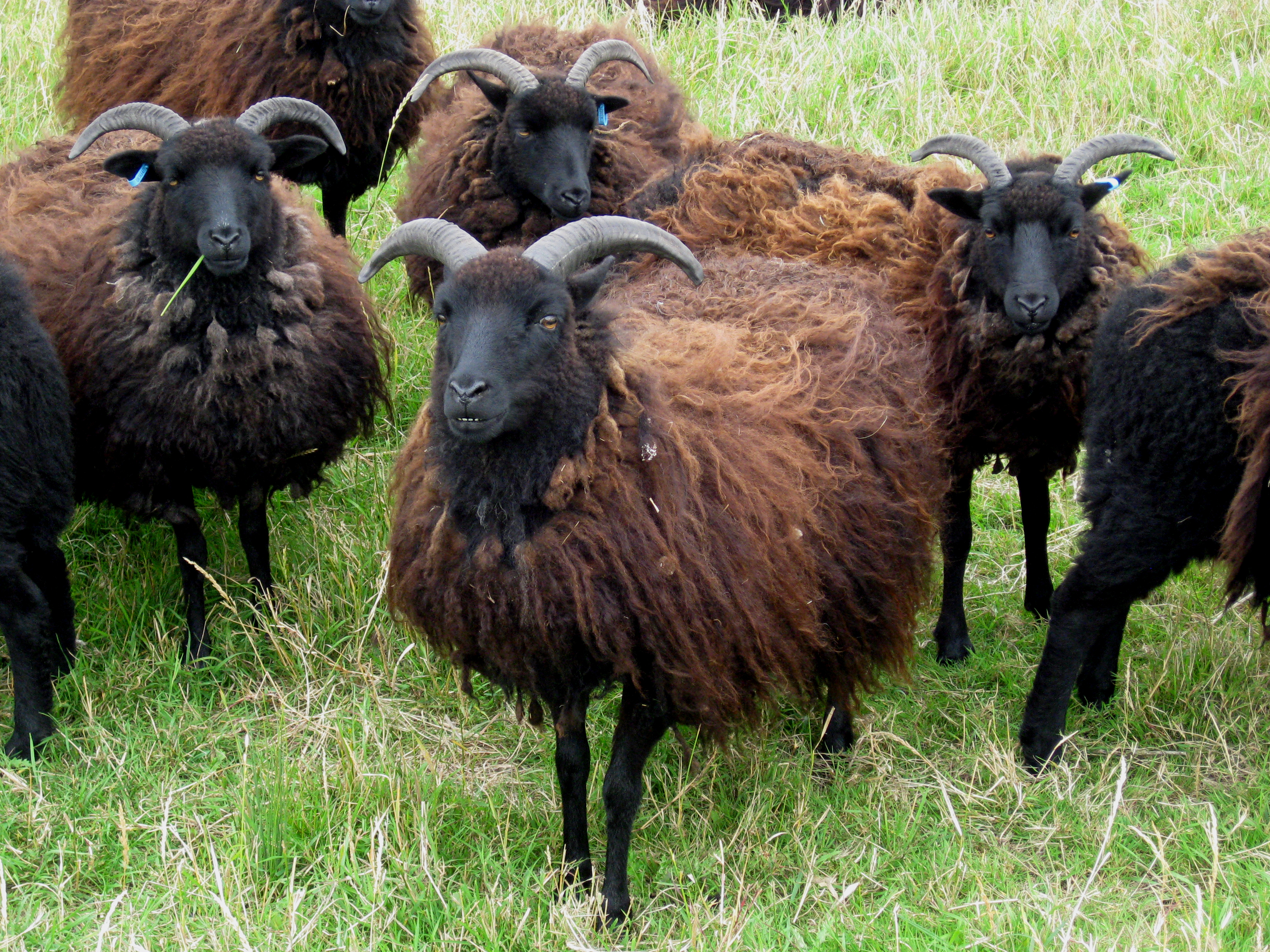
- Conservation status: FAO (2007): not at risk; RBST (2017): Category 6
- Country of origin: Scotland

Traits
- Wool colour: black, brown
- Face colour: black
- Horn status: horned, sometimes polycerate

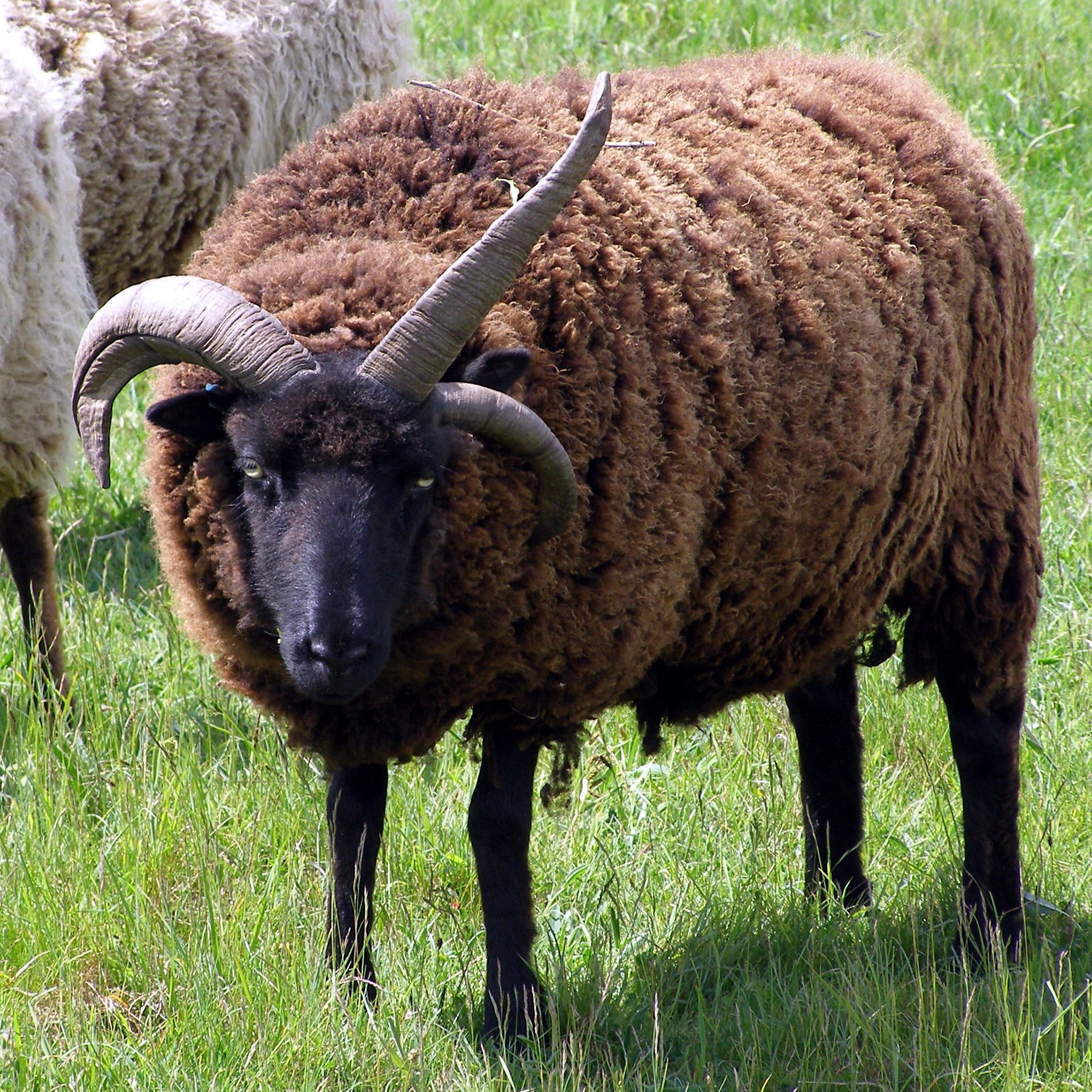
Three-horned Hebridean sheep

The Hebridean is a breed of small black sheep from Scotland, similar to other members of the Northern European short-tailed sheep group, having a short, triangular tail. They often have two pairs of horns. They were formerly known as "St Kilda" sheep, because they were exported from the St Kilda archipelago in the 19th century to serve as parkland livestock.

== Characteristics ==
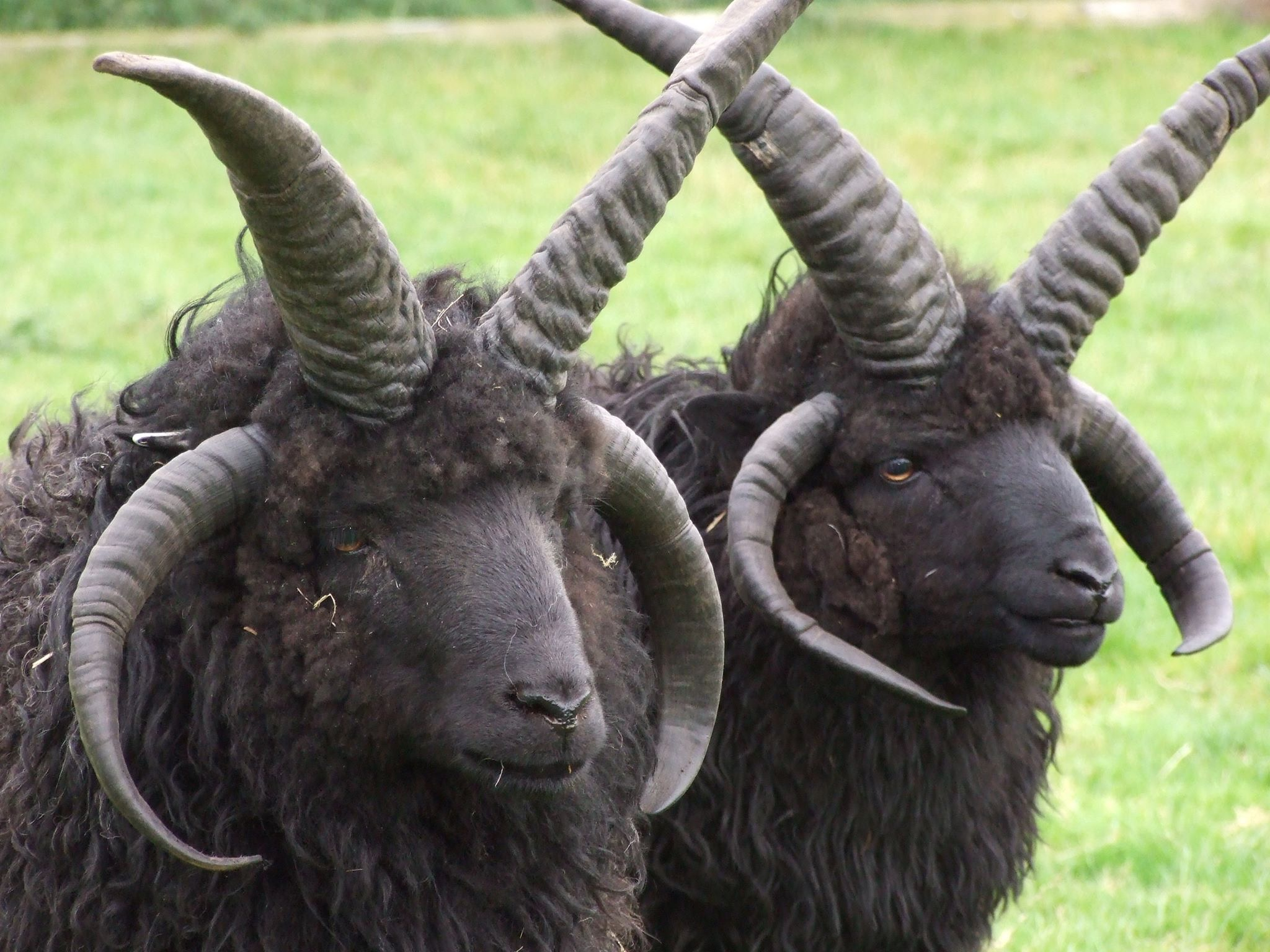

Modern Hebrideans have black, rather coarse wool, which fades to brown in the sun and often becomes grey with age; there is no wool on the face or legs. If not shorn the wool may moult naturally in spring. Rams and ewes typically have one pair of horns, but often have two or even more pairs (polycerate), and occasionally none. They are considerably smaller than most other breeds of sheep, fully grown ewes weighing only around 40 kg (88 lb), and rams slightly heavier, at around 50 to 60 kg (110 to 130 lb). Hebrideans are hardy and able to thrive on rough grazing, and so are often used as conservation grazing animals to maintain natural grassland or heathland habitats. They are particularly effective at scrub control, having a strong preference for browsing.

== History ==
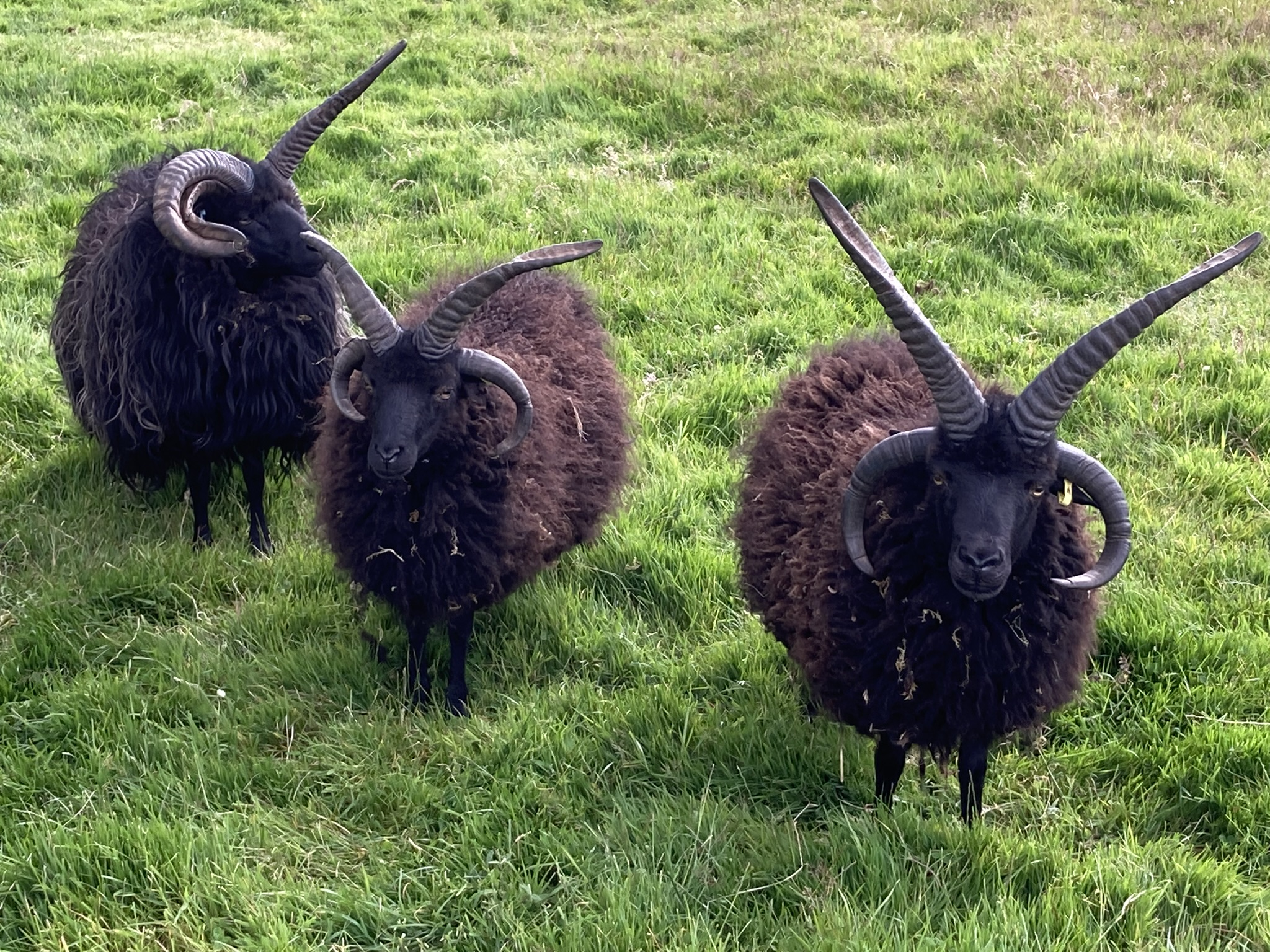
A group of three Hebridean sheep rams from the Weatherwax Flock

The sheep kept throughout Britain up to the Iron Age were small, short-tailed, and varied in colour. These survived into the 19th century in the Highlands and Islands as the Scottish Dunface, which had various local varieties, most of which are now extinct (some do survive, such as the Shetland and North Ronaldsay). The Dunfaces kept in the Hebrides were very small, with white faces and legs; their bodies were usually white, but often black, brown, russet or grey. The fleece was short and soft and they were typically horned in both sexes, many of them having two or even three pairs of horns. The Dunface was gradually replaced with long-tailed breeds such as the Scottish Blackface and Cheviot; it died out on the mainland and eventually also on the Hebridean islands.

The ancestors of Hebridean sheep were exported from St Kilda and were known as 'St Kildas' in the 19th century, being kept in the parks of wealthy and aristocratic landowners in Britain. Early owners included the Marquess of Breadalbane of Taymouth Castle in the 1840s and 1850s, Sir John Orde at Kilmory (Argyllshire) and Mark Milbank at Thorp Perrow (North Yorkshire) from the 1850s. They were successfully bred to black, though some 19th century St Kildas were more variegated. In 1906 John Guille Millais renamed these sheep "Hebrideans", asserting that they were "a deteriorated variety of the Hebridean sheep"; his classification thus lumped them with sheep known as Hebrideans which were kept by a very small number of owners in the late 19th century. In 1912, Lydekker claimed that St Kildas were "of uncertain and mixed origin"; scepticism and denial about their St Kilda origins has continued ever since. Four of the 19th century St Kilda flocks survive, at Weston Park (Staffordshire), Tatton Park (Cheshire), Harewood House and Kirk Hammerton (North Yorkshire).

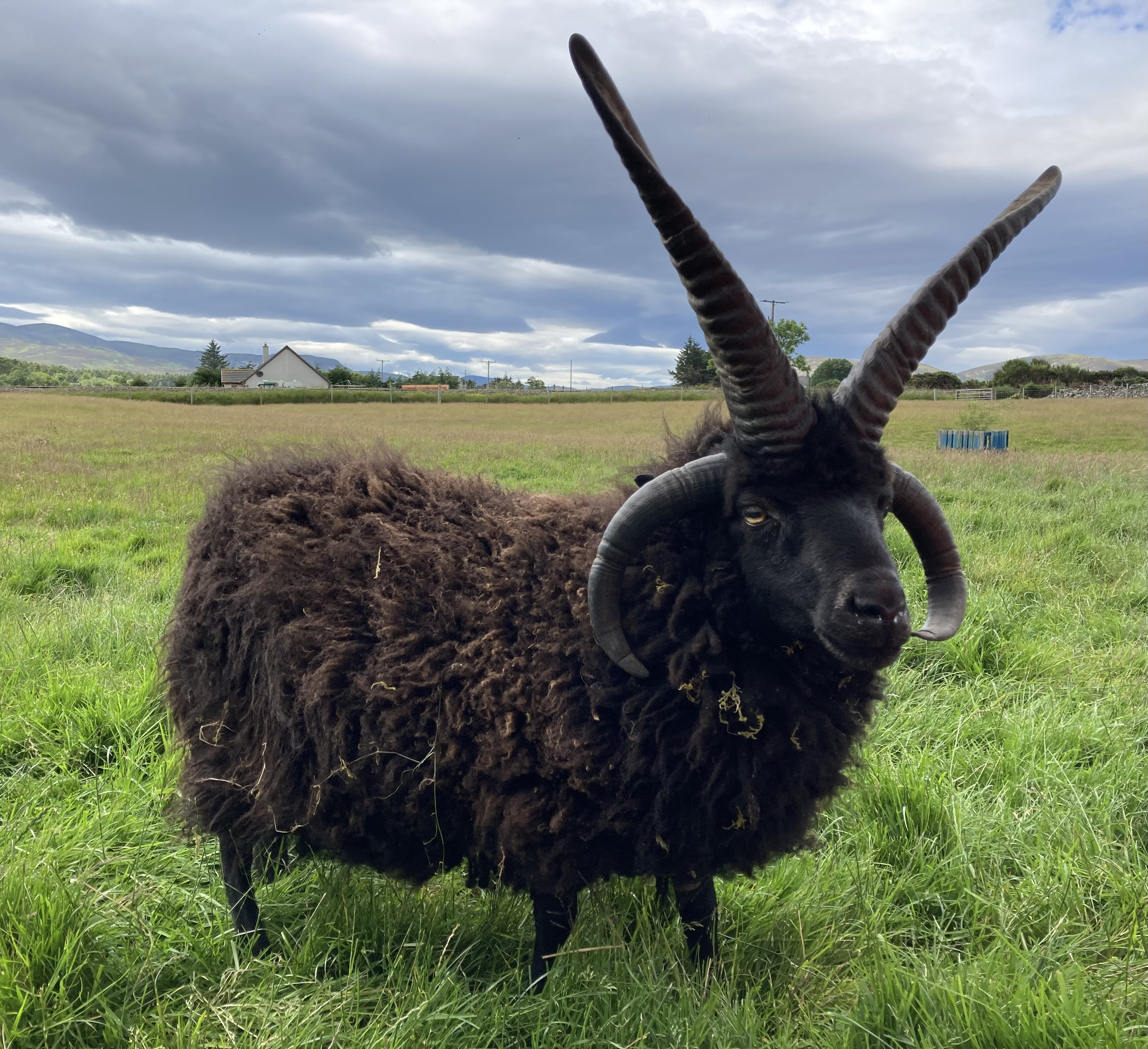
A Hebridean tup from the Weatherwax Flock

In 1973 the ornamental Hebrideans were identified by the Rare Breeds Survival Trust as being in need of conservation. Since then the breed has been revived, and it is no longer regarded as rare; it is now kept in many parts of the world, including its native Hebrides.

== See also ==
- Icelandic sheep
- Jacob sheep
- Manx Loaghtan
- Rare breed (agriculture)
