= Ouessant sheep =

Breed of sheep

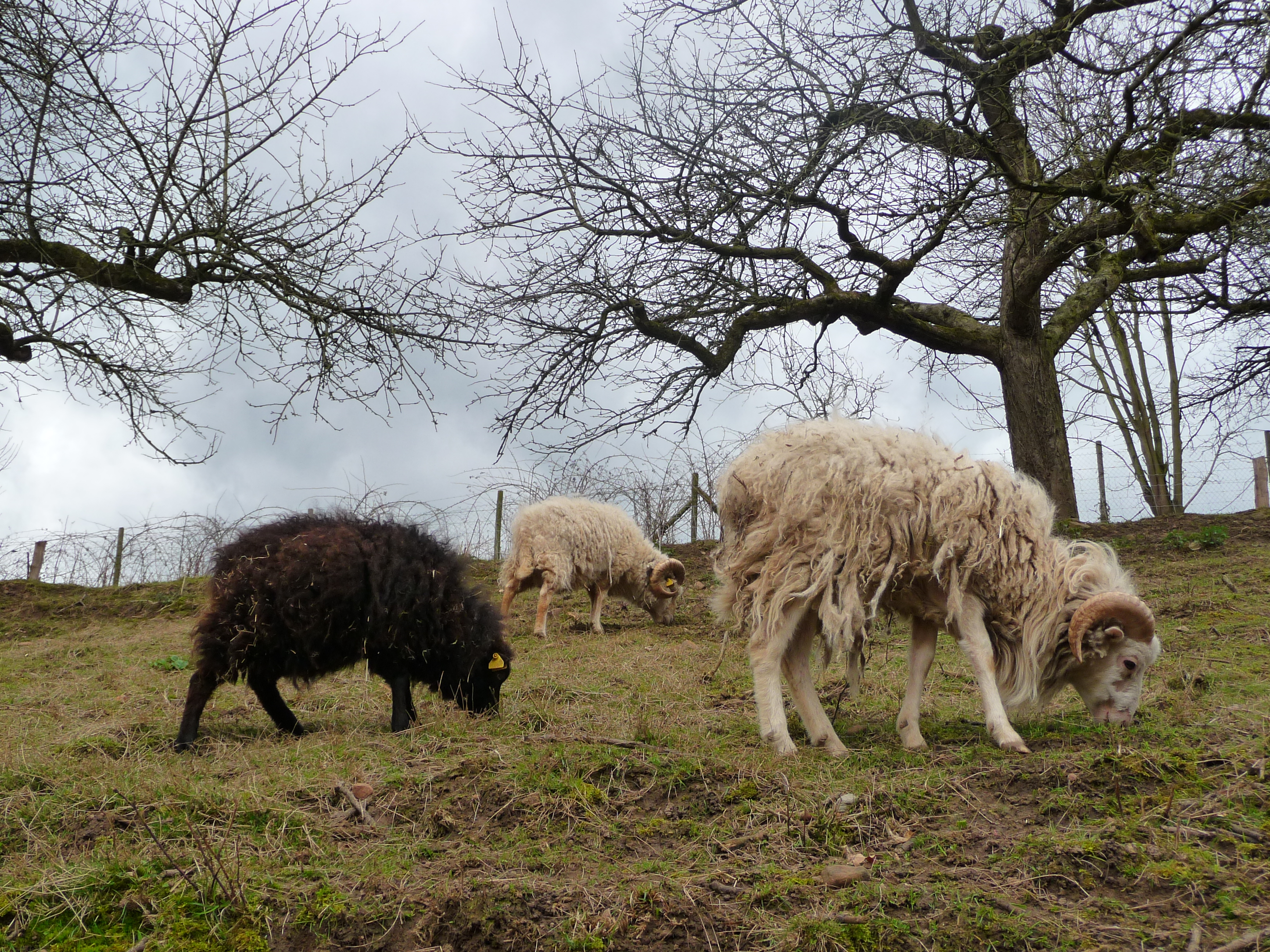
Ouessants in Germany

The Ouessant (Breton: Eusa, English: Ushant) is a primitive, heritage breed of sheep originating from the island of Ouessant which is situated off the coast of Brittany. It has a naturally short tail and therefore categorised as a Northern European short-tailed sheep breed together with several other breeds originating from the UK, Scandinavia and Germany. Also occasionally called the Breton Dwarf, it is reputed to be the smallest naturally occurring breed of sheep in the world. Rams are around 49 centimetres (19 in) tall at the shoulder, and the ewes about 45 centimetres (18 in). The Ouessant existed exclusively on its home island until the beginning of the 20th century, and though no longer to be found there, they are widespread throughout Europe, with Ouessant breed societies in France, Germany, the Netherlands, Belgium, Italy, Switzerland and the UK. The breed is also gaining in popularity in the US and NZ.

Ouessant are a solid black, white or brown (moorit) colour. The rams have two relatively large horns, and ewes are polled. Ewes characteristically are single lambing and the breed is primarily used for wool production. In Paris, the city government recently began using a small herd of Ouessant sheep to graze public lands. They are also used to graze vineyards and orchards.
