= North European short-tailed sheep =

Group of sheep breeds

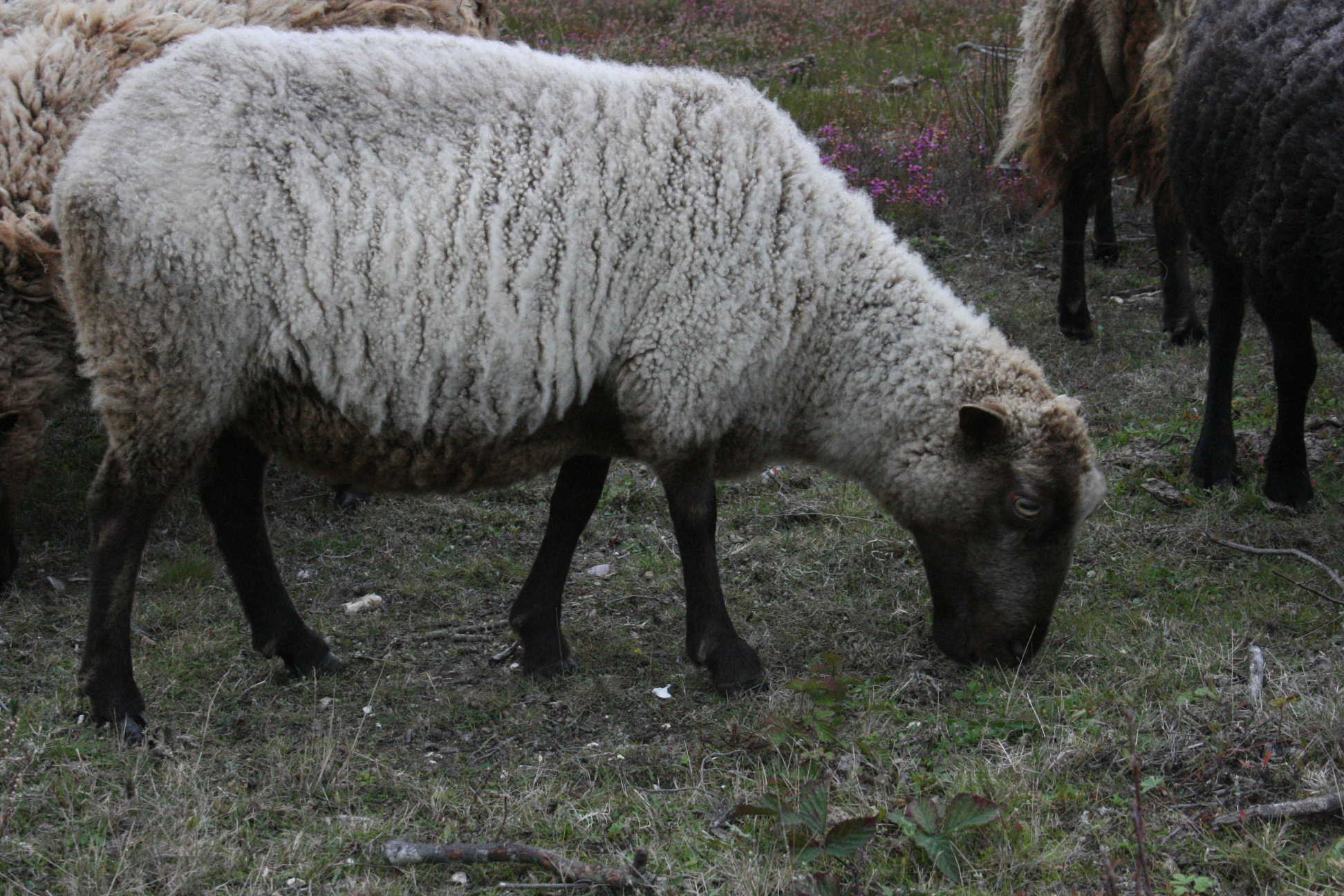
Shetland ewe

The North European short-tailed sheep are a group of traditional sheep breeds or types found in Northern Europe, characterised by a short and usually fluke-shaped tail. They are distributed mainly in the British Isles, Scandinavia, Iceland, Greenland, and the area around the Baltic. They are thought to be derived from the first sheep brought to Europe by early farmers. They are hardy sheep, adapted to harsh environments, but they are small and have been replaced in most areas with later types of larger, long-tailed sheep.

== History ==
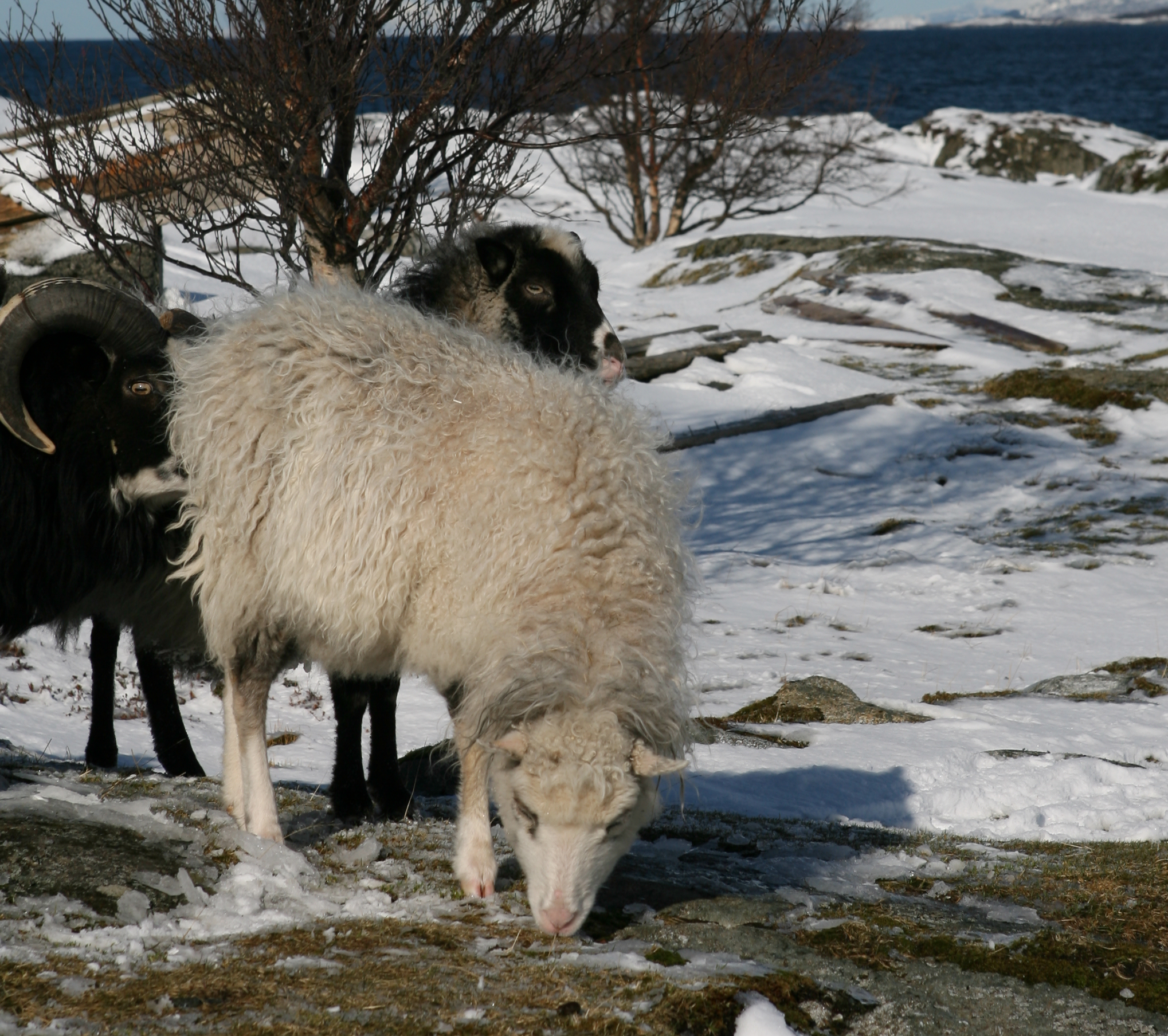
Old Norwegian Sheep on the coast of Norway

The first sheep brought to Europe by the earliest farmers are thought to have been short-tailed sheep. Initially, in the Neolithic Age, these were small, double-coated, naturally moulting, brown sheep, of which the Soay sheep is believed to be a relict. By the Iron Age, these had been replaced throughout northern and western Europe by somewhat larger sheep, still short-tailed, but with a fleece of more uniform texture and variable in colour.

Sheep brought later from southern Europe were long-tailed, white-fleeced and larger. These displaced the short-tailed sheep in most areas, and by the early nineteenth century, short-tailed sheep remained only in remoter parts of the west and north, including Scandinavia, the area around the Baltic, Ireland, Cornwall, the Highlands of Scotland, and various islands. Long-tailed sheep then spread into most of these areas too, and by the early twentieth century short-tailed sheep were restricted to very remote islands and mountains.

From the mid-nineteenth century (and especially after the middle of the twentieth century), many of the surviving short-tailed breeds became recognised as worthy of preservation for curiosity, for cultural reasons, as ornamental animals, or for conservation of genetic diversity.

== Characteristics ==
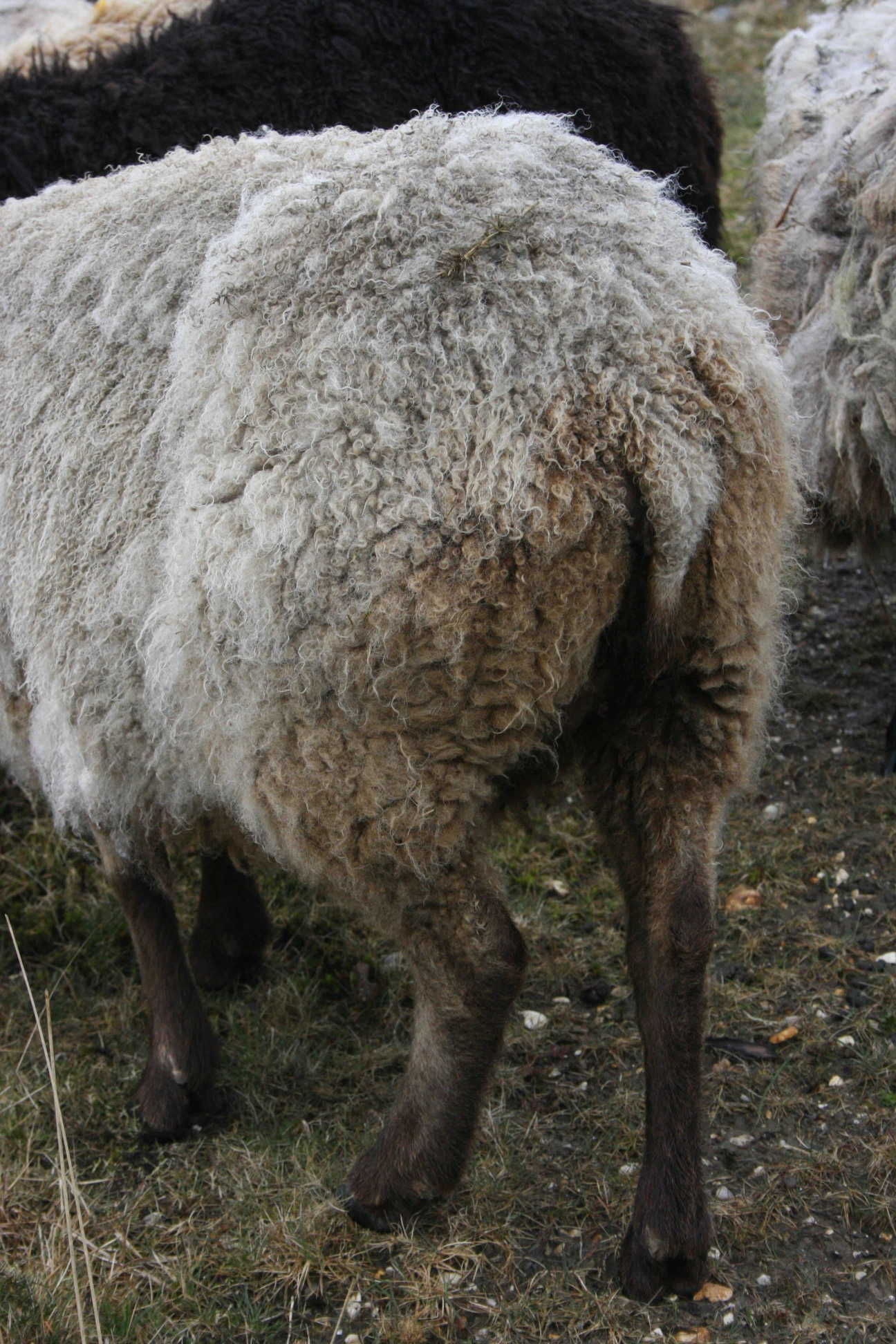
Shetland ewe showing the characteristic short, hair-tipped tail

These sheep are generally small and have characteristic short fluke-shaped tails, broad at the base and tapering to a hair-covered tip. The tail usually has 13 vertebrae, compared with over 20 for other sheep; in most types the individual tail vertebrae are also shorter than those of long-tailed sheep. Their faces and legs are free of wool. The horns vary between breeds and often within them: they may be horned in both sexes, horned only in the male or polled in both sexes. Some types (such as Manx Loaghtan and Hebridean) can have more than one pair of horns.

They may be patterned or solid-coloured (commonly white, black or moorit – brown), and white markings may also occur over other colouration. Some (such as Shetland and Icelandic) include a very wide range of colours and patterns. Some types moult naturally in spring, allowing their fleece to be rooed (plucked) rather than shorn. Twin births are frequent, with some (such as the Finnsheep, Romanov and Icelandic) often giving birth to litters of three, four or even more lambs. Breeding is usually strongly seasonal, with lambs being born in spring or early summer.

Most types are very hardy and agile, being well adapted to eating rough vegetation in wet and cool climates, and they often have a strong preference for browsing trees and shrubs rather than grazing shorter vegetation. The North Ronaldsay is adapted to living largely on seaweed.

== Breeds ==
While some have become extinct, more than thirty of these breeds survive. They include:

- the Åland or Ålandsfår – From Åland, an archipelago forming part of Finland; originally brought from Gotland. Horned or not in both sexes, various colours including white and grey. Very rare.
- the Boreray – Survivors of the sheep kept by the crofters of the St Kilda archipelago off the west coast of Scotland, now living only on the island of Boreray but formerly also kept on the larger island of Hirta. Horned in both sexes (formerly often two pairs of horns), usually creamy white with dark face and legs, but may also be dark all over. Descended from earlier short-tailed Hebridean sheep, crossed with Scottish Blackface.
- the Castlemilk Moorit – From the Castlemilk estate in Dumfriesshire in Scotland. Horned in both sexes, moorit (reddish brown). Bred as ornamental parkland animals from Manx Loaghtan, Shetland and wild Mouflon.
- the Dala Pälsfår – From Sweden, one of the Swedish Landrace group of breeds. Males mostly horned, females polled. Usually white. Very rare.
- the Estonian Ruhnu – From the Estonian island of Ruhnu. Some males horned, white or cream with grey head; some individuals have one or two wattles beneath the head; tail short or medium-length.
- the Faeroe Sheep or Føroyskur seyður – From the Faroe Islands ("Sheep Islands"). Similar to Icelandic sheep: usually horned in males, many different colours and patterns.
- the Finnsheep – From Finland. Horned in males only, usually white in North America, other colours in Finland. Multiple births frequent (up to seven or even nine live lambs).
- the Gestrike Sheep or Gestrikefår
- the Gotland – From the island of Gotland, a Swedish island in the Baltic. Polled in both sexes, usually grey. Descended from the horned Gute sheep, also from Gotland.
- the Greenland – From Greenland. Mostly horned, but may be polled in either sex. Descended mainly from Icelandic and Faroes sheep transported to Greenland in the early twentieth century.
- the Grey of Kainuu Sheep or Kainuun harmaslammas
- the Gute or Gutefår – From Gotland, one of the Swedish Landrace group of breeds. Horned in males, and often in females. Many colours and patterns.
- the Hebridean or St Kilda – Derived from remnants of sheep of Scottish Dunface type from the Hebrides archipelago off the west coast (but not necessarily St Kilda itself). Established as an ornamental animal in northern England in the late nineteenth century, becoming extinct in the Hebrides. Horned in both sexes, often with two pairs of horns. Originally varied in colour, but nowadays always black, usually fading to brown in sunlight and often greying with age. May moult naturally.
- the Heidschnucke – a group of three breeds from northern Germany. Includes:
  - the German Grey Heath – Grey, horned in both sexes.
  - the White Polled Heath – White, polled in both sexes.
  - the White Horned Heath – White, horned in both sexes.
- the Helsinge Sheep or Helsingefår
- the Icelandic or Íslenska sauðkindin – From Iceland. Either horned or polled, many different colours and patterns. Multiple births common. Includes the Leader Sheep, a strain bred to lead flocks of other sheep to and from their pastures.
- the Klövsjö Sheep or Klövsjöfår
- the Manx Loaghtan – From the Isle of Man. Usually two pairs of horns in both sexes, but may have only one pair or as many as three pairs. Originally variable in colour, but now always mouse-brown (lugh dhoan in Manx).
- the North Ronaldsay – From the island of North Ronaldsay in the Orkney archipelago off the north coast of Scotland. Horned in males and often in females, many different colours. For much of the year forage mainly on seaweed, outside a wall which surrounds the island just above the high tide mark.
- the Norwegian Pelt Sheep or Norsk Pelssau
- the Norwegian Spaelsau or Moderne Spælsau
- the Old Norse Sheep or Gammelnorsk Sau, from the coastal districts of Norway. Small, horned in males and some females.
- the Old Spael Sheep or Gammelnorsk Spælsau
- the Ouessant, Mouton d'Ouessant, Ushant or Breton Dwarf – From the island of Ouessant off the coast of Brittany, France. Very small, usually black or dark brown, horned in males.
- the Polish Heath or Wrzosówka – From north-eastern Poland. Horned in males, grey.
- the Romanov or Romanovska Ovce – From the Volga Valley, northwest of Moscow in Russia. Either horned or not in both sexes. Born black, turning grey, often with white markings on head. Multiple births normal.
- the Roslag or Roslagsfår – From Roslagen, Sweden, one of the Swedish Landrace group of breeds. Usually white, horned in the males.
- the Russian Viena or Viena Ovce – From western Russia. Either horned or not in both sexes. Variable in colour, with various patterns of grey and white.
- the Rya Sheep or Ryafår
- the Shetland – from the Shetland archipelago, off the north coast of Scotland. Usually horned in males only, small. Many different colours and patterns. Very fine fleece, often moulting naturally.
- the Skudde – From Prussia and the Baltic states. Large spiral horns in males; females may be polled, or may have scurs or small horns. Fleece white, brown, black or grey.
- the Spaelsau – From Norway. Either polled or horned in both sexes. Most often white, but many other colours also occur.
- the Soay – From an ancient feral population of sheep on the island of Soay in the St Kilda archipelago off the western coast of Scotland; now also found on the nearby island of Hirta. Horned in both sexes, very small, brown with white belly (the "mouflon" pattern) or sometimes all black, sometimes with white markings on head; moults naturally.
- St Kilda – A name formerly used for sheep reputed to be from the remote Scottish archipelago of St Kilda, especially those with two pairs of horns. For types associated with St Kilda see Hebridean, Boreray and Soay.
- the Svårdsjö Sheep or Svårdsjöfår
- the Swedish Finewool or Svenskt Finullfår – has a soft, glossy, silky and fine fibrous wool. The sheep appears in the three colour variants: white, black or brown. The breed is characterized by good maternal ability, a high milk yield and high fertility.
- the Värmlandsfår – From Värmland in Sweden, one of the Swedish Landrace group of breeds. Males and some females horned. Lambs born dark, but become grey, brown or white as adults; often has white markings on head.

Extinct breeds may include:

- the Cladagh – From Ireland, now probably extinct. Survived longest in the Aran Islands and a few were still in existence in the early 1970s. Mostly polled, white-faced, mostly with white body but some of other colours.
- the Kerry Mountain or Kerry (not to be confused with the long-tailed Kerry Hill from Wales) – From the south-west of Ireland, became extinct in the early twentieth century. Horned, both white and other colours.
- the Lítla Dímun – Lived feral on the island of Lítla Dímun in the Faroe Islands, becoming extinct in the mid-nineteenth century. Similar to the Soay; perhaps derived from the earliest European sheep, very small, black, with horns in the male only. Now replaced on the island by Faroes sheep.
- the Scottish Dunface or Old Scottish Short-wool. Formerly found all over the Scottish Highlands and Islands, and probably similar to sheep kept earlier throughout the British Isles. In some areas horned in males only, in others horned in both sexes, in which case often with more than one pair, brown face, coloured streaks in short, fine wool. The Shetland, North Ronaldsay, Hebridean and Boreray probably derive from it, and perhaps other types.
