= Romanov sheep =

Breed of sheep

- Country of origin: Russia

Traits
- Weight: Male: 55-80; Female: 40-50
- Wool colour: White; black
- Face color: Black

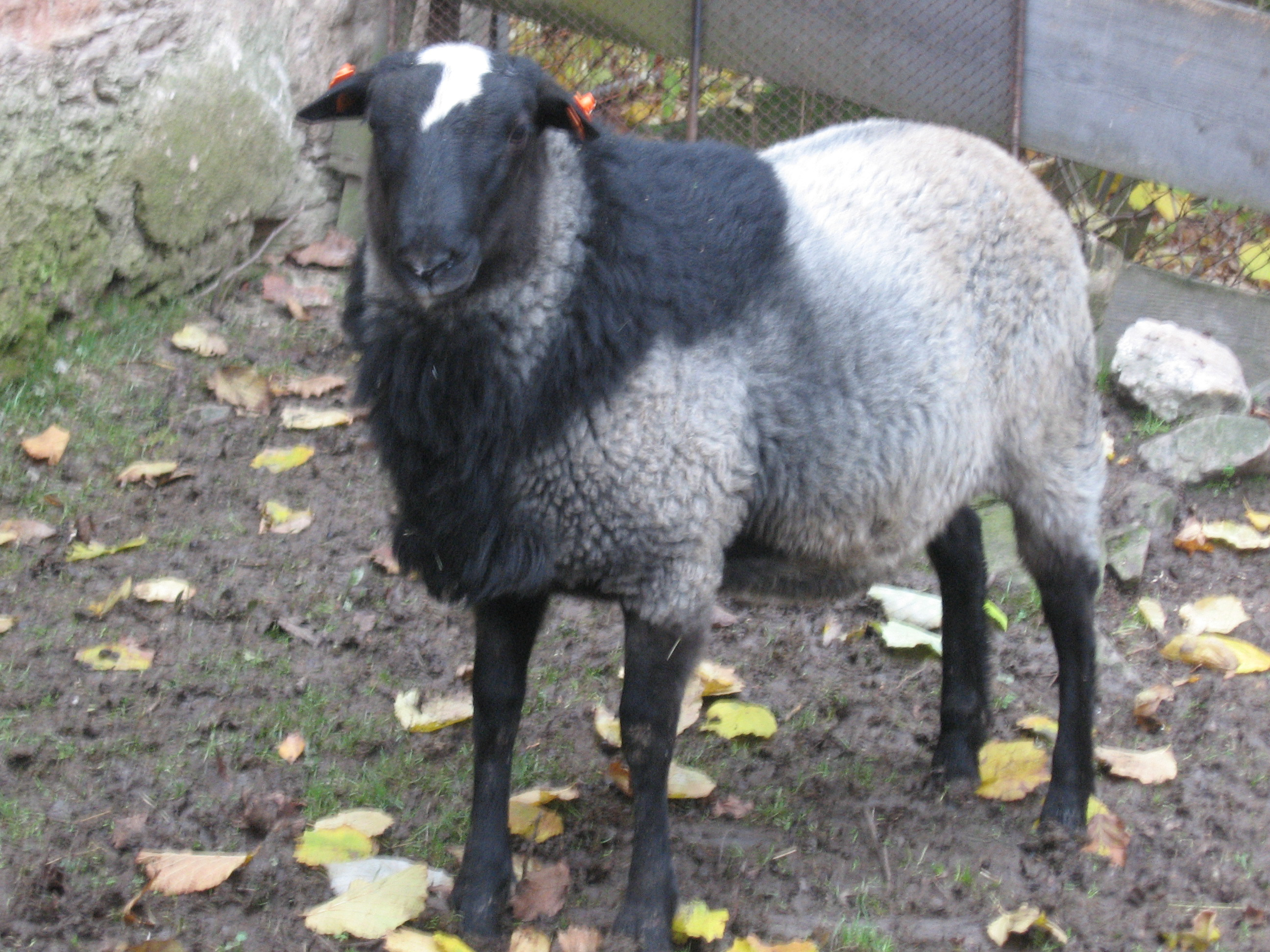
A Romanov ram

Romanov is a breed of domestic sheep originating from the Upper Volga region in Russia. These domestic sheep got the name Romanov from the town of the same name. In the 18th century, these sheep were first noticed outside of Russia. Soon after, they were imported to Germany and then to France. In 1980, 14 ewes and 4 rams were bought by the Canadian government and were quarantined for 5 years. After the testing, some of the Romanov breed was brought into the United States. The distribution of this unique breed is worldwide. This breed is raised primarily for meat.

== Appearance and condition ==
These sheep are adapted to the cold inland climate and local feeding. Romanovs are one of the Northern European short-tailed sheep breeds. They are pure black when they are born, but as they grow older the color quickly changes to gray. The average weight of a male Romanov is 55-80 kilograms and the average weight of a female is 40-50 kilograms.

== Reproduction ==
By 3–4 months old, Romanovs are sexually mature and will start breeding any month of the year. The ewe can produce quadruplets, quintuplets, and even sometimes sextuplets. Romanov ewes tend to lamb in litters, unlike other sheep who give single or twin births. British and North American breeds of domesticated sheep are genetically different because the Romanov breed is a "pure gene", not a "cross". But, they are often crossed with more popular breeds to increase their prolificacy.

== Romanov wool ==
Romanov wool is very strong and resourceful. The wool is double coated with mean diameter of wool fibers of 20.9 micrometres and 71.9 micrometres of outer-coat hair (lamb wool). Mean greasy fleece weight is around 4.5 kilograms. The wool, which is a mixture of gray wool and black guard hair, is usually used for rugs, mats, and wall hangings.
