= Castlemilk Moorit =

Breed of sheep

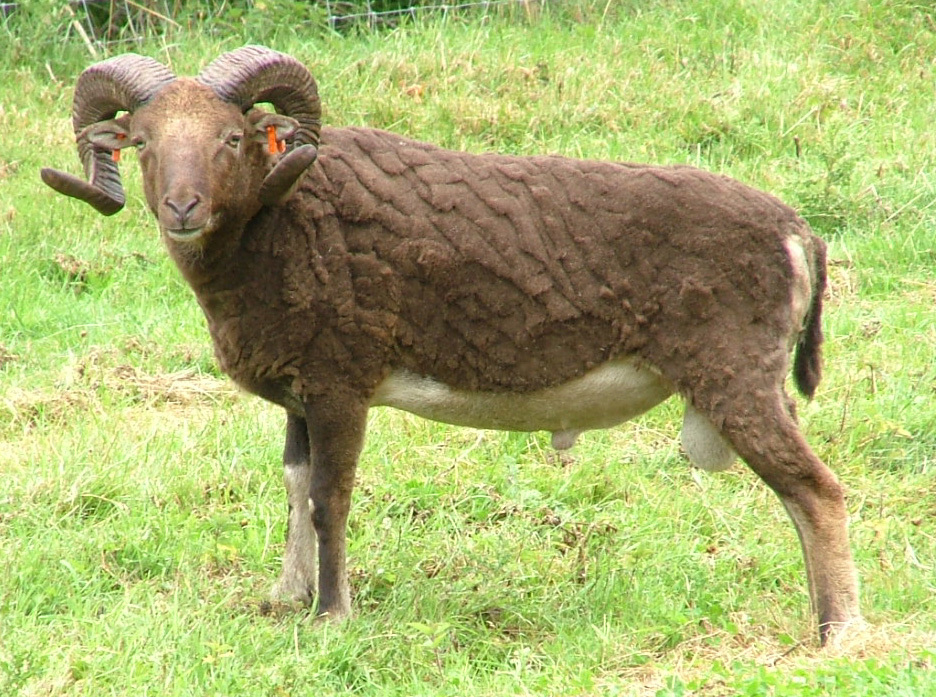
- A ram after shearing
- Conservation status: FAO (2007): Endangered; RBST (2022): At risk
- Country of origin: Scotland

Traits
- Wool colour: tan, brown, reddish-brown
- Face colour: brown
- Horn status: horned

The Castlemilk Moorit is a rare breed of domestic sheep (also known as Moorit Shetland, Milledge Sheep, or Castlemilk Shetland) originating in Dumfriesshire in Scotland.

Created as a decorative breed in the 1900s to adorn the parkland of Sir John Buchanan Jardine's estate, it is a mixture of several primitive types: Manx Loaghtan, Shetland, Soay and Wiltshire Horn. The breed's name refers to the Castlemilk Estate on which they were bred, and the Lowland Scots word "moorit" refers to the light tan or reddish-brown colour of their fleeces.

The Castlemilk Moorit is one of the Northern European short-tailed sheep group of breeds, having a short, triangular tail. It has horns in both sexes and a fleece that is usually moulted or rooed (plucked) rather than needing shearing. All Castlemilk Moorits are descended from a single flock of ten ewes and two rams, and the British Rare Breeds Survival Trust lists the breed as "at risk", having a maximum of 1500 registered animals.

An important offshore population of Castlemilk Moorits in the Netherlands (flockbook VSS) and Belgium (flockbook SLE) helps to guarantee the future of the breed. The main use of this breed is hobby farming.
