= Scottish Blackface =

British breed of sheep

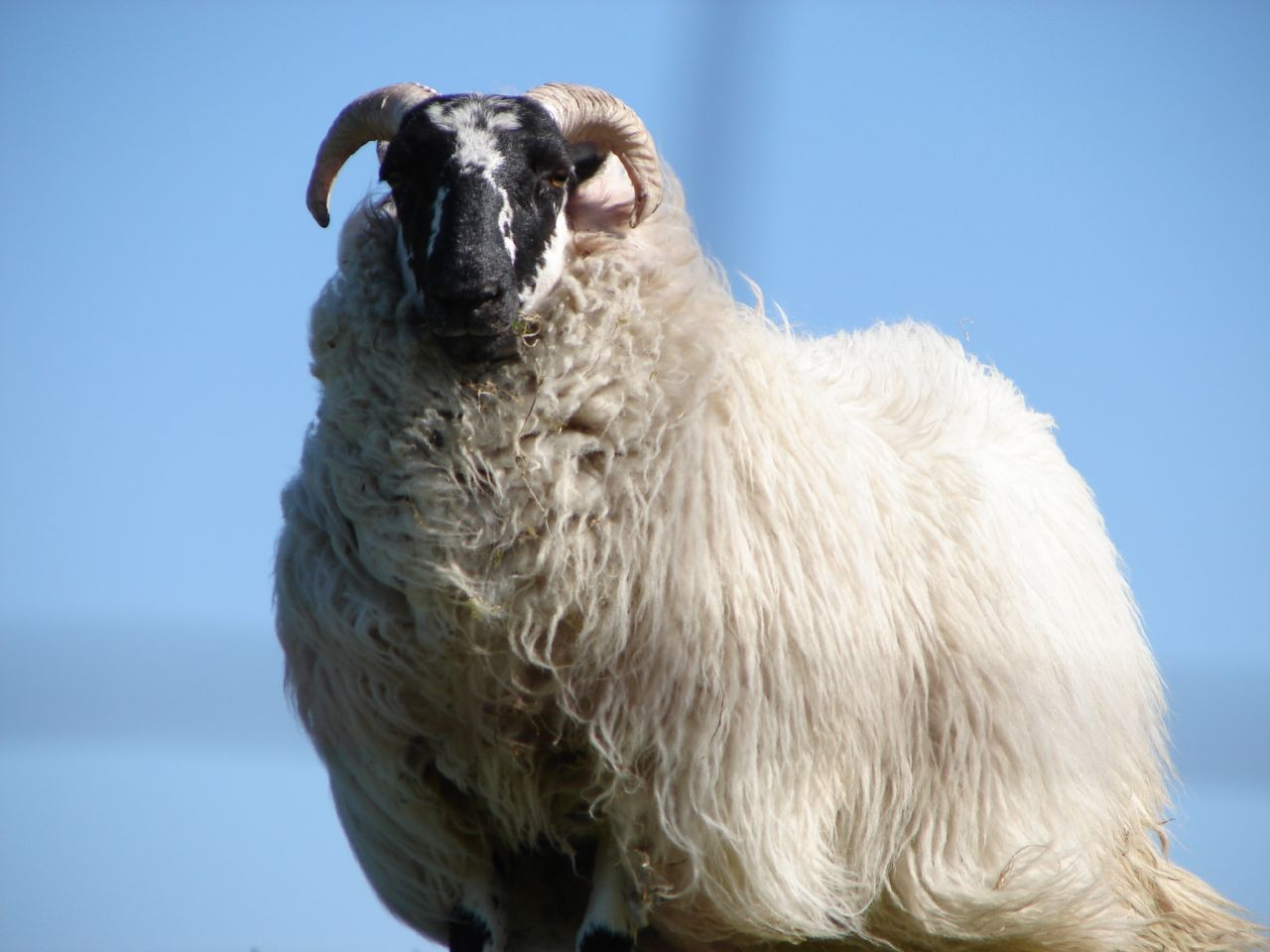
- In the Outer Hebrides

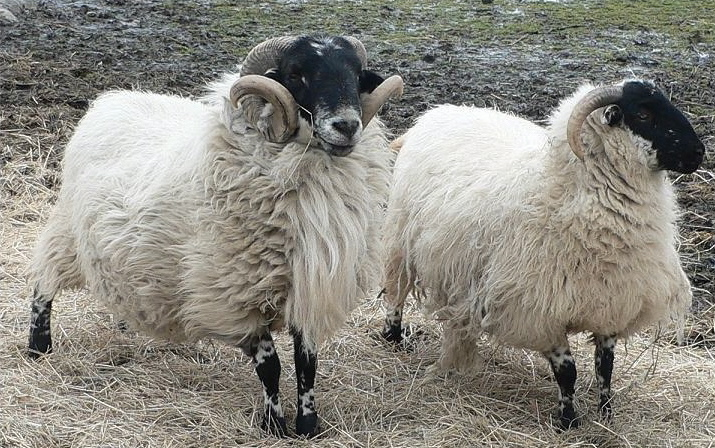
- Ram and ewe
- Conservation status: FAO (2007): not at risk; DAD-IS (2022): at risk; RBST: UK native breeds
- Other names: Blackface; Lanark Blackface; Lewis Blackface; Linton; Newton Stewart Blackface; Northumberland Blackface; Perth Blackface
- Country of origin: United Kingdom
- Use: meat

Traits
- Weight: Male: 80 kg; Female: 50 kg
- Wool colour: white
- Face colour: black, sometimes with white markings
- Horn status: horned

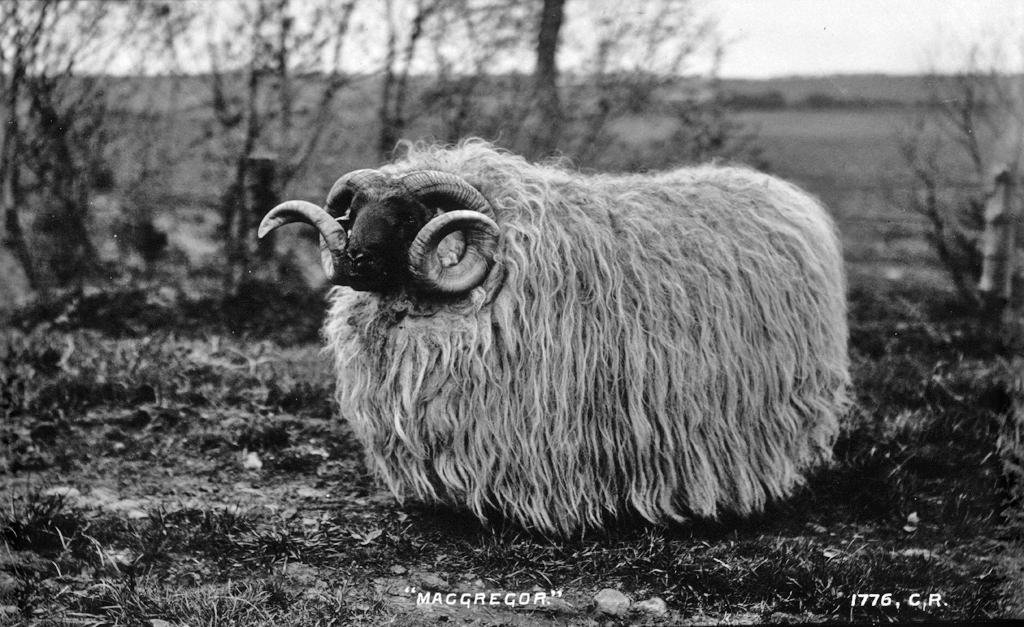
A ram in about 1890

The Blackface or Scottish Blackface is a British breed of sheep. It is the most common sheep breed of the United Kingdom. Despite the name, it did not originate in Scotland, but south of the border.

== History ==
The origins of the breed are uncertain. It originated south of the Anglo-Scottish border, and did not arrive in the Highlands of Scotland until the second half of the eighteenth century. It replaced the earlier Scottish Dun-face or Old Scottish Shortwool, a Northern European short-tailed sheep type probably similar to the modern Shetland.

There are several types of Blackface in the United Kingdom, including the Perth variety, which is large-framed and coarse-woolled, and found mainly in north-east Scotland, in Devon, in Cornwall and in Northern Ireland; the medium-framed Lanark type, with shorter wool, found in much of Scotland and in parts of Ireland; the more compact Galloway or Newton Stewart type, distributed in western and south-western Scotland, where rainfall is higher; and the smaller Lewis type of the Western Isles. There is also a Northumberland Blackface, which is large with relatively soft wool, but is not classed as a distinct type.

The Blackface is the most numerous sheep breed of the United Kingdom: in the last decade of the twentieth century, approximately 14% of all ewes in the country were of this breed. In the early 2000s there were some 1.5 to 1.7 million ewes, about half as many again as the number of Welsh Mountain ewes and more than double the number of Swaledale. It is also present in small numbers in Canada, Colombia, France, Nepal, Norway and the USA.

== Characteristics ==
The Blackface is always horned. The face and legs are black, sometimes with white markings. Average body weights of sheep kept on hill pasture are approximately 50 kg for ewes and 80 kg for rams; sheep kept on lowlands may reach greater weights, up to 65 kg for ewes.

== Use ==
The Blackface is reared principally for meat production, usually through cross-breeding. Blackface ewes are commonly put to rams of crossing sire breeds: the Scotch Mule results from the cross with Blue-faced Leicester rams, and the Greyface from crossing with Border Leicester. Ewes of these cross-breeds retain some characteristics of each parent – maternal qualities and hardiness from the dam, and fecundity and meat quality from the sire – and are much used in commercial lowland sheep-rearing.

The wool is very coarse, with a fibre diameter of 28–38 μm and a staple length of about 250–350 mm. It may be used for mattresses, for carpets, or to make tweed.
