= Manx Loaghtan =

Breed of sheep

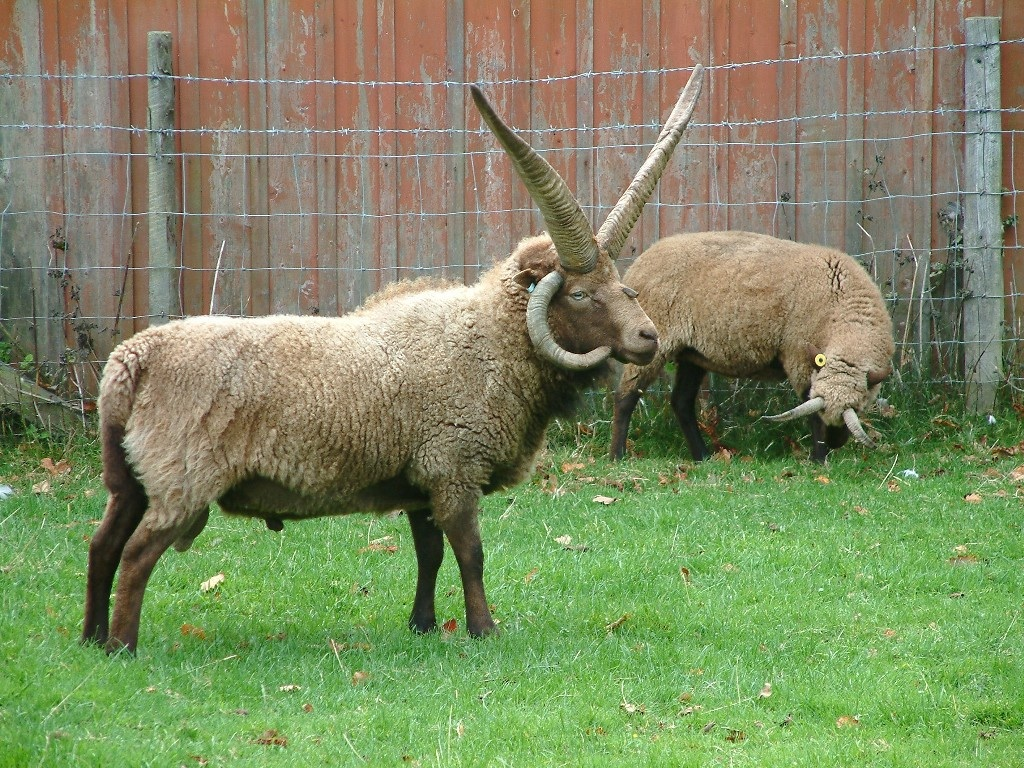
- Manx Loaghtan sheep at The Grove, Rural Life Museum, Ramsey, Isle of Man
- Conservation status: RBST (2025): PRIORITY
- Country of origin: Isle of Man
- Use: Meat, wool

Traits
- Horn status: Horned, with two, four or six horns.

The Manx Loaghtan (/ˈlɒxtən/ LOKH-tən) is a rare breed of sheep (Ovis aries) native to the Isle of Man. It is sometimes spelled as Loaghtyn or Loghtan. The sheep have dark brown wool and usually four or occasionally six horns.

The Manx Loaghtan is one of the Northern European short-tailed sheep breeds, and descends from the primitive sheep once found throughout Scotland, the Hebrides, and Shetland Islands. The word Loaghtan comes from the Manx words lugh dhoan, which mean mouse-brown and describe the colour of the sheep. This breed is primarily raised for its meat, which some consider a delicacy. In 2008, the meat received EU recognition and protection under the Protected Designation of Origin scheme, which requires products with a regional name to originate in the named region.

The Rare Breeds Survival Trust characterised the Loaghtan as "at risk" until 2025 when it was elevated to “priority” status owing to declining numbers. By the 1950s there were only 43 surviving specimens. Manx National Heritage developed two healthy flocks. These have given rise to commercial flocks on the Isle of Man, United Kingdom and Jersey. Even so, today there are still fewer than 1,500 registered breeding females.

== Appearance ==
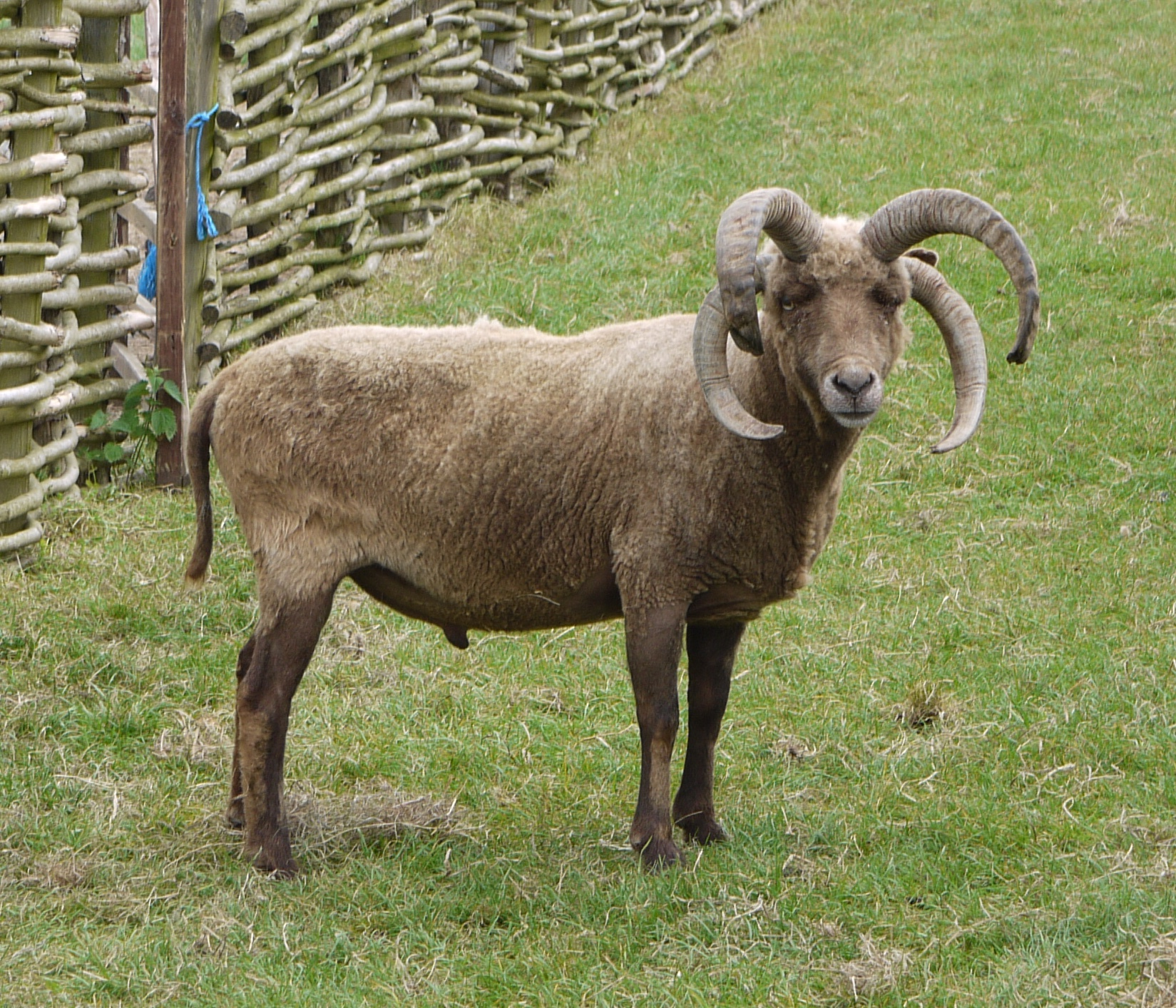
A Manx Loaghtan at Butser Ancient Farm

The Manx Loaghtan is a small sheep, with no wool on their dark brown faces and legs. The sheep have short tails and are fine-boned. In the past century the sheep's colour has stabilised as "moorit", that is shades between fawn and dark reddish brown, though the colour bleaches in the sun. Manx Loaghtan usually have four horns, but individuals are also found with two or six horns. The horns are generally small on the ewes but larger and stronger on the males. An adult female weighs about 40 kg, and an adult male weighs around 60 kg.

== Products ==
=== Meat ===
The Loaghtan is farmed for its meat on the Isle of Man, with only two principal farms on the island producing it. There are now many holdings on the UK mainland that also breed Loaghtans, including some farms with over 100 ewes: for example the Fowlescombe Flock in Devon. This gourmet meat is highly prized, often being sold as hogget or mutton from well-finished animals. A 15-month-old will yield a carcass of 18 kg of lean meat.

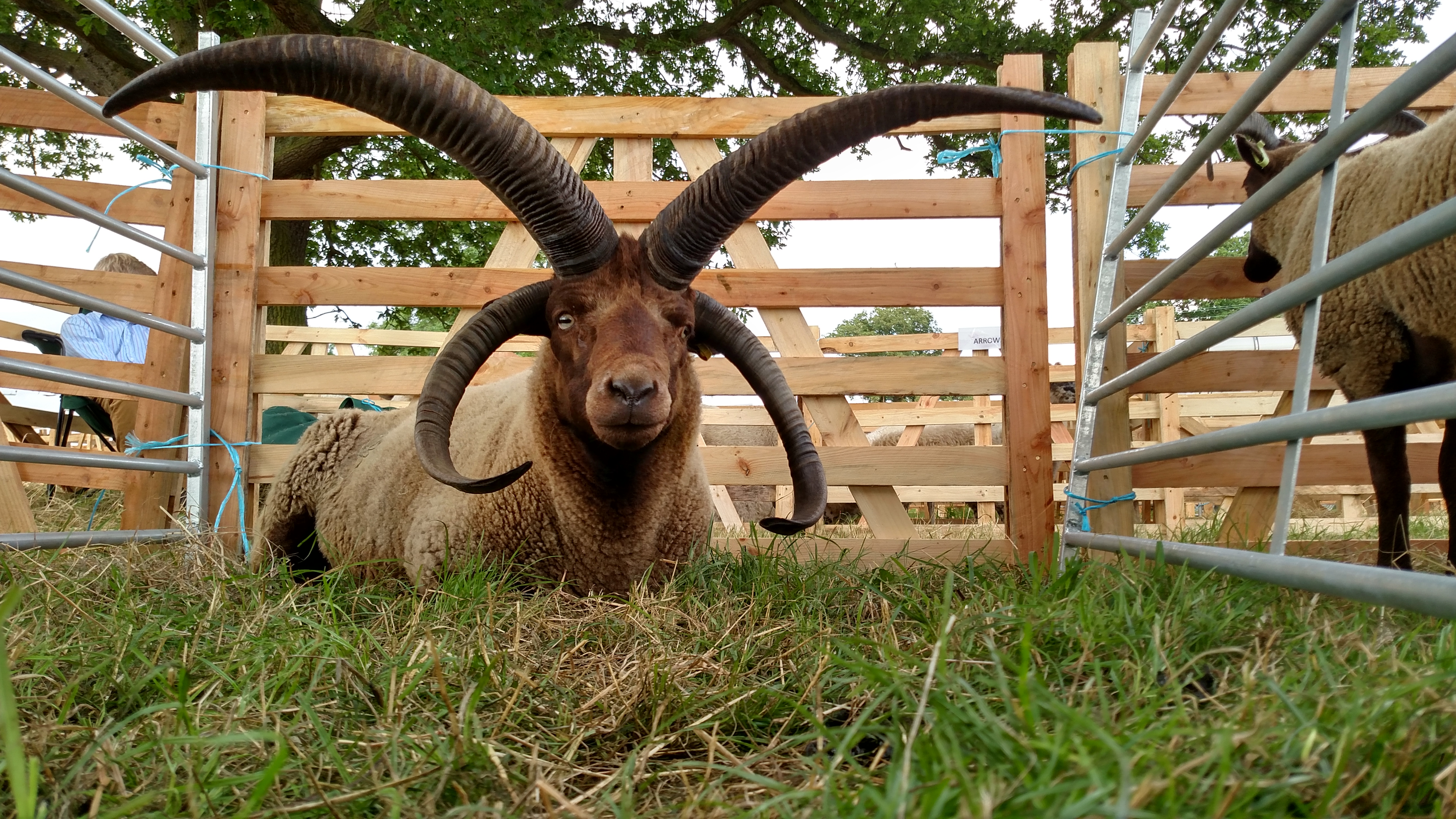
Manx Loaghtan sheep at the Ryedale agricultural show

There is a large flock of the sheep on the Calf of Man, and access to the Isle of Man was closed to protect them during the 2001 UK Foot and Mouth Disease epidemic. The disease did not reach the island itself, nor the Calf, which continued exports of the meat to the continent of Europe.

The breed is listed in the Ark of Taste, an international catalogue of endangered heritage foods that the global Slow Food movement maintains.

=== Wool ===
Craft spinners and weavers like the wool for its softness and rich brown colour. The crafters use the undyed material to produce woollens and tweeds.

The Loaghtan's wool has a high coating of lanolin wax, also known as wool wax or wool grease. Warm weather makes the lanolin viscous, which aids shearing. Some speciality soap producers also use the lanolin as an ingredient in a mild soap.

== Jersey ==
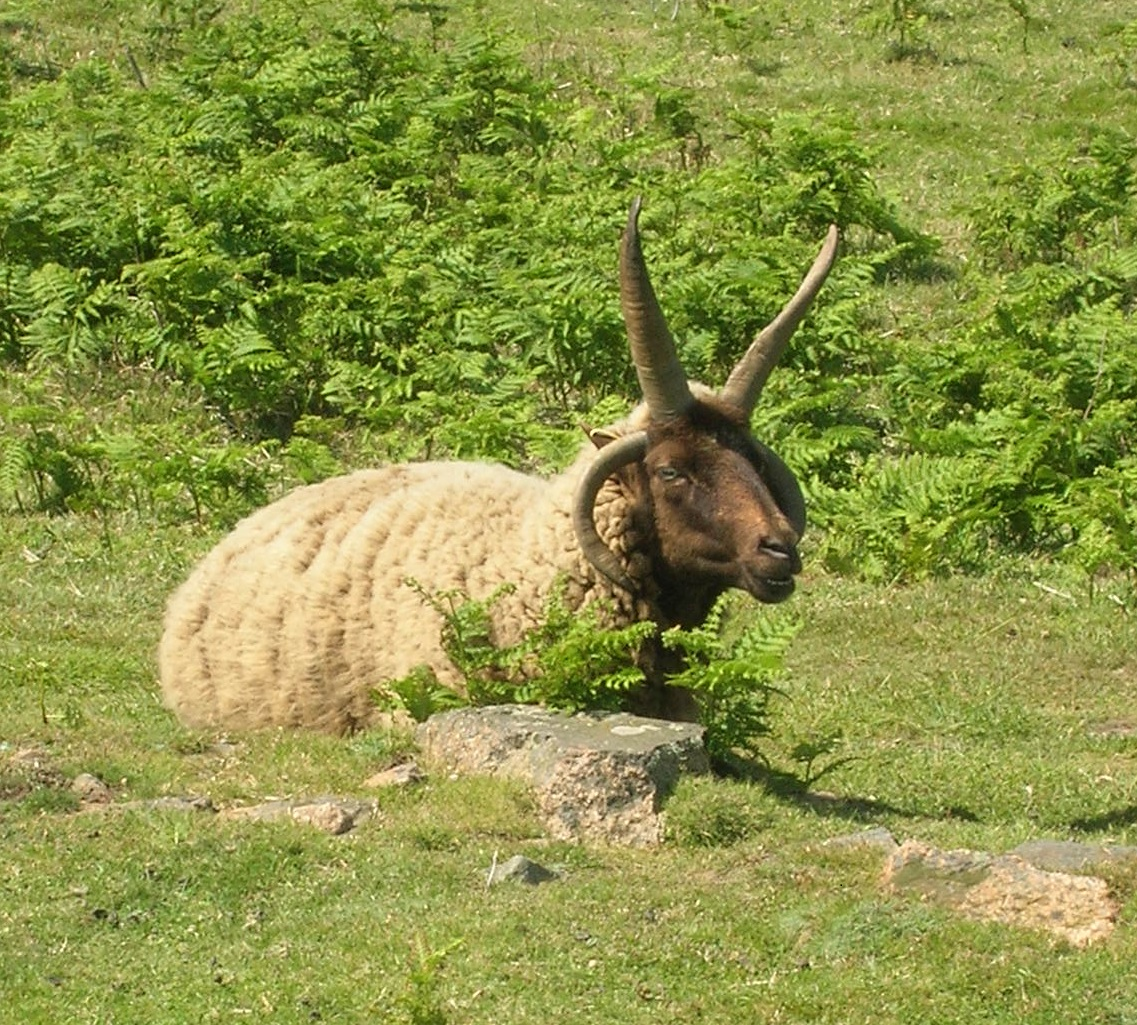
Loaghtan sheep on Jersey

The Loaghtan is believed to be the closest surviving relative of the now extinct Jersey sheep. Already in medieval times, Jersey was famous for its woolens. Consequently, the name of the island became a generic term for the jersey, an item of knitted clothing, worn as a pullover.

In 2008 the National Trust for Jersey began a programme of introducing Loaghtans into Jersey for coastal grazing, a traditional method of vegetation control in the north of Jersey. In 2014, two shepherds cared for a flock that had grown from 20 to 231 animals. The wool from Jersey's flock of Loaghtans is sold locally.

== Ecology ==
There appears to be a link between the presence of Loaghtan sheep and the ability of the chough to thrive. Studies on Ramsey Island, Bardsey Island, and the Isle of Man have found that as the number of grazing sheep fell, so did the number of breeding choughs; when sheep grazing increased, so did the number of breeding choughs. This appears to be happening on Jersey as well.

As the Loaghtans graze, they crop and trample the grass. This enables the birds to reach surface-active and soil insects. Also, the dung the sheep leave draws beetles and fly larvae. These insects in turn are a resource for the birds when the ground is hard or other insects are scarce.

== See also ==
- Castlemilk Moorit
- Hebridean sheep
- Icelandic sheep
- Jacob sheep
- Rare breed (agriculture)
