= Shetland sheep =

Breed of sheep

Shetland
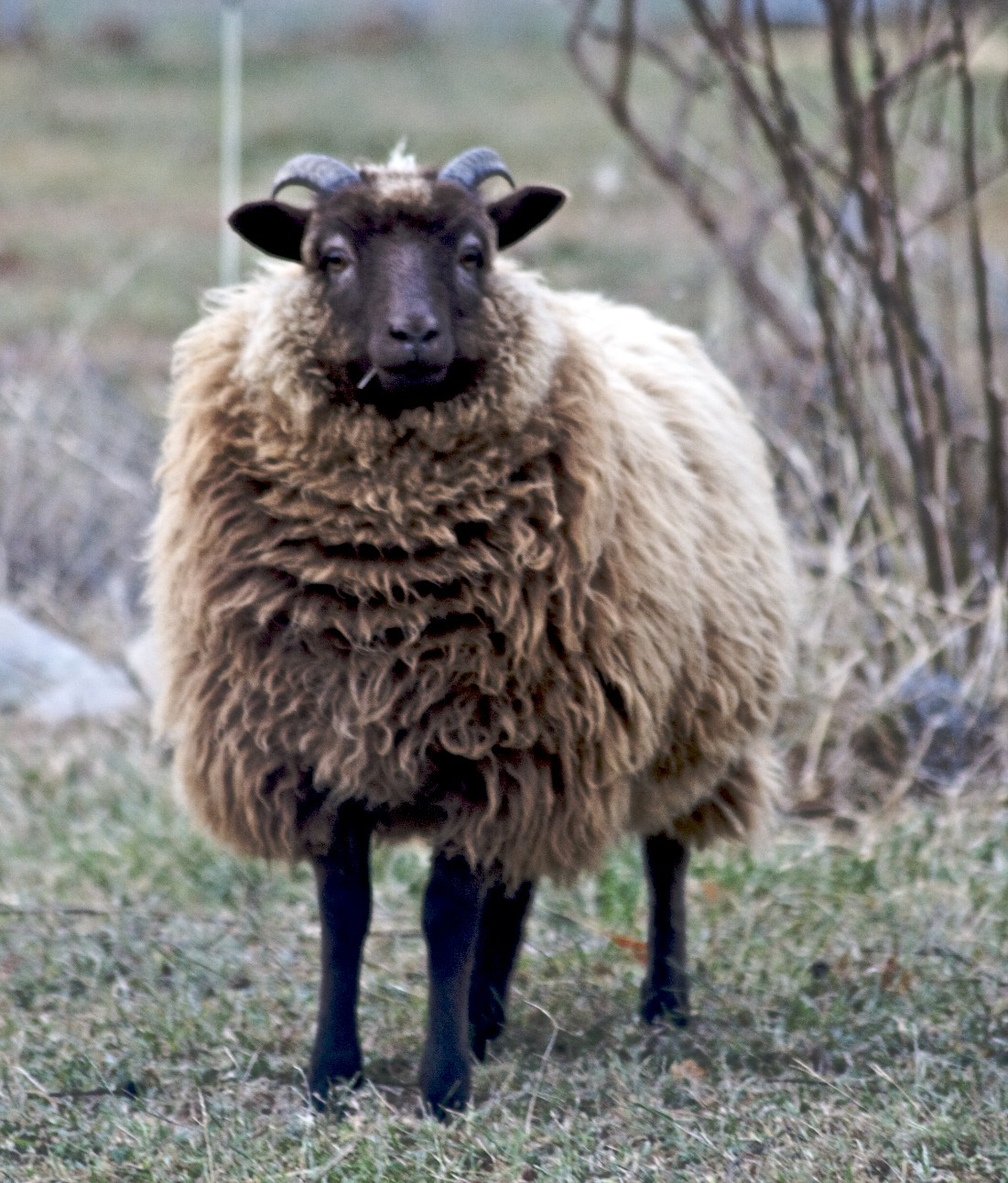
- A Shetland lamb with the common "moorit" (reddish brown) colour
- Country of origin: Scotland (Shetland)
- Type: Northern European short-tailed
- Use: Wool, meat, conservation grazing

Traits
- Weight: Male: 41–57 kg; Female: 34–45 kg
- Wool color: Variable
- Face color: Variable
- Horn status: Males horned, ewes occasionally horned

The Shetland is a small, wool-producing breed of sheep originating in the Shetland Isles, Scotland, but is now also kept in many other parts of the world. It is part of the Northern European short-tailed sheep group, and it is closely related to the extinct Scottish Dunface. This breed is kept for its very fine wool, for meat, and for conservation grazing.

Shetlands are small and slow-growing compared to commercial breeds. However, the Shetland breed has been able to survive for centuries in difficult conditions and on a poor diet. Shetlands retain many of their primitive survival instincts, so they are easier to care for than many modern breeds.

== History ==
Up to the Iron Age, the sheep of the British Isles and other parts of northern and western Europe were small, short-tailed, horned only in the male and variable in colour. Short-tailed sheep were gradually displaced by long-tailed types, leaving short-tailed sheep restricted to the less accessible areas. These included the Scottish Dunface, which until the late eighteenth century was the main sheep type throughout the Highlands and Islands of Scotland, including Orkney and Shetland. The Dunface died out on the mainland, Scotland, in the late nineteenth century, leaving its descendants limited to a few islands, including the Shetland Isles. The Shetland type of the Dunface has been regarded as distinct since the early nineteenth century or before. Patterns of flock distribution in the period 1795-1965 reveal the numeric decline of Shetland sheep and their eventual confinement to Shetland. By 1965 only 4% of the sheep recorded for Hill Sheep Subsidy were Shetland sheep.

=== Breed conservation ===
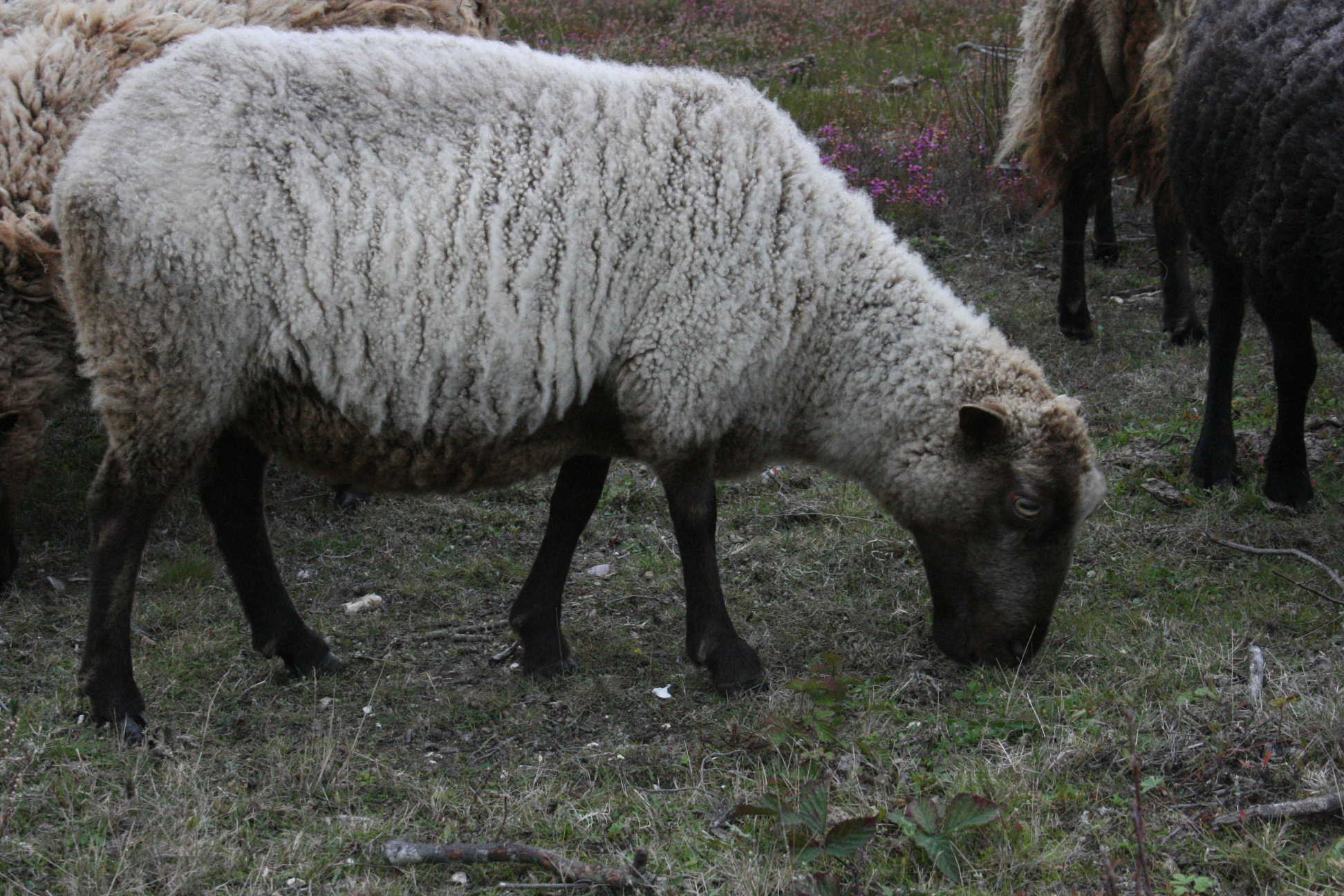
Shetland ewe grazing on heathland: this "badger-faced" pattern is called katmoget.

By the early twentieth century, the Shetland was perceived as threatened by cross-breeding, leading to a decline in wool quality. To combat this, the Shetland Flock Book Society was formed in 1927, and this remains the body responsible for the protection of the breed in Shetland.

By the time the Rare Breeds Survival Trust was set up in the 1970s, the Shetland had become rare, and it was listed by them as Category 2 (Endangered). Since then, the breed has become popular with smallholders, and it is now classified as Category 6 (Other native breeds), with a UK population of over 3000. On the mainland the breed is governed by the Shetland Sheep Society.

=== Export and history outside the Shetland isles ===
A Shetland ram was kept by United States President Thomas Jefferson for several years in the early nineteenth century. Unlike modern Shetlands (but like some related breeds) this ram had four horns. He was kept with about 40 other sheep on President's Square in front of the White House. In the spring of 1808, it attacked several people who had taken shortcuts across the square, injuring some and actually killing a small boy. Having been moved to Jefferson's private estate at Monticello, the ram was eventually killed after having killed several other rams: it was described by Jefferson as "this abominable animal". Such aggressive Shetland rams, however, are unusual.

In North America, the original Jefferson flock of Shetlands did not persist. Other importations were made at the beginning of the twentieth century most notably to Mrs. W.W. Burch of Coopersville, MI (wife of the Editor of the American Sheep Breeder at the time), and Mr. L.V. Harkness of the Walnut Hall (the same of Standardbred Horse fame). There is record of these flocks surviving until 1916, and also record of another flock in Illinois in 1917. By 1921, it was recorded that Shetlands could not be bought in the US (The Sheep Breeder, 1921). It was not until the mid-twentieth century that Shetlands were imported into Canada, and then from Canada into the United States in the 1980s. Since then, a North American Shetland Sheep Registry has been established, and there are now thousands of the breed in the region.

=== Modern farming ===
Today, Shetland sheep are mainly kept in the Shetland isles and a handful of other places. This is because of their ability to survive on infertile land that would otherwise be agriculturally useless. Their good-natured temperament is also a major attraction in keeping Shetland sheep. They are most commonly farmed for their prized wool, but they also may be kept for their meat.

== Breed characteristics ==
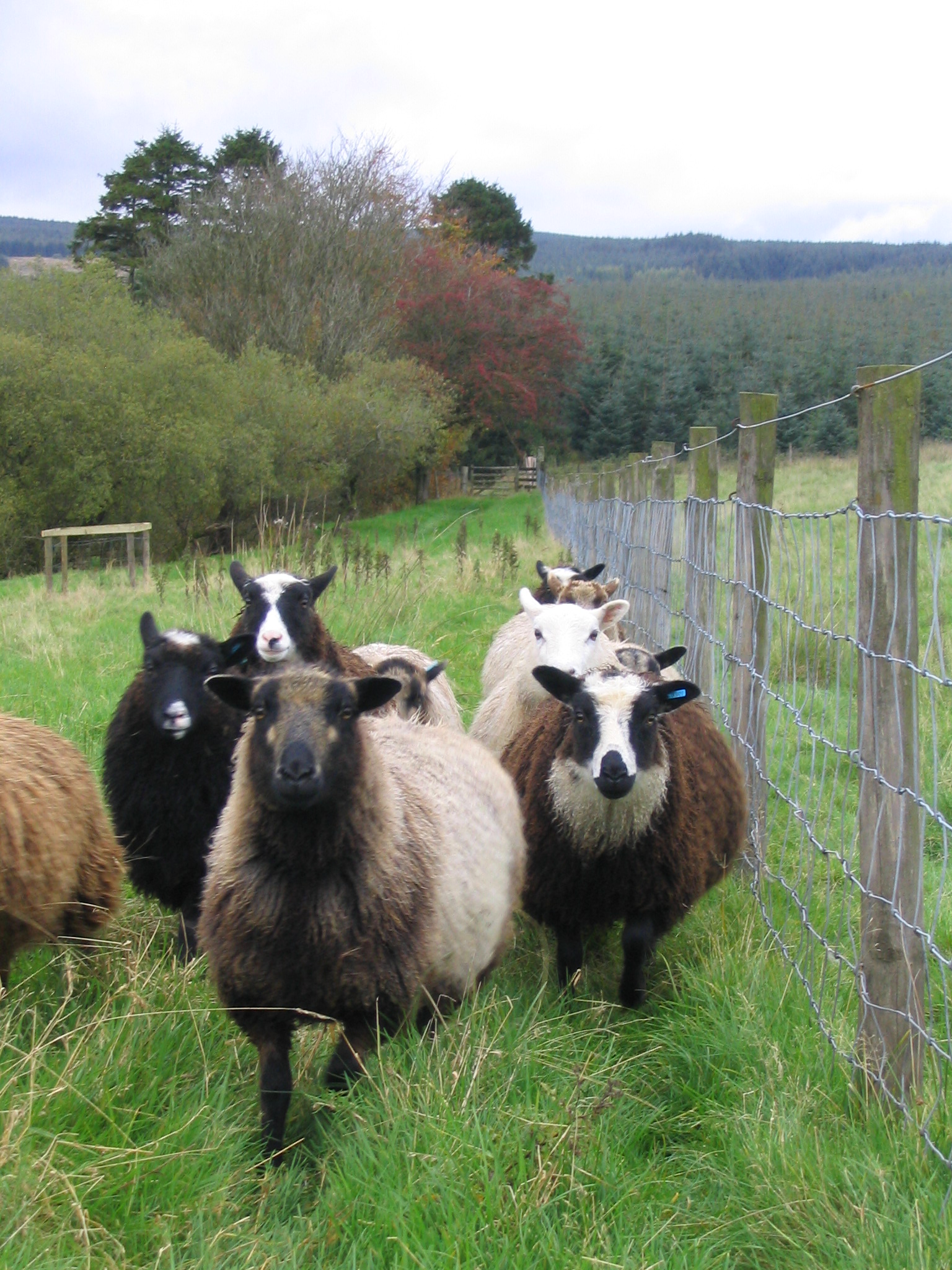
Shetlands appear in a wide variety of colours, many of which are called by their traditional names by breeders.

The Shetland is one of the smallest British breeds. The ewes are usually polled (hornless) and the rams usually horned, although horned ewes and polled rams do occur occasionally. The breed is noted for its very fine, soft wool and the high quality of its meat, though its smaller size limits its use in commercial meat markets. They are small-bodied animals, with some wool on their faces, noses or legs, but not in excess. The legs are of medium length and finely boned. They have small, erect ears. A distinguishing feature of northern short-tailed sheep is the short, fluke-shaped tail, broad at the base, tapering to a point, and covered towards the tip in hair, not wool.

Shetlands occur in many different colours and patterns, most of which have particular traditional names. The rams weigh approximately 90 to 125 lb (41 to 57 kg) and ewes about 75 to 100 lb (34 to 45 kg).

=== Wool ===
The wool produced by the Shetland has historically been a valuable commodity. Shetlands produce numerous shades of wool colours (see below), and this variety was commercially important to the wool industry of the Shetland Isles, where natural wools are often used undyed. Tweed is also produced from the coarser Shetland wool, but the Isles are best known for their multi-coloured knitwear (made using Fair Isle knitting) and for the traditional knitted lace shawls which are so fine, they will pass through a wedding ring. Fleeces usually weigh between 2 and 4 lb (0.9 and 1.8 kg).

In November 2011, Shetland wool produced in Shetland gained protected geographical status with a protected designation of origin (PDO) classification as "Native Shetland Wool". It was the first non-food product in the UK to receive this status.

==== Colours and patterns ====
Shetland sheep can show almost all possible sheep colours and patterns (some of which are still being catalogued), although solid white and solid moorit (reddish-brown) or black are most common. Many of the colours and patterns have Shetland dialect names – these derive from the Norn language formerly spoken in Shetland, and similar names are also used in at least one other Nordic language: Icelandic.

Eleven main colours are recognised by the breed association (most including many different shades): light grey, grey, white, emsket (dusky bluish-grey), musket (light greyish-brown), shaela (dark steely-grey), black, fawn, moorit (reddish brown), mioget (honey-toned, yellowish-brown), and dark brown.

Thirty coat patterns and markings are recognised, many of which can occur in combination. They include:

- katmoget ("badger-face": dark belly and dark shading around nose and eyes, lighter elsewhere)
- gulmoget ("mouflon", the reverse of katmoget: light belly, dark face with light marks around eyes, dark elsewhere)
- yuglet (generally light with dark "panda" patches around the eyes)
- bleset (dark with white blaze down face)
- smirslet (white marking around the muzzle)
- sokket (with white socks on the legs)
- bersugget (irregular patches of different colours)
- bielset (with a collar of a differing colour).

=== Lambing ===
Like other "primitive" breeds, the ewes are highly seasonal, becoming fertile in October and November (in the Northern Hemisphere) and lambing in spring or summer. On the poor grazing of Shetland, the lambing percentage is about 130%. However, when the ewes are on better pasture, twin lambs are more common, especially from mature ewes. Shetland ewes are hardy, easy lambers, good mothers and produce ample milk. Healthy lambs are born with a weight between 4 and 7 lb (2 and 3 kg).

== See also ==
- Shetland animal breeds
