= North Ronaldsay sheep =

Breed of sheep from Scotland

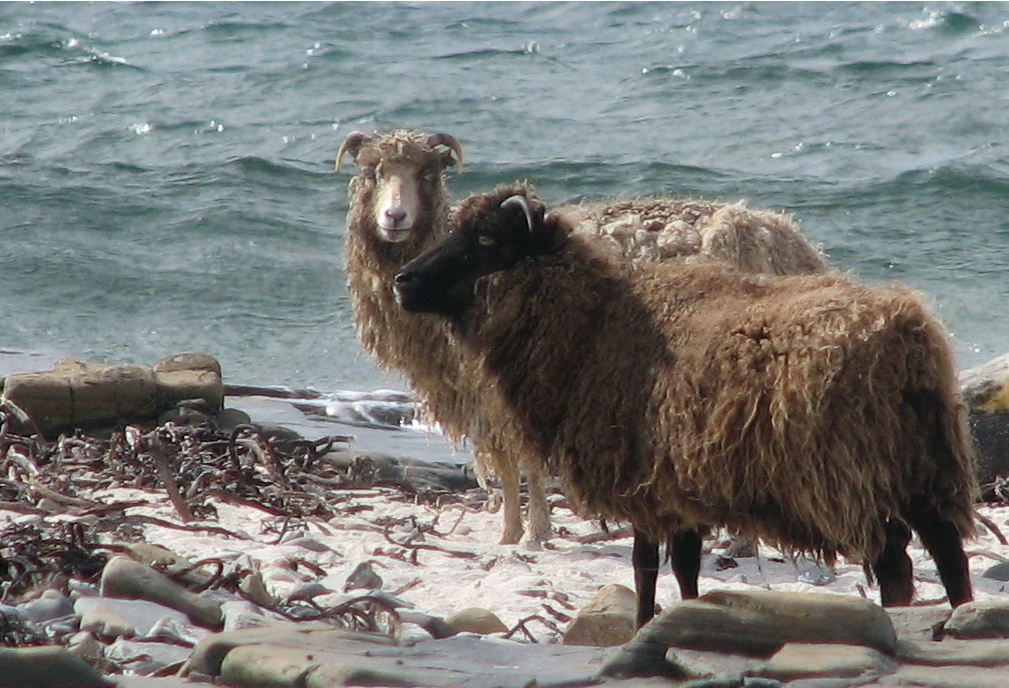
- Two sheep on the shoreline of North Ronaldsay
- Conservation status: FAO (2007): Endangered; RBST (2017): Category 3
- Country of origin: Scotland
- Use: meat, wool

Traits
- Weight: Male: 30 kg (65 lb); Female: 25 kg (55 lb)
- Height: Male: 41 cm (16 in); Female: 41 cm (16 in)
- Wool colour: white, grey, brown, black
- Horn status: horned

The North Ronaldsay or Orkney is a breed of sheep from North Ronaldsay, the northernmost island of Orkney, off the north coast of Scotland. It belongs to the Northern European short-tailed sheep group of breeds, and has evolved without much cross-breeding with modern breeds. It is a smaller sheep than most, with the rams (males) horned and ewes (females) mostly hornless. It was formerly kept primarily for wool, but now the two largest flocks are feral, one on North Ronaldsay and another on the Orkney island of Auskerry. The Rare Breeds Survival Trust lists the breed as a priority on its 2021–2022 watchlist, and they are in danger of extinction, with fewer than 600 registered breeding females in the United Kingdom.

The semi-feral flock on North Ronaldsay is the original flock that evolved to subsist almost entirely on seaweed – they are one of few mammals to do this. They are confined to the foreshore by a 1.8 m (6 ft) early 19th-century drystane dyke, which completely encircles the island, forcing the evolution of this unusual characteristic. The wall was built as kelping (the production of soda ash from seaweed) on the shore became uneconomical. Sheep were confined to the shore to protect the fields and crofts inside, and afterwards they subsisted largely on seaweed.

This diet has caused a variety of adaptations in the sheep's digestive system. These sheep now extract the trace element copper far more efficiently than other breeds as their diet of seaweed has a limited supply of copper. This results in them being susceptible to copper toxicity if fed on a grass diet, as copper is toxic to sheep in high quantities. Grazing habits have also changed to suit the sheep's environment. They graze at low tide when the seaweed is exposed and then ruminate at high tide.

A range of fleece colours is exhibited, including grey, brown and red. Meat from the North Ronaldsay has a distinctive flavour, described as "intense" and "gamey", possibly in part due to the high iodine content in their diet of seaweed.

== History ==
=== Origin ===
A North Ronaldsay sheep with twin lambs on the beach, with seals in the background

The sheep are descended from the Northern European short-tailed sheep. Their arrival onto North Ronaldsay is not known precisely but it may have been as early as the Iron Age, or possibly even earlier, which would make them potentially the earliest ovines to arrive in Britain. Because of their isolated location, they have evolved without much admixture from imported Roman and European breeds. They share some characteristics, including their colour range and short tails, with Scandinavian sheep introduced when the islands were under Norse control, between the 9th and 15th centuries.

=== Enclosure ===
In 1832, a drystane dyke (wall) was erected on the island. Its construction was part of the response to the collapse of the kelping industry, which was the production of soda ash by the burning of seaweed. To provide a livelihood for those previously employed in kelping, the inland farmlands were reorganized, and the sheep kept away from the fields or crofts. Since then, the flocks on the island have been feral. The wall also unintentionally reduced the chances of crossbreeding, which would have diluted the gene pool of an already vulnerable breed. The wall circles the entire coast of the island, 19 km (12 mi), and is 1.8 metres (6 ft) high, making it one of the largest dry stone walls in the world. In 1999, Historic Scotland described it as a "unique and important structure" and designated it an 'A'-list site requiring conservation. This status affords it special protection; any development has to be approved with conservation in mind.

Since the wall was erected, the human population of North Ronaldsay has fallen from 500 to around 50, and current residents lack the manpower to maintain the wall. Successive storms, the most damaging of which was in December 2012, have created large holes in the structure. The cost of repairs has been estimated at several million pounds. In 1902, it cost only 4 pence per hour to repair the wall, using stone taken from the shore. In 2015, Orkney Islands Council reported that some 4.7 km (3 mi) of the wall was in need of work, and that the rate of damage exceeded that of repair.

=== Punds ===
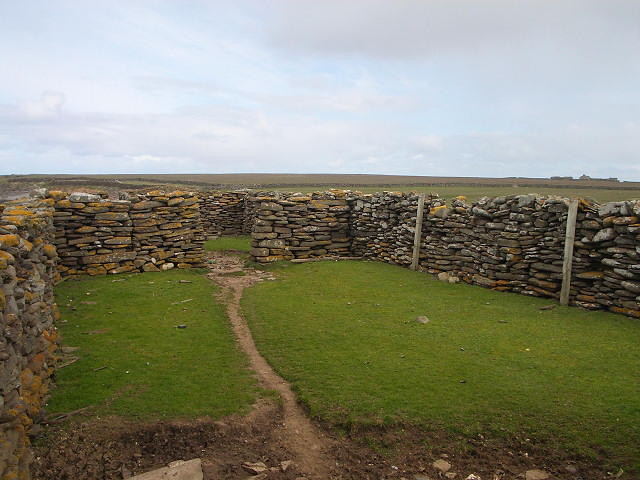
An example of a pund

The punds, or pounds, also listed with Historic Scotland, are nine small enclosures situated across the island to contain the sheep for shearing, counting, lambing and slaughtering. The sheep are herded inside these punds twice a year, the only time they have access to grass feed. Between February and August, the sheep are brought into the punds, once for lambing and once for shearing. The lambs are born on the grass between February and May. At this time, the sheep are counted, lambs are given ear tags, and records are entered with the island's sheep court to record ownership. Shearing takes place in July and August, and the whole island community is involved in herding and shearing the sheep. Slaughtering takes place only in winter when the meat is needed, and when the animals are fatter and yield more meat, since seaweed is more abundant in winter.

=== Sheep court ===
In 1839, just after the wall was erected, the North Ronaldsay Sheep Court was created. A group of eleven appointed islanders were responsible for the maintenance of the wall, the health of the sheep flock, and recording ownership of the sheep. Today, the Sheep Court remains the regulatory body responsible for organising ownership of the sheep.

=== Conservation ===
The North Ronaldsay Sheep Fellowship is one of several organisations concerned with the survival of the breed. They maintain the flock book, established in 1974, which is the breed registry containing all purebred animals. This book reports that there are fewer than 600 breeding females and roughly 3700 sheep in total. The Rare Breeds Survival Trust (RBST) lists the North Ronaldsay as "vulnerable".

Other island-based organisations include The North Ronaldsay Trust and the Orkney Sheep Foundation, who run an annual Sheep Festival (SheepFest) inviting volunteers to the island for a fortnight of sheepdyke rebuilding.

There are only two main populations of the breed. The primary one is on the island of North Ronaldsay itself; the other is on the island of Auskerry, which was established in 1983 by Teresa Probert and Simon Brogan. Modern DNA analysis has shown little crossbreeding with other sheep breeds from mainland Britain. Testing carried out under the National Scrapie Plan looked for the ARQ allele, which protects against the scrapie disease and is present in modern selectively bred sheep, and found it in only 1.3 per cent of North Ronaldsay sheep.

Further DNA studies comparing the bones of the North Ronaldsay with remains of North European short-tailed sheep found on a Skara Brae site dating from around 3000 BCE have shown a very close match, suggesting that the North Ronaldsay has not genetically mixed with other breeds.

== Characteristics ==
=== Physical ===
North Ronaldsays are very small sheep, an adaptation to the harsh, cold environment. Rams typically weigh around 30 kg (65 lb), and ewes rarely exceed 25 kg (55 lb), both standing around 41 cm (16 in) high at the withers (shoulders). The sheep are slow-growing and a full-size carcass may weigh only 13.6 kilograms (30 lb).

The North Ronaldsay is a descendant of the primitive European short-tailed sheep breed. As the name of the descent parent would suggest, they have naturally short tails. Their bones are finer than other breeds and their head is dished (sloping inwards). Rams are all horned; these horns are typically ridged and spiraled. Only 20 per cent of the ewes are horned; the rest are polled (hornless).

=== Diet ===
North Ronaldsay sheep have a highly unusual diet consisting almost solely of seaweed. This has evolved due to their unique location, confined to the shoreline by a 1.8 m (6 ft) dry stone wall, leaving only seaweed for food. Apart from the marine iguana, native to the Galapagos Islands, it is the only land animal known to have such a diet. Studies have shown that, due to preference and availability, the sheep eat mainly kelps (Laminaria digitata and Laminaria hyperborea). This discovery led to suggestions that these kelps may be of use as an alternative food source for other livestock.

The grazing habits of the sheep have also adapted to their unusual diet: instead of grazing during the day and ruminating (digesting) at night as other sheep generally do, the North Ronaldsays graze as the tide uncovers the shore (twice in 24 hours), ruminating at high water. Feeding begins around 3.5 hours after high tide as the areas of kelp and seaweed are exposed. Four hours later, which is just after the low tide, feeding ends, allowing rumination to begin. This cycle reduces the chance of the sheep becoming stranded at sea by the incoming tide.

In spring, mother ewes are taken to grasslands without access to seaweed for lambing, and are only returned to the shore around August. The other sheep (males and non-pregnant females) remain on the shore, primarily consuming seaweed, throughout the year. Unusually for sheep, the North Ronaldsay fattens in winter when storms throw larger amounts of kelp and seaweed onto the shore and food is abundant.

The sheep's source of fresh water is limited to the few freshwater lochs and ponds along the seashore. This has led them to become very salt tolerant, as their diet is salt-rich, and access to fresh water is limited. Compared with other breeds of sheep, they can far better handle elements present in the sea salt. These empirical conclusions were drawn in a 1997 study, but the underlying biological mechanism has yet to be understood.

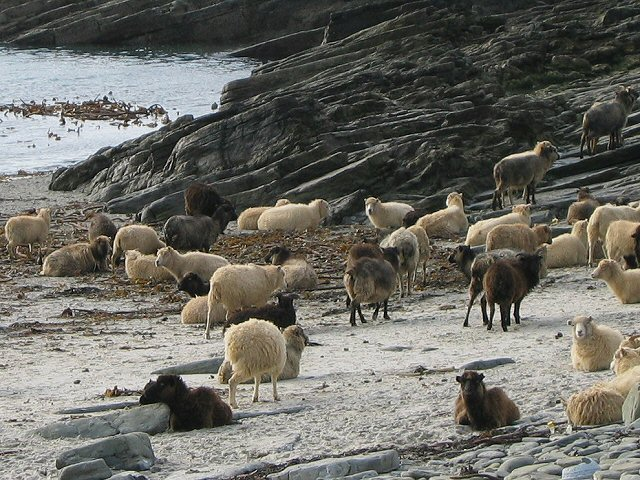
A herd of North Ronaldsay sheep on the beach

==== Scientific analysis ====
The sheep have evolved a somewhat different physiology from other sheep, due to their unusual diet: their digestive system has adapted to extract the sugars in seaweeds more efficiently. A 2005 study at the University of Liverpool found that they have a greater susceptibility to copper toxicity, when compared with a more traditional breed such as the Cambridge. This is because seaweed has a chemical which inhibits the absorption of copper, so the sheep have to absorb copper more efficiently to obtain the required amount. The levels of copper found in typical sheep feed, including grass, are toxic for this breed. Studies at the Universities of Liverpool and Minnesota suggest that they can extract four times more copper from their diet than more traditional breeds.

Stable isotope ratio analysis of bone collagen and tooth enamel from seaweed-eating North Ronaldsay sheep have revealed elevated stable carbon isotope ratios (δ^{13}C) compared to sheep feeding on C_{3}-vegetation. This difference in stable carbon isotope ratios (arising from dietary differences), discovered by studying North Ronaldsay sheep, is made use of in archaeological studies, which have shown the existence of seaweed-eating sheep on Orkney around 5000 years ago.

== Use ==
=== Meat ===
When the United Kingdom was in the European Union, lamb and mutton from the sheep could be marketed as "Orkney Lamb", which had Protected Designation of Origin status. The meat has a unique, rich flavour, which has been described as "intense and almost gamey", and has a darker colour than most mutton, due in part to the animals' iodine-rich diet.

=== Wool ===
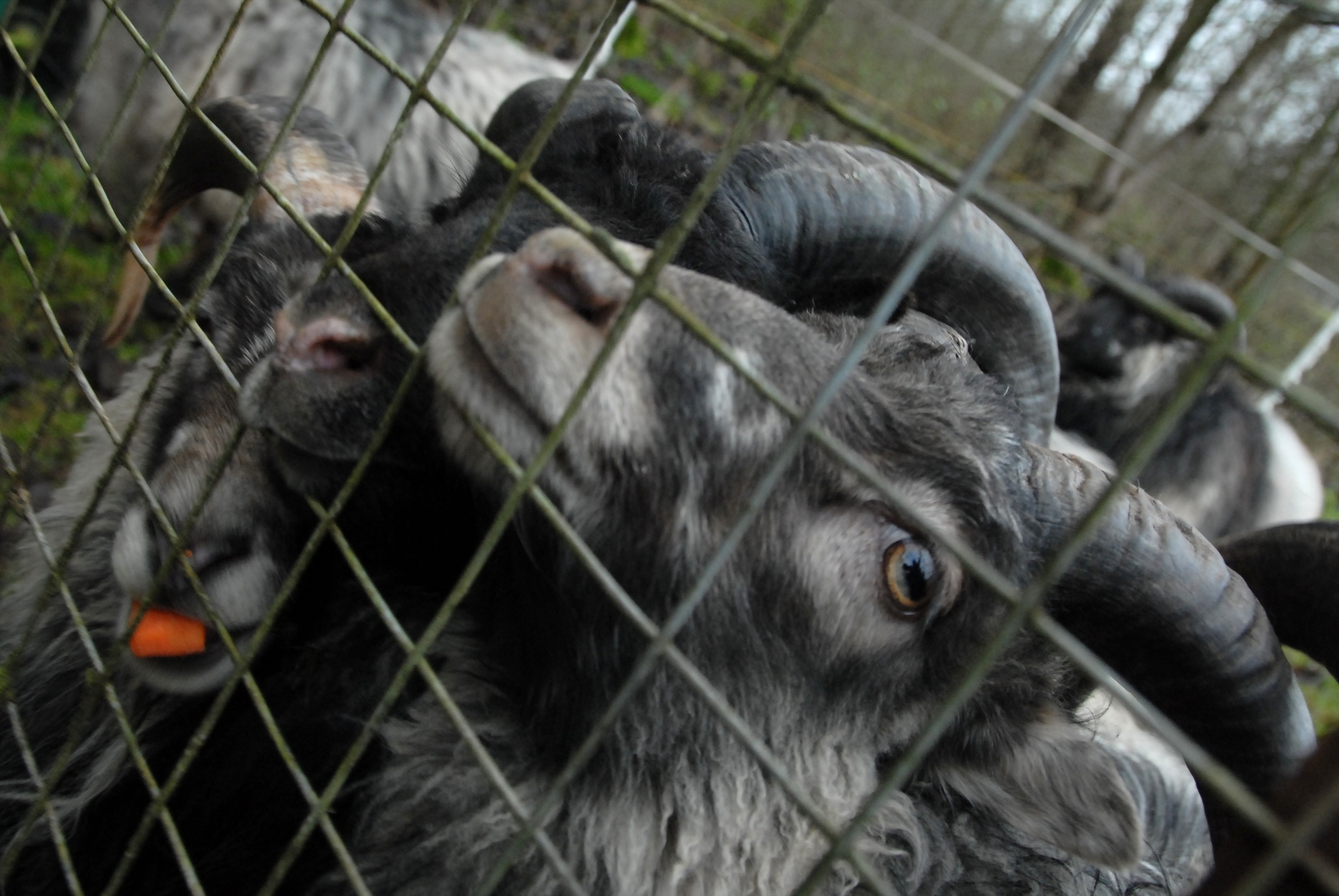
An example of the face of North Ronaldsay sheep

Despite their slight size, North Ronaldsay sheep were historically raised for their wool. It comes in a variety of colours and is very similar to the Shetland breed, due to their common ancestor. More common typical colours are the whites and greys, but browns, beiges, reds (also called tanay) and blacks, with coarser hair, are all exhibited. A full fleece weighs about 1 kg (2 lb).

The North Ronaldsay is a double-coated breed, meaning they have a wool undercoat and overcoat. The undercoat tends to be finer and soft, suitable for garments that would touch the skin, whereas the overcoat is coarser, with long hair that protects the sheep from the cold, wet weather of their natural environment. This fibre is more durable and tends to be used in overgarments.

== See also ==
- List of domesticated Scottish breeds
