= List of Scottish breeds =

This is a list of domestic animal breeds originating in Scotland. To be considered domesticated, a population of animals must have their behaviour, life cycle, or physiology systemically altered as a result of being under human control for many generations.

Scotland has produced some of the longest-established domestic animal breeds. There are thirty-seven extant animal breeds from Scotland, and three that are extinct. The Soay Sheep has prehistoric origins, and the Galloway breed of beef cattle dates back several hundred years. New breeds have also been developed more recently in Scotland, such as the Scottish Fold cat, which dates from 1961.

The North Ronaldsay Sheep is a most unusual breed, subsisting largely on a diet of seaweed. The Boreray was in 2012 the only sheep breed listed by the Rare Breeds Survival Trust as 'critical', its highest level of concern at that time; in 2022 it was listed as 'at risk', the lower of the two levels of concern of the Trust. Some breeds, such as the Shetland Pony and the Border Collie are well known throughout much of the Western world, whilst others such as the Scots Dumpy chicken are little-known, even at home. Fifteen breeds of dog have Scottish origins, including six terrier breeds. Indeed, the relative isolation of many Scottish islands has led to a preponderance of breeds from these places being represented. Various breeds are now extinct, including the Grice, an archaic and somewhat aggressive pig.

== Breeds ==
=== Cats ===
Breed	Image	Place and date of origin	Status
Scottish Fold		Coupar Angus, 1961	rare

=== Cattle ===
Breed	Image	Place and date of origin	Status
Aberdeen Angus		Aberdeenshire, Angus, 18th century	not at risk
Ayrshire		Ayrshire, before 1800	not at risk
Belted Galloway		Galloway, 17–18th century	rare
Galloway		Galloway, 700–1100	not at risk
Highland		West Highlands, before 1800	not at risk
Luing		Luing, after 1947	not at risk
Shetland		Shetland, 700–1100	at risk

=== Chickens ===
Breed	Image	Place and date of origin	Status
Scots Dumpy		Highlands, 11th century	priority; rare
Scots Grey		Lanarkshire, 16th century	priority; rare

=== Dogs ===
Breed	Image	Place and date of origin	Status
Bearded Collie		Highlands, 16th century	vulnerable native breed
Border Collie		Scottish Borders, late 19th century	not at risk
Border Terrier		Scottish Borders, 1700s	not at risk
Cairn Terrier		Scottish highlands, 16th–19th century	not at risk
Dandie Dinmont		Skye and Scottish Borders, mid-18th century or earlier	vulnerable native breed
Golden Retriever		Glen Affric, 1865	not at risk
Gordon Setter		Moray, 1700s	vulnerable native breed
Rough Collie		Scottish Highlands, 19th century	not at risk
Smooth Collie		Scotland, 19th century	vulnerable native breed
Scottish Terrier		Aberdeen, 15th–16th century	at risk
Scottish Deerhound		Probably the Highlands, possibly in the Middle Ages	vulnerable native breed
Shetland Sheepdog or Sheltie		1900s	not at risk
Skye Terrier		Skye, before 1588	vulnerable native breed
West Highland White Terrier or Westie		Skye & Argyll, 16th century	not at risk

=== Geese ===
Breed	Image	Place and date of origin	Status
Shetland		Shetland, unknown	UK and US - priority; critical

=== Horses ===
Breed	Image	Place and date of origin	Status
Clydesdale		Clydesdale, 1750s	at risk
Eriskay Pony		Hebrides	critical
Highland Pony		Highlands and Islands, 16th century	at risk
Shetland Pony		Shetland, B.C.	not at risk

=== Sheep ===
Breed	Image	Place and date of origin	Status
Boreray		St Kilda, Scotland, 1930s	critical
Castlemilk Moorit		Dumfriesshire, from more ancient Scottish and other breeds including Soay and Shetland, 1900s	critical
Cheviot		Scottish Borders, 14th century or earlier	not at risk
Hebridean		Cumbria, probably from sheep from the Hebrides, 19th century	rare
North Country Cheviot		Cheviot Hills, Caithness, Sutherland, 18th century	UK and North America
North Ronaldsay		North Ronaldsay, Iron Age	rare
Scottish Blackface		Scottish Borders, about 1500	not at risk
Shetland		Shetland, Iron Age	UK and North America
Soay		Soay, St Kilda, Neolithic or Bronze Age	rare

== Extinct breeds ==
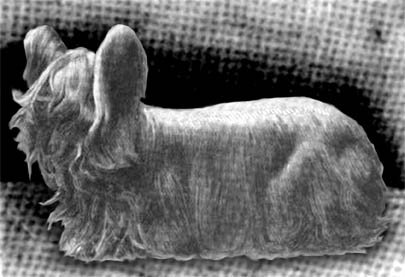
A Paisley Terrier

Prior to their demise, the Paisley Terrier contributed to the bloodline of the Yorkshire Terrier and the Scottish Tan Face to the Boreray sheep. Although Galloway Ponies were praised by Gervaise Markham in the 17th century for their "fine shape, easie pace, pure metall and infinit toughness", true to form Samuel Johnson described them as "common hackneys". It shares its origins with the still extant Fell Pony. A model of the Grice, whose habit of attacking lambs cannot have aided its survival, was recreated by a taxidermist in 2006.

Breed	Species	Date of Origin	Location of Origin	Date of extinction
Paisley Terrier or Clydesdale Terrier	Dog	19th century	Paisley, Clyde Valley	20th century
Galloway Pony	Horse	16th century or earlier	Galloway	post 1901
Grice	Pig	Unknown	Highlands and Islands (also Ireland)	c. 1930
Scottish Dunface or Old Scottish Shortwool	Sheep	Iron Age	Highlands and Islands (previously British Isles)	late 19th century (Survives as Shetland, Boreray, North Ronaldsay, Hebridean.)

== See also ==
- Fauna of Scotland
- Shetland animal breeds
- Scottish inventions and discoveries
