= Shetland (disambiguation) =

Shetland is an archipelago in Scotland.

Shetland may also refer to:

== Animals ==
- Shetland animal breeds, including:
  - Shetland cattle
  - Shetland goose
  - Shetland pony
  - Shetland sheep
  - Shetland Sheepdog

== Places ==
- Shetland, Ontario, Canada
- South Shetland Islands, a group of Antarctic islands

== Other uses ==
- Shetland Bus was the nickname of a clandestine special operations group that made a permanent link between Shetland, Scotland and German-occupied Norway from 1941 until 1945
- Shetland dialect, known as simply "Shetland" by locals
- Shetland (Scottish Parliament constituency)
- Shetland (TV series), a crime television drama airing on BBC1, set in the Shetland Islands
- Short Shetland, a 1940s British flying boat
