= Orkney and Shetland (disambiguation) =

Orkney and Shetland are two Scottish island groups collectively known as the Northern Isles.

Orkney and Shetland may also refer to:

- Orkney and Shetland (UK Parliament constituency)
- Orkney and Shetland (Parliament of Scotland constituency)
- The Orkney and Shetland Movement, a former electoral coalition

== See also ==
- Orkney (disambiguation)
- Shetland (disambiguation)
