= Shetland Sheepdog =

Scottish breed of dog

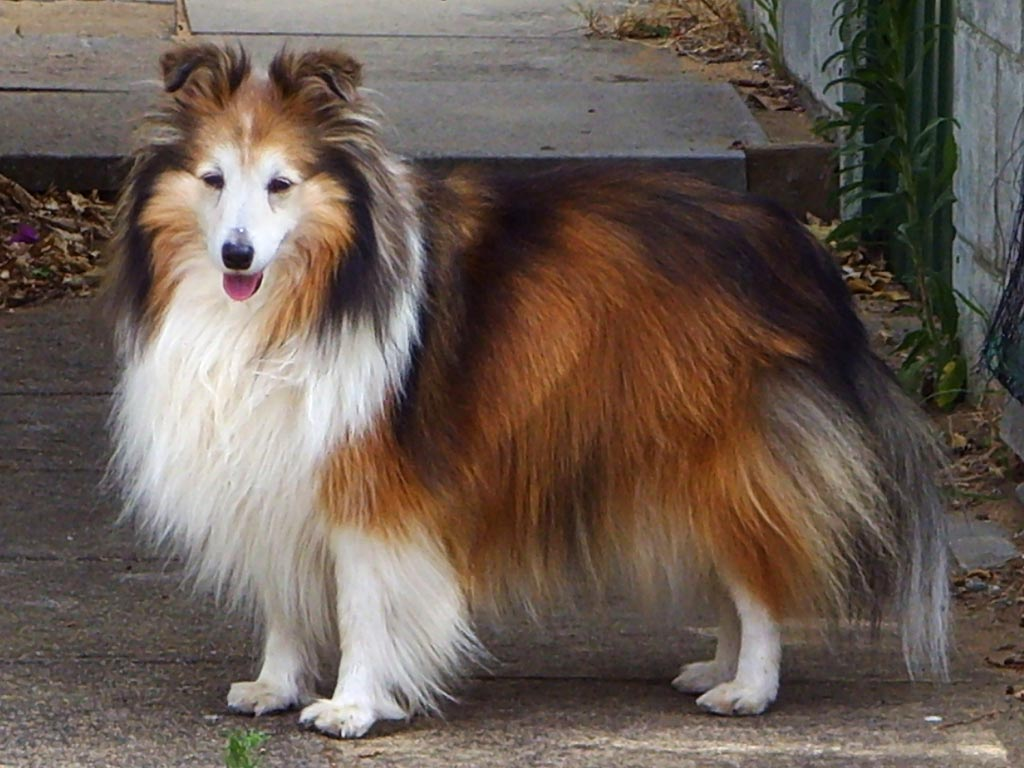
- Other names: Shetland Collie (obsolete); Dwarf Scotch Shepherd (obsolete)
- Common nicknames: Sheltie
- Origin: Scotland
Traits
Height	Males	34.5–39.5 cm (14–16 in)
	Females	33–38 cm (13–15 in)
- Coat: long, double
- Colour: sable; mahogany sable; shaded sable; tri-coloured; bi-black; bi-blue; blue merle; bi-blue merle; sable merle; colour-headed white; double merle; black-and-tan
- Litter size: 4-6
Kennel club standards
- KC: standard
- Fédération Cynologique Internationale: standard

The Shetland Sheepdog, also known as the Sheltie, is a breed of herding dog that originated in the Shetland Islands of Scotland. It was formally recognized by the Kennel Club in 1909. It was originally called the Shetland Collie, but this caused controversy amongst Rough Collie breeders of the time, so the name was changed. It is a small dog, clever, vocal, willing to please, and trustworthy.

Like the Shetland pony, Shetland cattle, and the Shetland sheep, the Shetland Sheepdog is a hardy but diminutive breed developed to thrive amidst the harsh and meagre conditions of its native islands. While the Shetland still excels at herding, today it is often raised as a working dog or family pet.

The Shetland's origins are obscure, but it is not a direct descendant of the Rough Collie, which it largely resembles. Rather, the Shetland is a descendant of small specimens of the Scottish Collie and the King Charles Spaniel. They were originally a small mixed-breed dog, often only about 20 to 30 centimetres (8 to 12 inches) in height at the shoulder, and it is thought that the original Shetland herding dogs were of the Spitz type, and were crossed with Collies from mainland Britain. In the early 20th century, James Loggie added a small Rough Collie to the breeding stock, and helped establish the breed that would become the modern Shetland Sheepdog.

== History ==
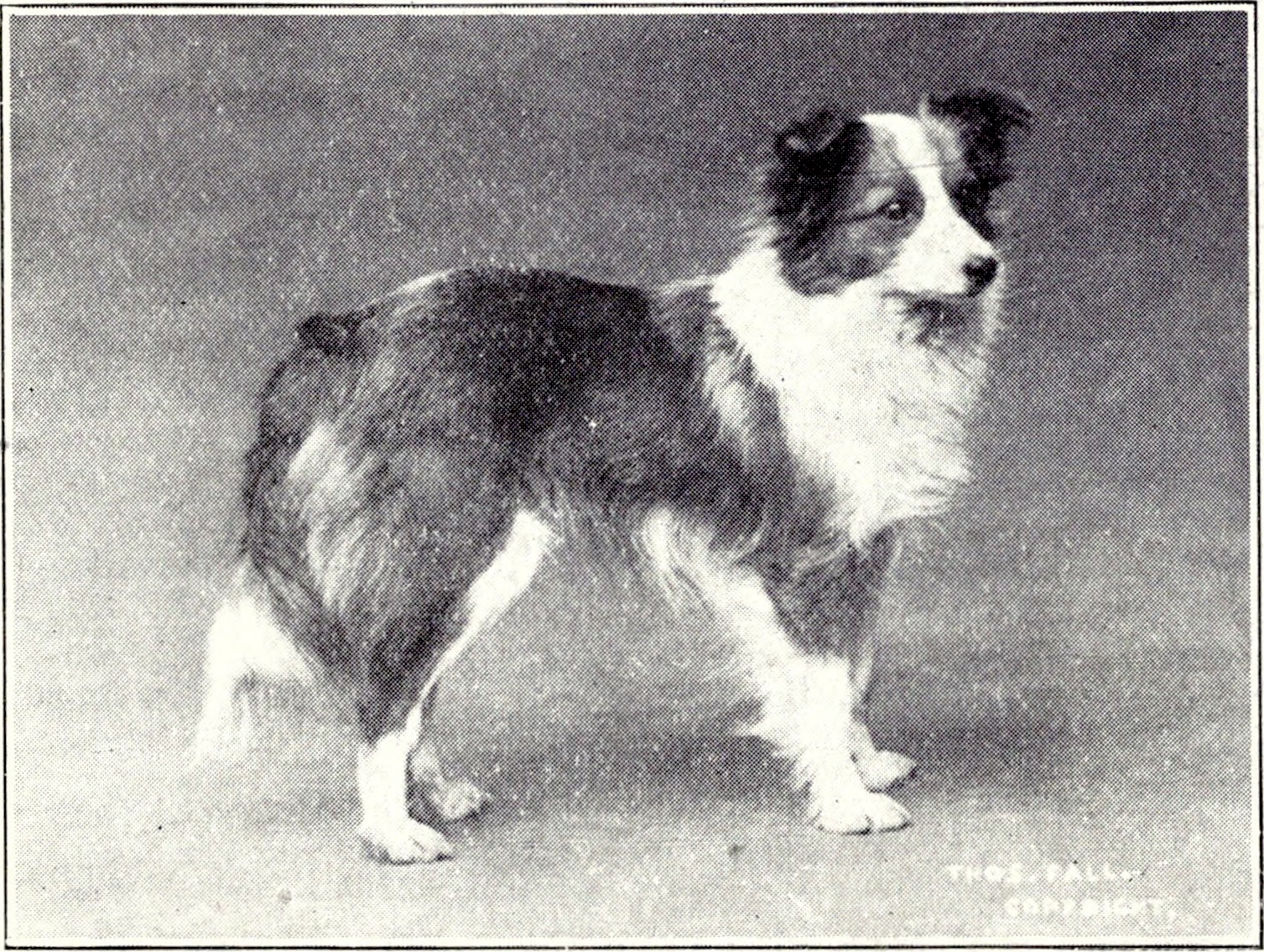
Photograph from 1915

Unlike many miniature breeds that resemble their larger counterparts, this breed was not developed simply by selectively breeding the Rough Collie for smaller and smaller size. The original sheepdog of Shetland was a Spitz-type dog, probably similar to the modern Icelandic Sheepdog. Strong evidence suggests that this dog was bred with the Yakki, an Icelandic dog that accompanied whalers from Greenland who landed in the ports of the island. The Yakki was about 14 inches (36 cm) in height and usually black with tan or white markings. Many of the early Shetlands were black and white or black and tan and this colouring can still be see in the muzzle of some sable dogs today whose muzzles are referred to as "smutty muzzles". Folk tales also mention a King Charles Spaniel that came from a yacht. Pomeranian dog ancestry is likely given the appearance of the breed. The first club for the breed called for a dog similar to the Rough Collie except in size, the standard called for dogs to be no taller than 15 inches (38 cm). Other clubs called for similar standards with the breed to essentially be a miniature. These standards led to people adding in collie blood to the breed to achieve said type. The Kennel Club originally refused to recognise the breed but later agreed to on the condition the name was changed from Shetland Collie due to opposition from collie breed clubs. The original Spitz-type working sheepdog of Shetland is now extinct, having been replaced for herding there by the Border Collie. Shetlands were used for herding until commercial livestock farming required larger breeds.

When the breed was originally introduced breeders called them Shetland Collies, which upset Rough Collie breeders, so the name was changed to Shetland Sheepdog. During the early 20th century (up until the 1940s), additional crosses were made to Rough Collies to help retain the desired Rough Collie type – in fact, the first English Shetland champion's dam, Gesta, was a rough Collie. The year 1909 marked the initial recognition of the Shetland by the English Kennel Club, with the first registered Shetland being a female called Badenock Rose. The first Shetland to be registered by the American Kennel Club was "Lord Scott" in 1911.

== Appearance ==
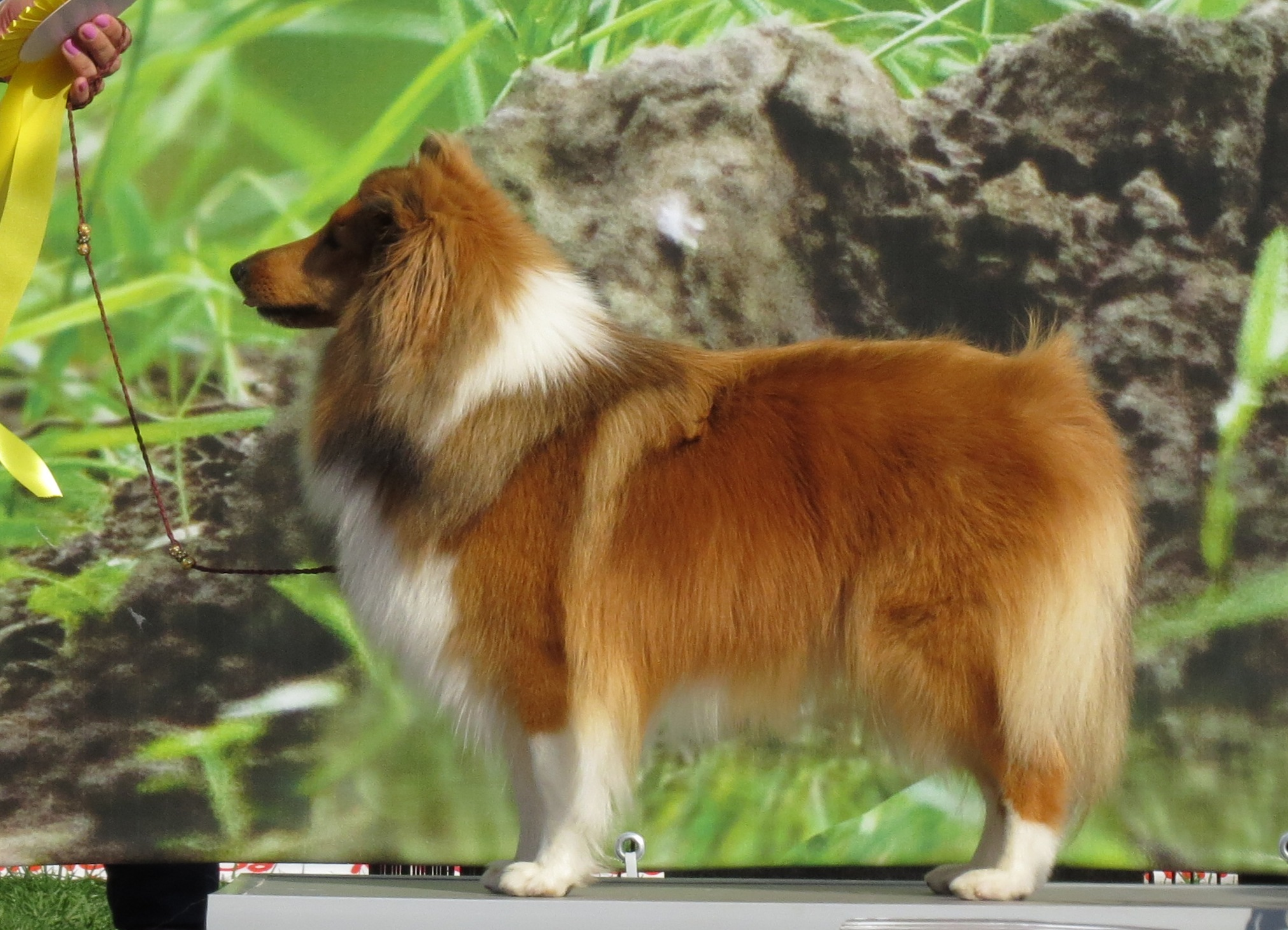
The sable

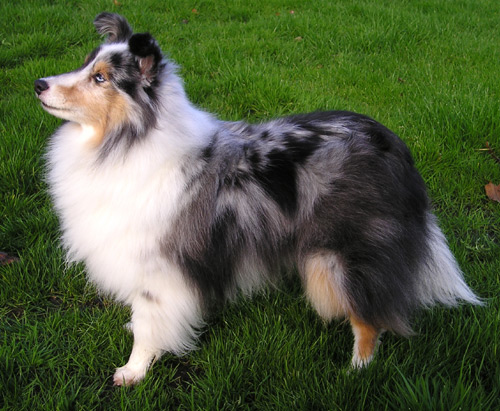
The blue merle

The general appearance of the Shetland is that of a miniature Rough Collie. They are a small and double coated dog with a well shaped head. They have a long coat which becomes short around the face giving it the appearance of a mane.

=== Coat and colours ===
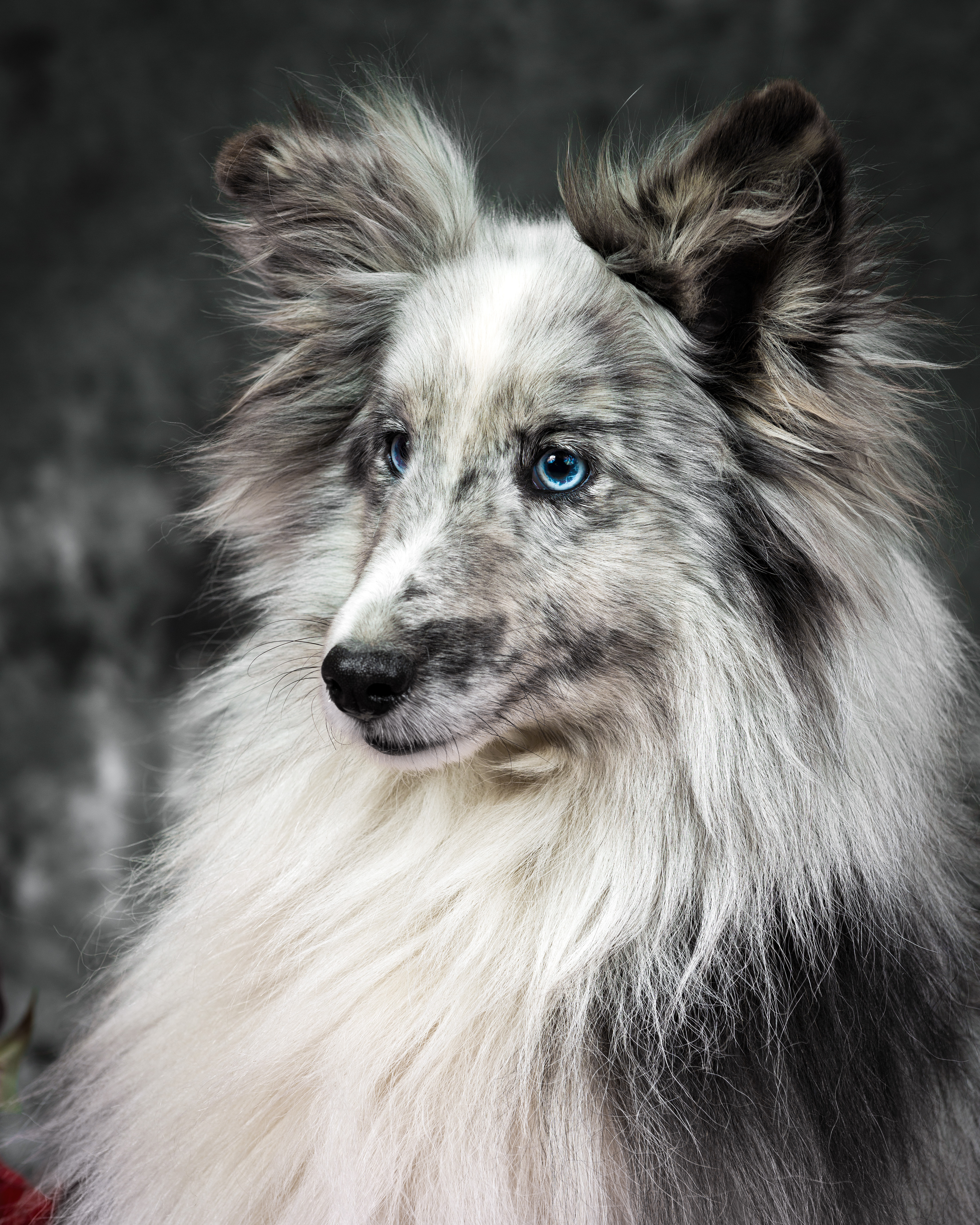
The bi-blue, with blue eyes caused by the merle factor

Shetlands have a double coat, which means that they have two layers of fur that make up their coat. The outer coat is made up of long hair and is "harsh-textured and straight". The undercoat is soft, short, and close to the skin. The long coat should produce the appearance of a mane. The face is smooth haired.

Shetlands may come in the following colours.

- Sable – either clear or shaded sable ranging in colour from pale gold to mahogany. Wolf-sable and grey are undesirable colours.
- Tricolor – with intense black on the body and rich tan markings preferred.
- Blue merle – silvery blue with splashed and marbled black preferred. General effect of the coat must be blue. Rich tan markings are also preferred but there is no penalty for the absence of this. Strong black markings, slate or rusty tinges in the coat are highly undesirable.
- Black and white & black and tan – White markings may appear on any coat besides black and tan but patches on the body are undesirable.

=== Height ===
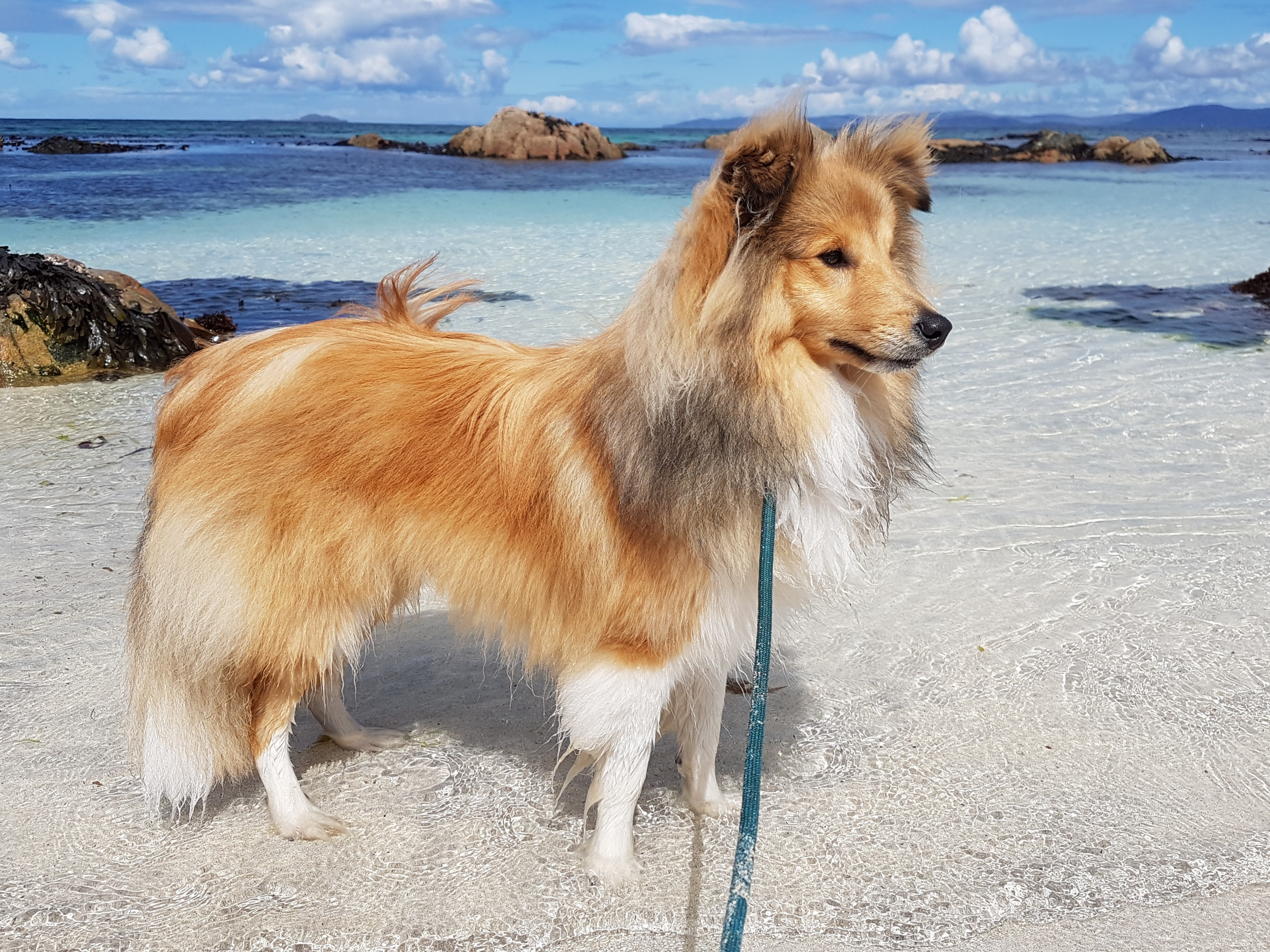
A 12-month-old Sheltie on Mull

The ideal height at the withers is 14 1/2 inches (37 cms) for dogs and 14 inches (35.5 cm) for bitches. More than 1 inch (2.5 cm) in variation from these heights is undesirable.

=== Ears ===
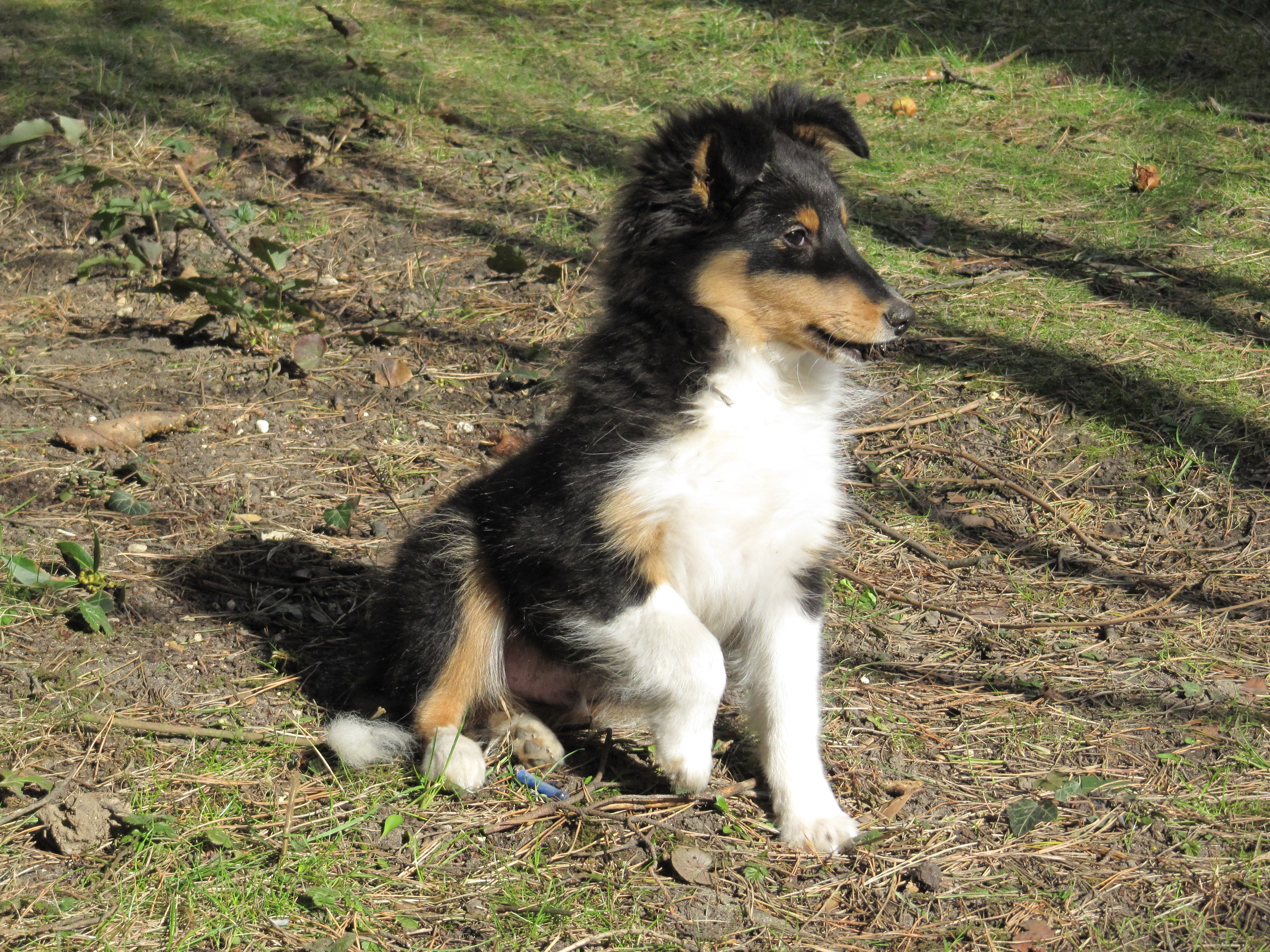
A tri-colour puppy

The Shetland's ears are small and of moderate width at the base placed close on top of the head. When alert the ears are semi-erect and propped forward.

=== Eyes ===
Eyes are of medium size and are almond shaped. Eyes are always dark brown except in dogs with merle coats where one or both of the eyes may be blue.

=== Head ===
The head is refined without any exaggerations. The head has a long wedge tapering from the ears to nose. The occipital bone isn't prominent. The cheeks are flat to support a well rounded muzzle. The muzzle is of equal length to the skull, dividing at the corner of the eye. The mucocutaneous parts of the face are black in pigmentation.

=== Body ===
Neck is well arched and muscular. Legs are muscular. The dog is slightly longer than it is tall with a deep chest.

== Temperament ==
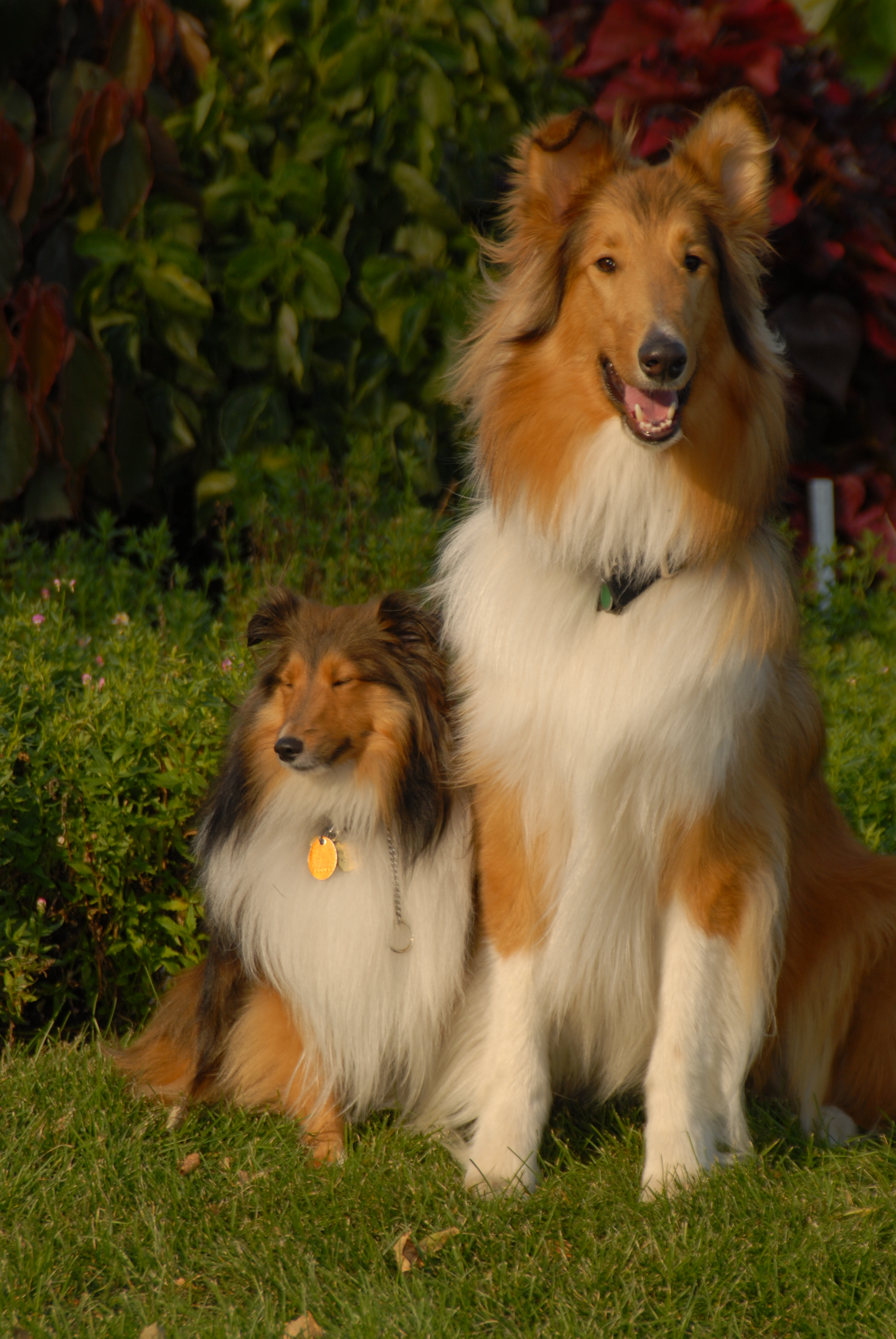
Apart from their size difference, Shetlands and Rough Collies look very much alike.

In 1995, Stanley Coren, a researcher on canine intelligence, found the Shetland Sheepdog to be one of the brightest dogs, ranking 6th out of 138 breeds tested. His research found that an average Shetland could understand a new command in fewer than five repetitions and would obey a command the first time it was given either at or above 95% of the time.

== Health ==
A Japanese study of pet cemetery data found a life expectancy of 14.3 years with 239 dogs—higher than 13.7 overall life expectancy. A UK study found a life expectancy of 13.4 years for the breed compared to an average of 12.7 for purebreeds and 12 for crossbreeds.

The Shetland is predisposed to the following dermatological conditions: allergic skin disease, cutaneous drug eruptions, cutaneous histiocytosis, cutaneous or systemic lupus, dermatomyositis, and Sertoli cell tumour.

Shetland Sheepdogs have four times the risk of other dogs of developing transitional cell carcinoma, a cancer of the bladder.

A North American study of over a million hip scores in dogs over the age of two found the Shetland to have the fifth-lowest prevalence out of sixty breeds—4.2% of Shetlands had hip dysplasia.

Von Willebrand disease is an inherited bleeding disorder. The Shetland is affected by both type I and type III.

Collie eye anomaly is an autosomal recessive inherited trait which results in incomplete closure of the embryonic fissure, seen almost exclusively in Collies, Border Collies and Shetland Sheepdogs.

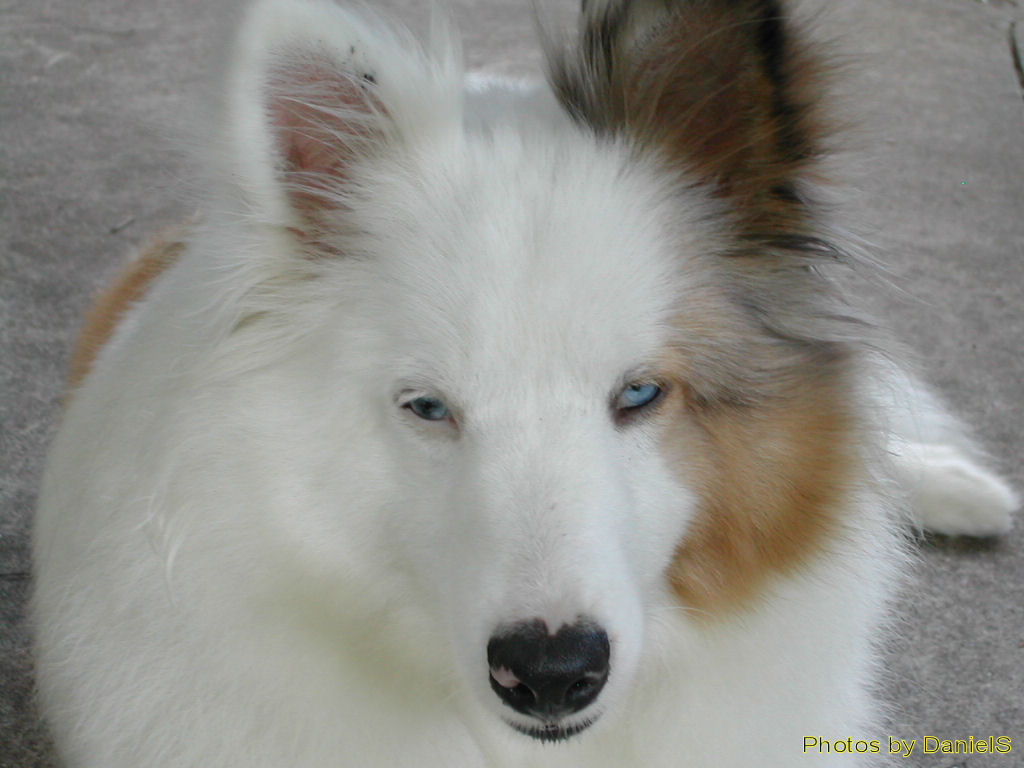
This mostly white Shetland has several conformational faults, such as pricked ears, too much white colouration (due to it being a double merle), microphthalmia, and pink spots in the nose. This dog would not be considered breeding stock.

A mutation the MDR1 gene causes sensitivity to certain drugs such as ivermectin. This sensitivity has been observed in the Shetland. The MDR1 mutation has been identified in the Shetland and the breed was identified as predisposed in a study in the US. Due to this genetic mutation, affected dogs may exhibit sensitivity or adverse reactions to many drugs, including acepromazine, butorphanol, doxorubicin, erythromycin, ivermectin, loperamide, milbemycin, moxidectin, rifampin, selamectin, vinblastine, and vincristine.

Ulcerative dermatosis of Shetland sheepdog and rough collie (UDSSC) is a disease that is believed to be a vesicular variant of discoid lupus erythematosus. It is an ulcerative dermatosis that affects the thigh, groin, axillae, and ventral abdomen.

A UK study found a significant predisposition to gall bladder mucocele, with the breed being 93.87 times more likely to acquire the condition than other dogs. A study looking at the increased incidence of hepatobiliary disease in the Shetland Sheepdog found that an insertion mutation of the ABCB4 gene that occurs in the Shetland Sheepdog—as well as other breeds—had a significant association with gall bladder mucocele prevalence.

== Working life ==
As the name suggests, Shetland Sheepdogs can and have been used as sheepdogs, and they still participate in sheepdog trials.

=== Activities ===
In their size group, the breed dominates dog agility, obedience, showmanship, flyball, tracking, and herding. Herding instincts and trainability can be measured at noncompetitive herding tests. Shetlands exhibiting basic herding instincts can be trained to compete in herding trials.

== Famous Shetland Sheepdogs ==
- Ch Halstor's Peter Pumpkin ROM – The Shetland sheepdog sire with the most Champions (160).
- Badenock Rose – the first Shetland sheepdog registered with the English Kennel Club.
- Mickey – main character of Canadian children's series Mickey's Farm

== See also ==
- Shetland animal breeds
