= Scots Dumpy =

Scottish breed of creeper chicken

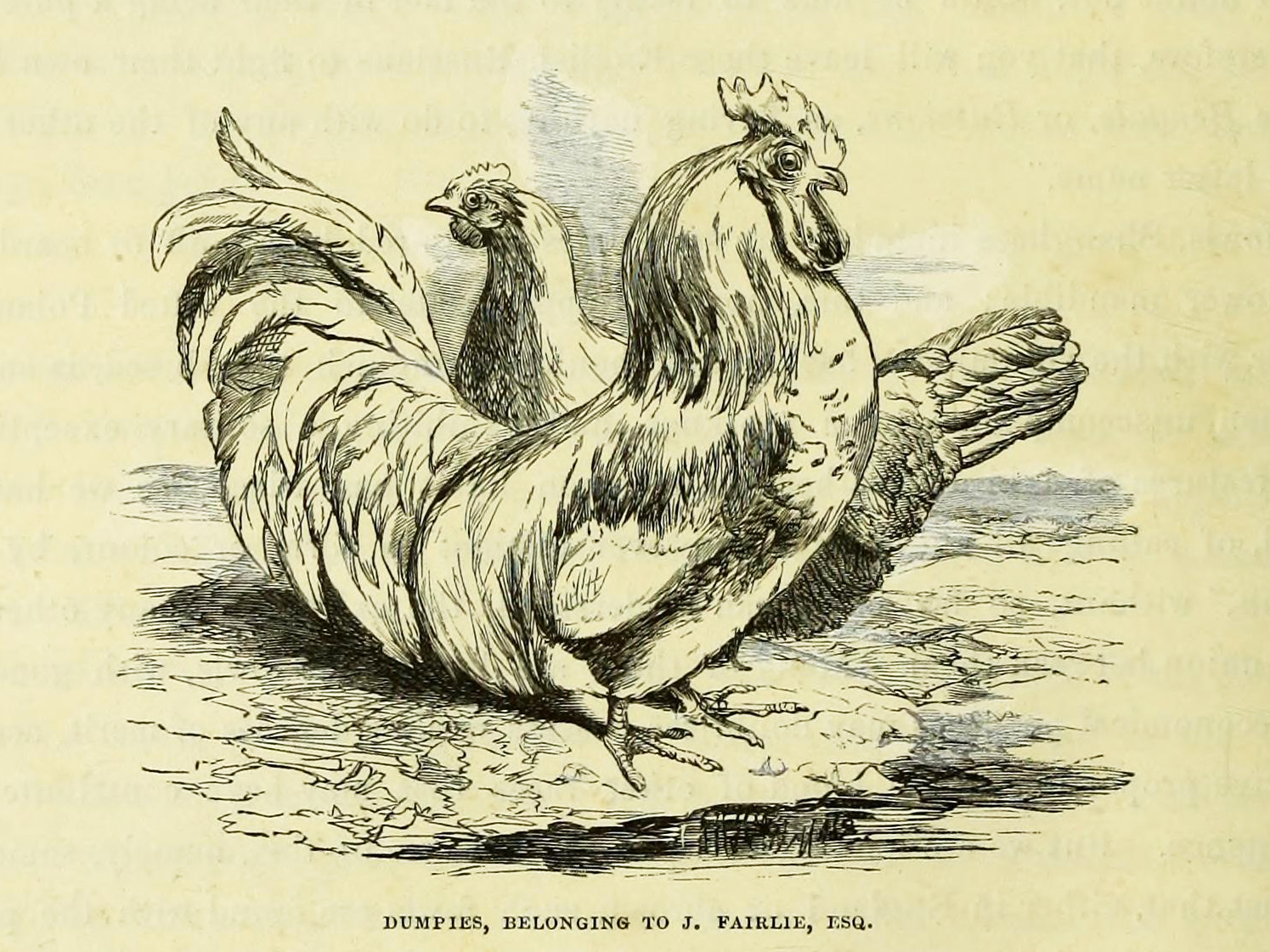
- Dumpies at the Metropolitan Poultry Show in Baker Street, London, Christmas 1852; wood engraving from: William Wingfield, The Poultry Book, 1853
- Conservation status: FAO (2007, bantam): critical; RBST (2009): at risk; DAD-IS (2025, large fowl): unknown; DAD-IS (2025, bantam): unknown
- Other names: Bakie; Corlaigh; Crawler; Creeper; Scotch Bakie; Stumpy
- Country of origin: Scotland
- Standard: PCGB
- Use: show; meat

Traits
- Weight: Male: standard: 3.2 kg; bantam: 800 g; Female: standard: 2.7 kg; bantam: 675 g
- Egg colour: white or cream-coloured

Classification
- EE: not recognised
- PCGB: soft feather: light
- Chicken; Gallus gallus domesticus

The Scots Dumpy is a traditional Scottish breed of chicken. It is characterised by very short legs, so short that the body is a few centimetres from the ground; as in other breeds of creeper chicken, this chondrodystrophy is caused by a recessive lethal allele. The Dumpy has at times been known by other names, among them Bakie, Corlaigh, Crawler, Creeper and Stumpy. There are both standard-sized and bantam Scots Dumpies. It is one of two Scottish breeds of chicken, the other being the Scots Grey.

== History ==
The Scots Dumpy is a traditional Scottish breed; short-legged birds of this type have been bred in Scotland for more than two centuries. Some were introduced to England in the mid-nineteenth century, and were first shown at the Metropolitan Poultry Exhibition in Baker Street in London in 1852. In 1854 John Fairlie of Cheveley Park in Cambridgeshire showed some at the Cheltenham Poultry Show in Cheltenham. It later became one of the rarest British breeds. In 1975 a search for surviving stock in Scotland was unsuccessful. Two years later a dozen birds were imported from Kenya, descendants of a small flock taken there in 1902 in the dowry of Violet Mabel Carnegie, and used to re-constitute the breed.

In 2009 it was listed by the Rare Breeds Survival Trust as "at risk", the lowest of the four levels of endangerment the trust assigned to poultry at that time.

No population data for either the large fowl or the bantam Dumpy has been reported to DAD-IS since 2002; in 2025 the conservation status of both was unknown.

== Characteristics ==
There is no set colour for the Scots Dumpy, which is usually cuckoo, black or white; the breed standard allows any colour standardised in other breeds. The comb is single and bright red. The ear-lobes are small, the wattles of medium size; they and the face are also bright red. (Note: The earlobes are described as white in a description from 1854.) The eyes are red in the white and cuckoo varieties, dark in the black.

The legs are abnormally short, the shanks no longer than 3.75 cm (1.5 in), so the birds have an unusual waddling or swimming gait. They are otherwise normal in all respects, with a long heavy low-set body, deep breast, broad back, and well-arched tail. They have four toes.

== Use ==
Scots Dumpy hens lay about 180 white or cream-coloured eggs per year. They are good sitters, and have been used to hatch clutches of game-bird eggs.
