= Ossabaw Island Hog =

Breed of swine

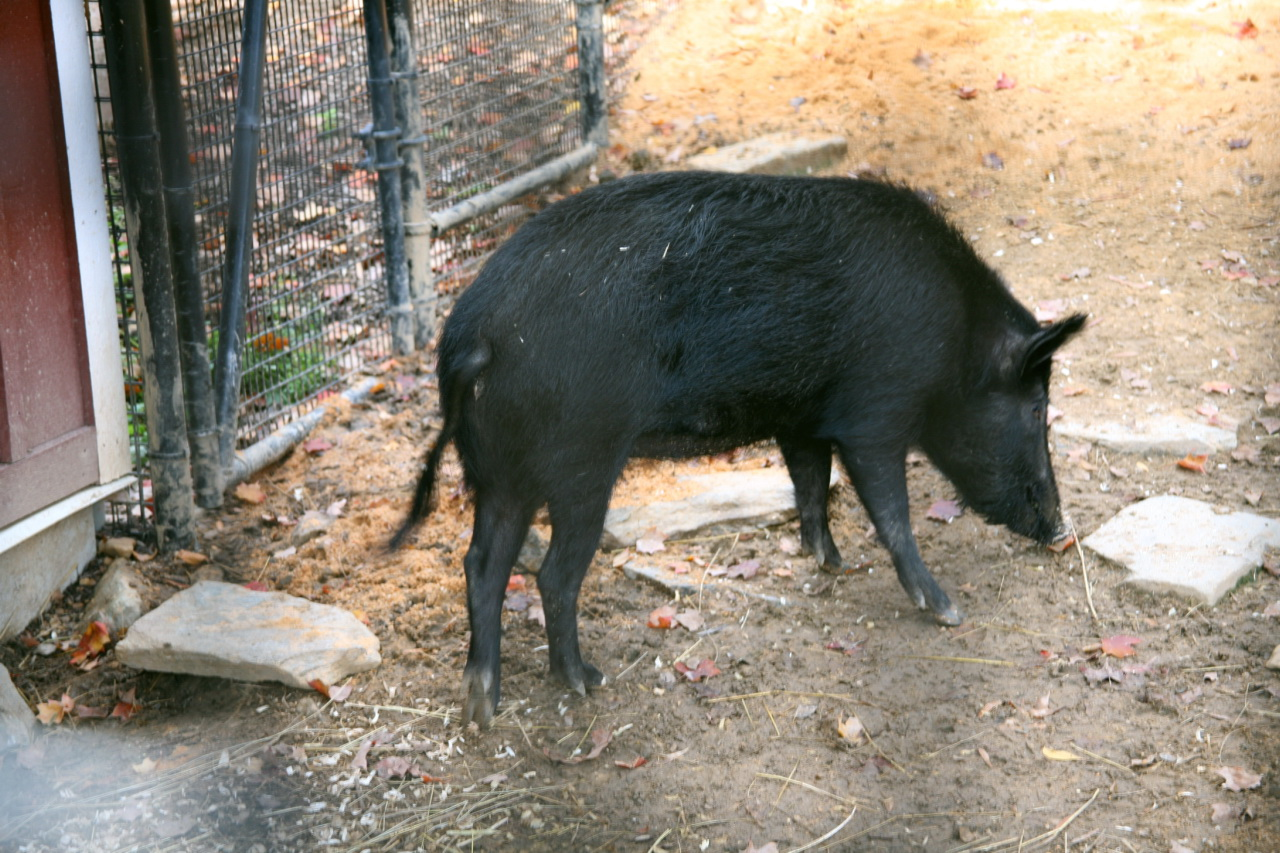
- An Ossabaw hog at the National Zoo in Washington D.C.
- Conservation status: Critical
- Other names: Ossabaw Island
- Country of origin: Ossabaw Island USA

Traits
- Weight: Male: Under 200 pounds (90 kg); Female: Under 200 pounds (90 kg)

The Ossabaw Island Hog or Ossabaw Island is a breed of pig derived from a population of feral pigs on Ossabaw Island, Georgia, United States. The original Ossabaw hogs are descended from swine released on the island in the 16th century by Spanish explorers. A breeding population has been established on American farms off the island, but they remain a critically endangered variety of pig.

== History ==
As the Spanish explored the coast of the Americas in the 16th century, livestock such as pigs were often left on islands as a future food source. This was the origin of the pigs that would become the Ossabaw breed. Over the following hundreds of years, the population of these feral pigs remained isolated on Ossabaw, which is one of the Sea Islands, barrier islands off the Georgia coast, and there was very little introduction of other domestic breeds. Since 1978 the island has been owned by the State and managed by the Georgia Department of Natural Resources (DNR) as a preserve.

The human population of the island was never high, and the pigs generally ranged freely over its entire acreage. Like feral pigs elsewhere in the world, those on Ossabaw have had an adverse effect on native habitat and species. The pigs are highly omnivorous, and will consume everything from roots and tubers to small reptiles and mammals. Ossabaw hogs have even been observed feeding on white-tailed deer entrails.

Ossabaw Island hogs have been documented as having a negative impact on endangered species such as the loggerhead sea turtle and snowy plover, disturbing nests and eating eggs. This, plus the varied other impacts they have on the ecosystem, have convinced the Georgia DNR to recommend the eradication of feral swine via trapping, shooting and hunting by the public.

Aside from the environmental concerns posed by Ossabaw Island hogs, they are also recognized as a unique genetic resource by scientists and breed conservationists. They are thought to be the only U.S. breed which is descended from the Iberian-type pigs brought to North America by the Spanish. A very small breeding population of Ossabaw hogs are kept off the island by farmers who market them as a form of heritage pork, and there are also herds at several zoos and farms, at Mount Vernon, Colonial Williamsburg, National Colonial Farm at Piscataway Park in Accokeek, Maryland, Conner Prairie Interactive History Park in Fishers, Indiana, and Barrington Living History Farm in Washington, Texas. Captive breeding populations were also previously kept by a few American universities for scientific study and conservation, but these herds were dissolved and have not contributed to the current bloodlines of Ossabaw hogs on the mainland today.

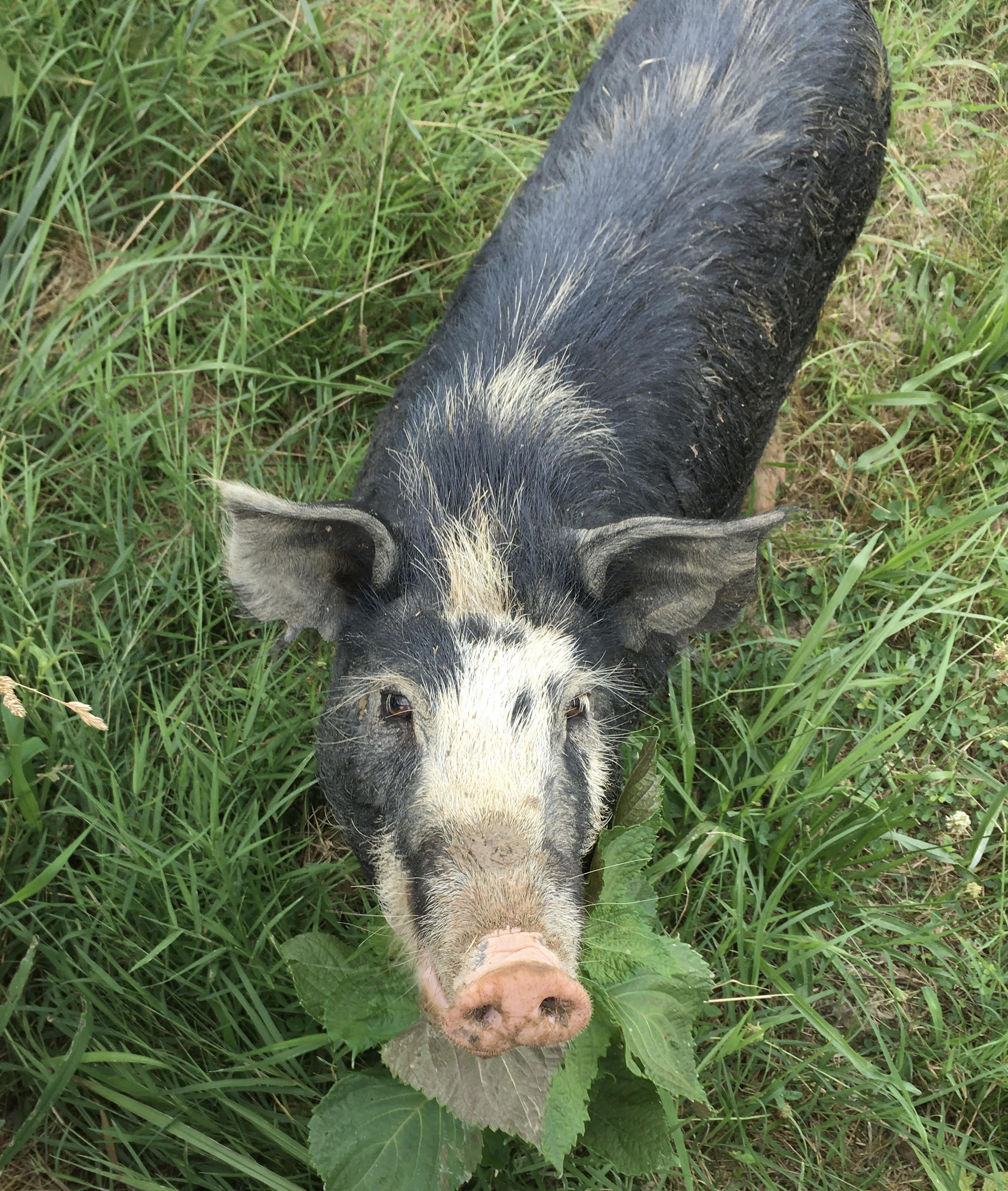
A young Ossabaw Island Hog at the Accokeek Foundation

Both the island and mainland populations continue to be considered vulnerable by the American Livestock Breeds Conservancy (ALBC), Slow Food USA, and others. The breed is listed as "critical" on the priority list of the ALBC, and is also included in Slow Food's Ark of Taste, a catalog of heritage foods in danger of extinction.

The population on the island is currently controlled by the methods advised by the DNR, and it is unclear how much longer the population will avoid eradication entirely. Due to the presence of vesicular stomatitis and pseudorabies on the island, no more live pigs may be removed from the island. The mainland U.S. population kept by farmers is preserved because of interest from the sustainable agriculture movement.

== Characteristics ==
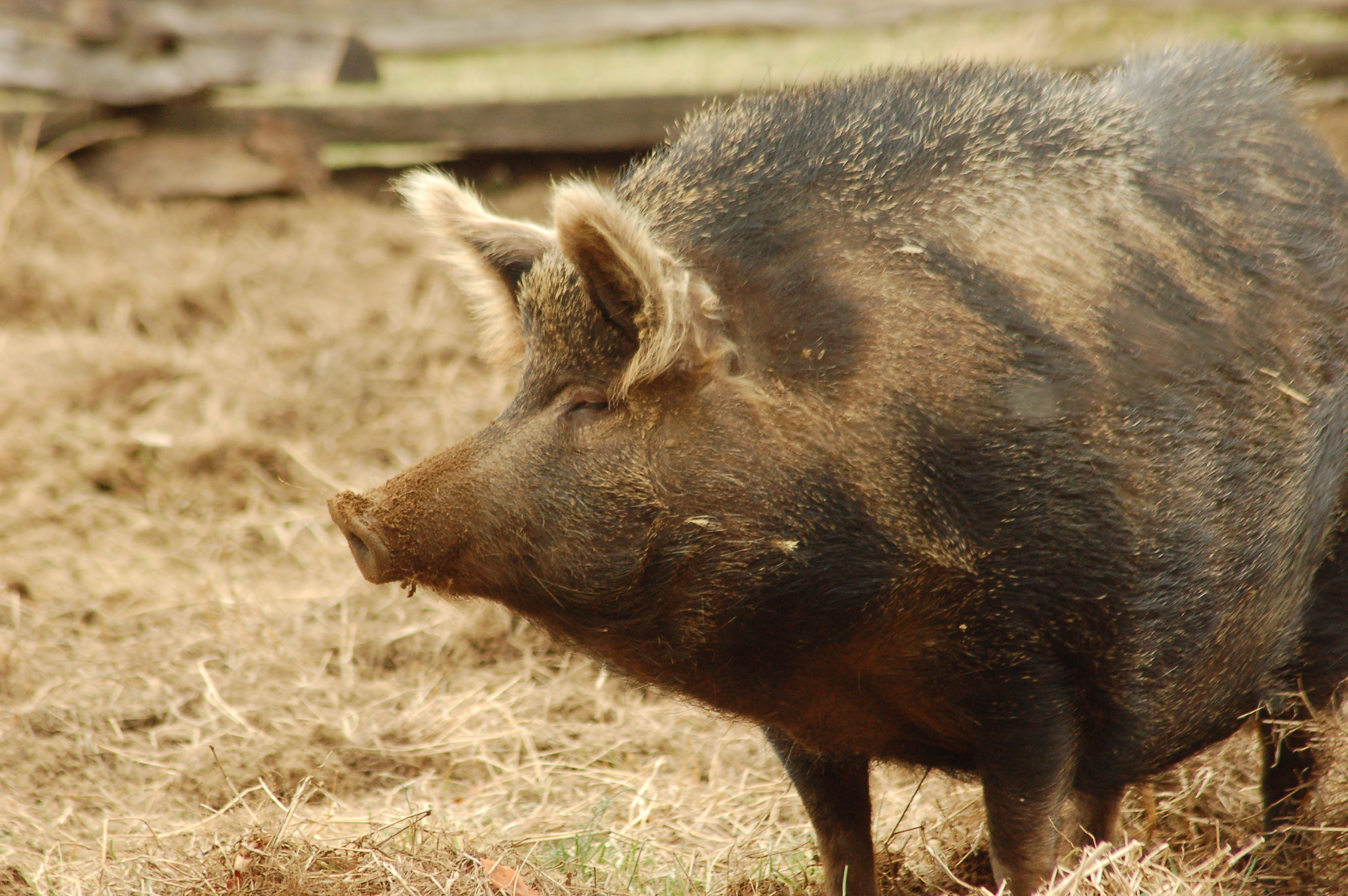
An Ossabaw Island hog with a spotted coat

The breed characteristics of Ossabaw Island hogs in both phenotype and genotype have been shaped by the pressures of feral life in an island habitat. They are small swine, less than 20 inches (510 mm) tall and weighing less than 200 pounds (90 kg) at maturity. This size is partly due to the phenomenon of insular dwarfism, and individuals kept in off-island farms may grow slightly larger in successive generations. They are also hardy and very good foragers, making them useful in extensive farming (as opposed to intensive pig farming).

Ossabaw hogs appear in a wide range of colors, with the most common being black and a spotted variety. Ossabaw piglets do not show the striping that wild boars do, and because of their isolation on the island they are not hybridized, as the razorback may be. They additionally have long snouts, upright ears, and a heavy coat of bristles compared to other pig breeds. Ossabaws are noted to be intelligent and to have a friendly temperament.

As a result of life on an island where the abundance and scarcity of food is seasonally variable, Ossabaw hogs store fat in a different manner than most domestic pigs and have a "thrifty gene". In conditions with constant supplies of food (such as on farms and in the laboratory) they accrue more fat than other pigs and may develop a "prediabetes" condition. Because this trait makes them useful as a model organism, scientific studies on metabolic syndrome and Type II diabetes have been conducted on the Ossabaw hog. Ossabaw hogs also have adapted to the high salt diets and minimal availability of fresh water on the island.

The meat of Ossabaws is dark, with a unique texture, and is prized for resembling the jamón ibérico of the black Iberian pig. It is considered to be an artisanal, heritage product especially well-suited to use in cured meats and whole pig roasts.

== See also ==
- List of domestic pig breeds
- Grice - an extinct pig from Shetland
