= Grice =

Breed of pig

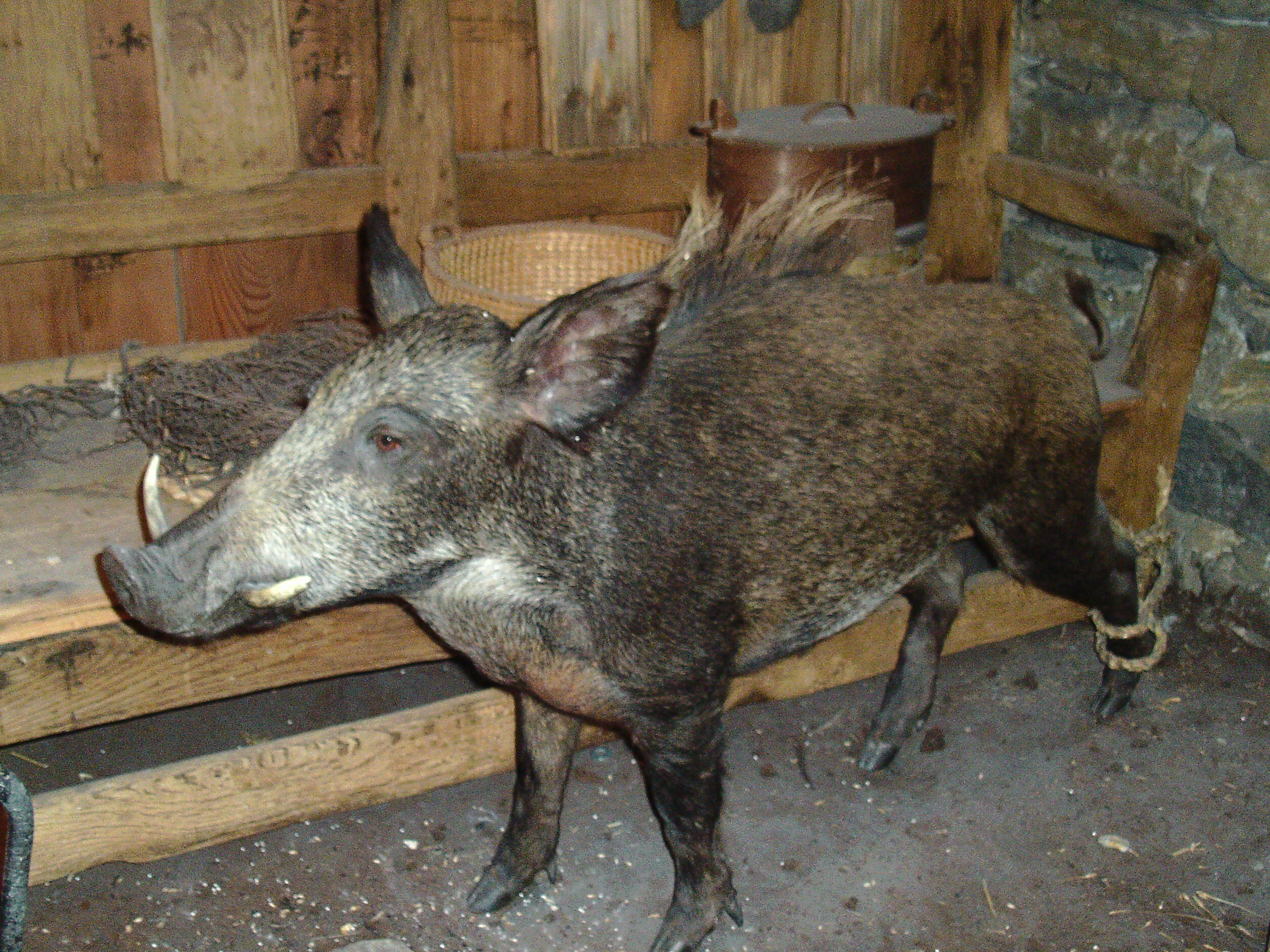
- A reconstruction of a grice
- Conservation status: Extinct
- Other names: Highland; Hebridean; Irish
- Country of origin: Scotland

Traits

The grice was a breed of swine found in the Highlands and Islands of Scotland and in Ireland. It became extinct, surviving the longest in the Shetland Isles, where it disappeared sometime between the middle of the 19th century and the 1930s. It was also known as the Highland, Hebridean or Irish pig, or the gryss or gussie.

== Etymology ==
"Grice" is a Scots and northern English dialect word originally meaning "young pig" (compare the Scandinavian gris, meaning "pig").

== History ==
Accounts from the early 19th century suggest the grice was an aggressive animal with small tusks, an arched back, and a coat of stiff, dark bristles over a wiry, woollen fleece. Highland examples were described as "a small, thin-formed animal, with bristles standing up from nose to tail". Like other livestock in these areas, the grice was small and hardy, able to survive the harsh environmental conditions. Highland grice foraged for berries on moorland.

Most Shetland crofts would have at least one grice kept on grazing lands, but they would often roam across adjacent farmland, rooting up crops and occasionally killing and eating newborn lambs. According to geologist Samuel Hibbert, who wrote an account of the islands in 1822, although the grice was "small and scrawny", its meat made "excellent hams" when cured. Islanders also made footballs from grice bladder, and even windowpanes from their intestines, by stretching the membrane over a wooden frame until it was sufficiently thin to allow light to pass through. The animal's bristles were used as thread for sewing leather and for making ropes. However useful the animals no doubt were, neighbours were constantly grumbling about the behaviour of their neighbours' grice, and the courts were empowered to confiscate particularly troublesome ones or fine their owners.

In the 19th century, landowners discouraged the keeping of these swine (one agricultural writer commented, "it is voracious in the extreme, and excessively difficult to confine in pasture or to fatten; it is also destructive and mischievous, and therefore ought gradually to be extirpated"). This, combined with the increasing import of other breeds from the Scottish mainland, resulted in a dwindling grice population, and sometime between the middle of the 19th century and the 1930s the breed was extinct. Grice's legacy remains in the wild bulb Scilla verna, known locally as "grice's onions" because it was a favourite food of the swine.

In 2006, curators at the Shetland Museum and Archives commissioned a taxidermist to recreate a grice from the stuffed body of an immature wild boar. As no one alive had seen a grice, the accuracy of the model relied on descriptions in "published sources ... investigated artefact and archaeological findings". The model grice went on public display in spring 2007.

In 2020 a skull was discovered in Nesting that may be the first recorded full grice skull specimen. Some doubt has been cast over the skull's origin due to the shorter than expected length of the snout; as of August 2020 verification is in progress.

== See also ==
- Scottish pork taboo
- Shetland animal breeds
- Shetland pony
- List of Scottish breeds
- Ossabaw Island hog
