= Smooth Collie =

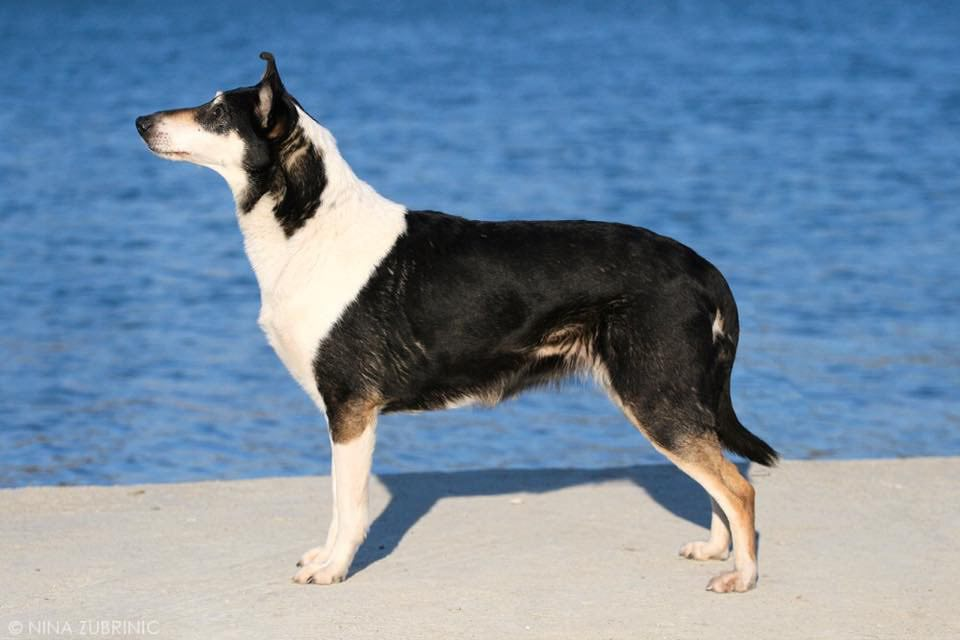
- A tri-coloured Smooth Collie
- Other names: Collie (Smooth)
- Origin: Scotland
Kennel club standards
- KC: standard
- Fédération Cynologique Internationale: standard

The Smooth Collie is a breed of dog developed originally for herding. It is a short-coated version of the Rough Collie of Lassie fame. Some breed organisations consider the smooth-coat and rough-coat dogs to be variations of the same breed.

== History ==
The early history of the Smooth Collie, like that of many dog breeds, is a matter of speculation. Even the origin of the breed's name is unclear, variously claimed to describe the early shepherd dog's dark colour ("coaly") or derived from the name of a breed of sheep with black faces once commonly kept in Scotland ("Colley") or derived from an Anglo-Saxon word meaning "useful." The word could also trace to Gaelic or/and Irish - in which the words for "doggie" are, respectively, càilean and coileán. This would be more consistent with the breed's origin in the Gaelic-speaking Scottish Highlands than an Anglo-Saxon term.

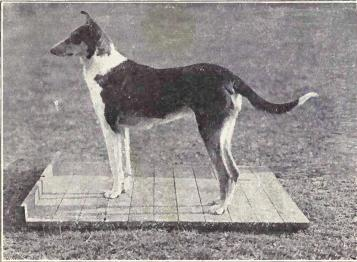
Smooth Collie circa 1915

The modern history of both the Smooth and Rough Collie began in the reign of Queen Victoria, who became interested in the shepherds' dogs while at Balmoral Castle in Scotland. In 1860, she purchased some of the dogs for her own kennel. With the Queen's interest, it became fashionable to own Smooth Collies. Thus began the breed's transformation from working farm dog, similar to the modern Border Collie, to the dog bred as a pet and for the sport of conformation showing that we know today.

The smooth and rough are classified as separate breeds in some countries, such as the United Kingdom and Australia. The latter is a fairly recent development, however, with the Kennel Club (UK) allowing the interbreeding of the two varieties until 1993. The Smooth Collie today is considered a variety of the same breed as the Rough Collie in the United States, Canada, meaning that they can interbreed and some statistics are kept only for "Collie" rather than for both varieties individually.

A breed society, the Smooth Collie Club of Great Britain, was established in 1955. The breed was definitively accepted by the Fédération Cynologique Internationale in 1974.

== Characteristics ==
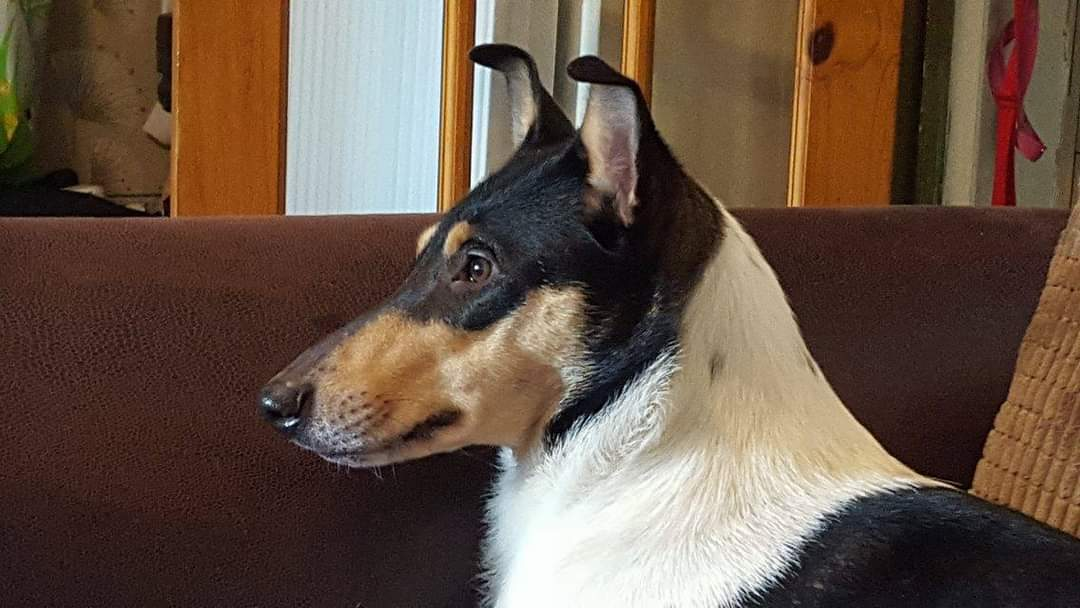
Tricolour, head

The Smooth Collie is of medium to large size: dogs stand some 56–61 cm (22–24 in) at the withers, bitches about 5 cm (2 in) less; weights are in the range 18–25 kg (40–55 lb) for bitches and about 21–30 kg (45–65 lb) for dogs.

It is slightly longer than it is tall, with a level back and a deep chest. The features of the head, particularly the "sweet" expression, are considered very important in the show ring. The breed has a long muzzle, flat skull, and semi-erect ears.

The outer coat is flat, short and harsh-textured, the undercoat soft and dense. Three coat colours are recognised: sable (sand-colour, ranging from pale gold to rich mahogany); tricolour (mostly black, with tan and white markings); and blue merle (silvery grey marbled with black, with or without tan markings), all marked with white areas on the chest, neck, feet, legs and tip of the tail.

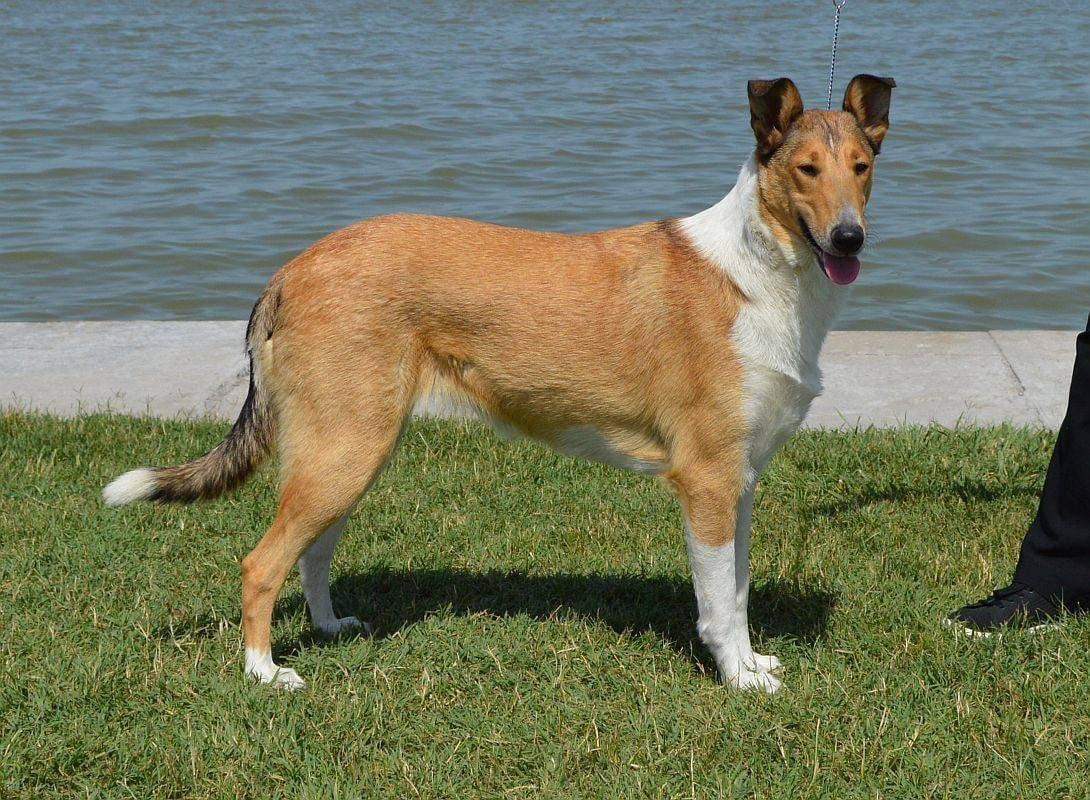
The sable

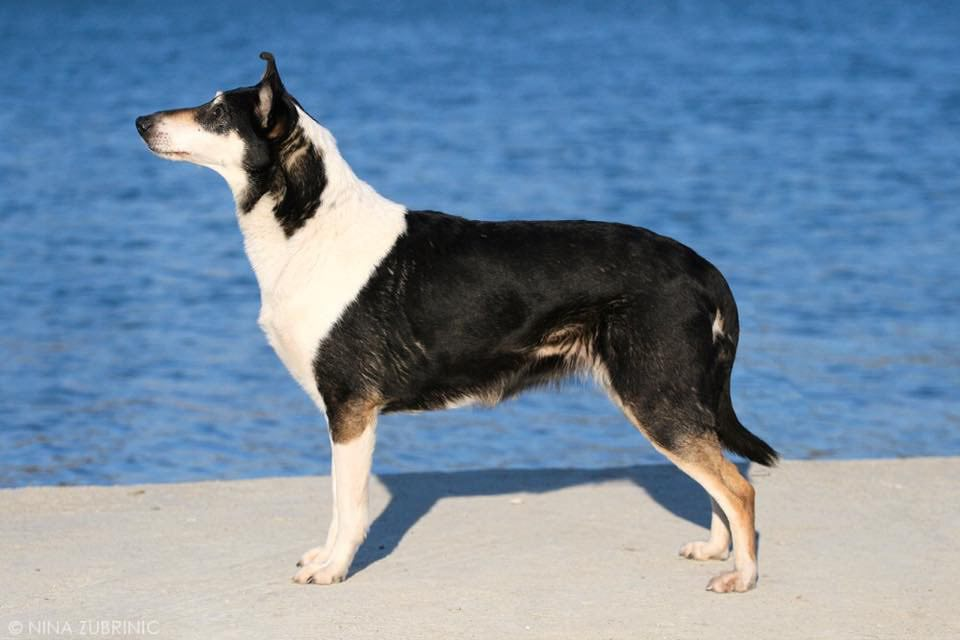
The tricolour

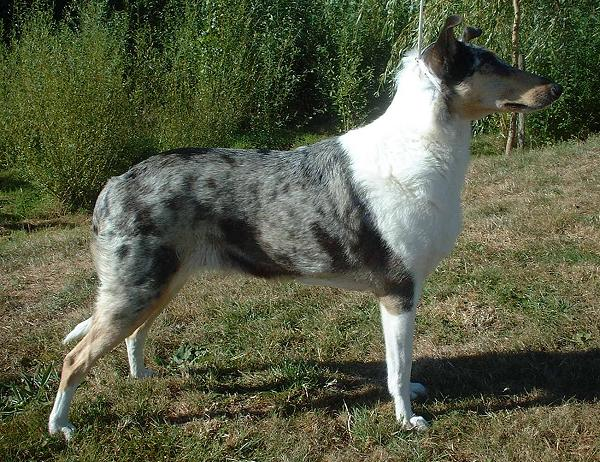
The blue merle

== Temperament ==
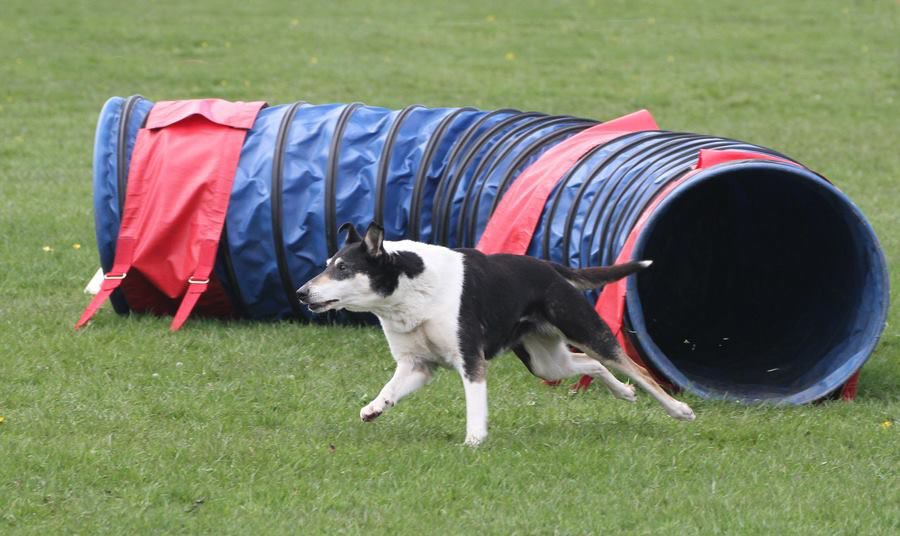
A tri-colour Smooth Collie exiting an agility tunnel.

The Smooth Collie is generally a sociable, easily trained family dog. Although not an aggressive breed, they are alert and vocal, making them both good watchdogs if well trained and potential nuisances if allowed to bark indiscriminately. Collies are agile and active dogs and need regular exercise in some way. This breed is easy to train, due to its high intelligence and eagerness to please its owners. Training this breed requires a light touch, as they are sensitive to correction and shy away from harsh treatment. They get along well with children and other animals, usually getting along with other dogs. Smooth Collies are used both as family pets and in obedience competition, agility, herding trials, and other dog sports. Some are still used as working sheepdogs. They are also useful as assistance dogs for the disabled.

== Health ==
- Progressive retinal atrophy: Gradual degeneration of the retinas of the eyes, eventually leading to blindness. This disease is less common than CEA in Collies, but more difficult to breed away from, as symptoms are not usually detectable until the affected dog is middle-aged or older.
- Multidrug sensitivity (MDR1): Sometimes fatal reactions to a class of common drugs, particularly ivermectin, used as a heartworm preventative and treatment for mites. The gene that causes this sensitivity has recently been identified, and a dog's susceptibility can now be determined through a simple blood test.
- Gastric dilatation volvulus (bloat): A painful and often fatal twisting of the stomach occurring in large or deep-chested breeds which can usually be prevented by feeding small meals and not allowing vigorous exercise immediately before or after eating.
- Epilepsy: Seizures of unknown origin. Frequency of the seizures can often be significantly reduced through medication, but there is no cure for this disease.
- Cyclic Neutropenia: CN is also known as Gray Collie Syndrome. Cyclic Neutropenia is a disease that affects the neutrophils of a dog, which are an integral part of the dog's immune system. Most affected dogs will die as puppies, and even with the best care, the dog will not likely live past 2–3 years of age.

Collie eye anomaly is an autosomal recessive condition caused by a mutation in the NHEJ1 gene that affects Collies and related breeds.

== Work and sports ==
Smooth Collies can compete in dog agility trials, obedience, showmanship, flyball, tracking, search and rescue (SAR), assistance dog and herding events. Herding instincts and trainability can be measured at noncompetitive herding tests. Collies exhibiting basic herding instincts can be trained to compete in herding trials.
