= Scots Grey =

Scottish breed of chicken

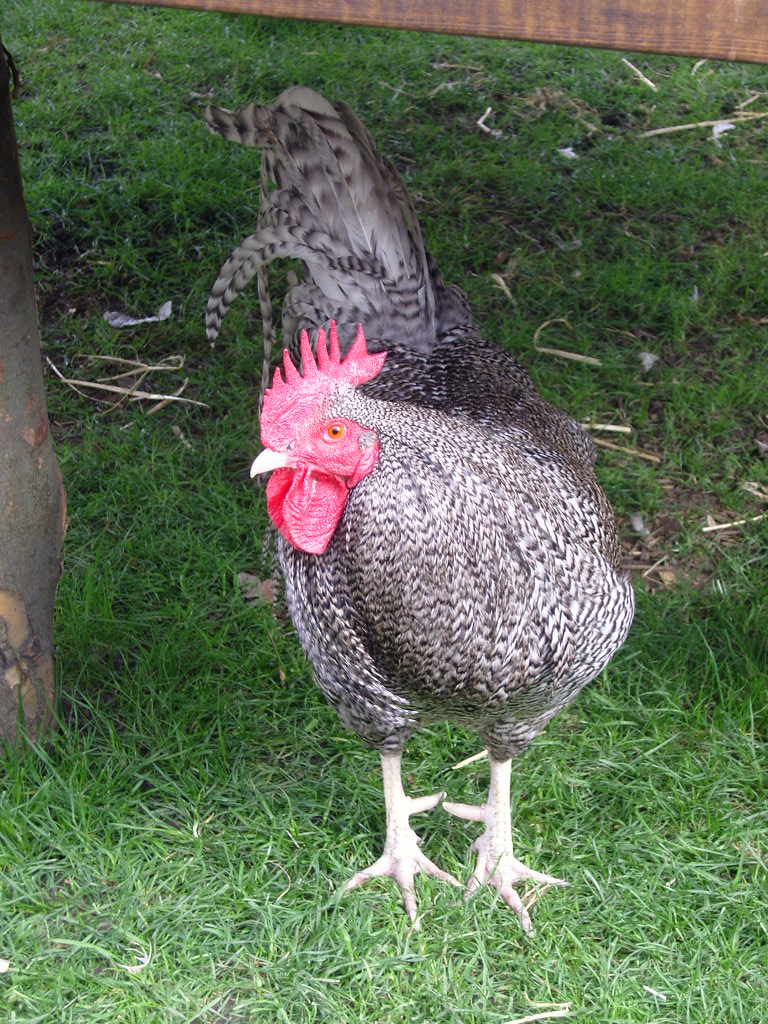
- A Scots Grey cock
- Other names: Scotch Grey; Chick Marley; Shepherd's Plaid
- Country of origin: United Kingdom
- Standard: PCGB (UK)

Traits
- Weight: Male: standard: 3.2 kg; bantam: 620–680 g; Female: standard: 2.25 kg; bantam: 510–570 g
- Skin colour: white
- Egg colour: cream
- Comb type: single

Classification
- PCGB: light: soft feather
- Chicken; Gallus gallus domesticus

The Scots Grey is a dual-purpose breed of domestic chicken originating in Scotland, where it has been bred for more than two hundred years. It was formerly known as the Scotch Grey and until about 1930 was popular in Scotland. It is on the "Native Poultry Breeds at Risk" list of the Rare Breeds Survival Trust.

== Characteristics ==
The Scots Grey is a tall, upright chicken. Apart from the height, it is similar to the Scots Dumpy. The Scots Grey has a single comb. The face, wattles, earlobes and comb are bright red, and the beak and shanks are white, sometimes marked with black.

The plumage is barred. The ground colour is steel-grey, and the barring is black with a metallic sheen. Although both sexes are closely similar (apart from secondary characteristics), the markings are larger in hens than in cocks, and may give a tartan appearance.

The Scots Grey is classed as a light breed: cocks weigh about 3.2 kilograms (7 lb) and hens about 2.25 kg (5 lb).

There is a Scots Grey bantam. Cocks weigh 620–680 grams (22–24 oz) and hens 510–570 g (18–20 oz); it is otherwise similar in all ways to the standard-sized bird.

== Use ==
The Scots Grey is a dual-purpose breed, kept both for its white eggs and for meat. It is an active bird well suited to free range management, as it is hardy, and forages well. Hens are not generally inclined to go broody.
