= Shetland cattle =

Breed of cattle

Shetland
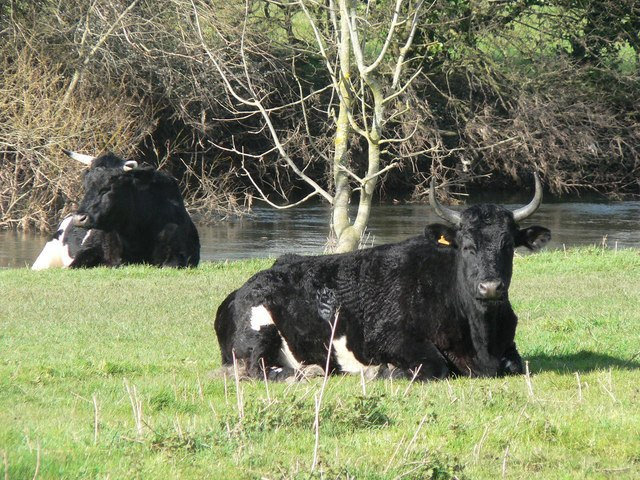
- Shetland cattle in a pasture
- Country of origin: Scotland
- Distribution: Britain; Ireland; Australia
- Use: beef; dairy; formerly draught

Traits
- Weight: Male: 550 kg; Female: 350 kg
- Coat: white spots upon black, fine-haired
- Horn status: horned

The Shetland is a small, hardy Scottish breed of cattle from the Shetland Islands to the north of mainland Scotland. The cattle are normally black and white in colour but there are smaller numbers in grey, red and dun.

== History ==
Cattle were one of the originally domesticated breeds of livestock kept by the Neolithic settlers of the Shetland islands. This happened probably no later than circa 3,600 BC. The early remains indicate a very large animal for these early farmers to cope with. It is believed these early cattle were young aurochs (Bos primigenius primigenius), captured in the Scottish forests, the direct ancestor.

Cattle bones found in these early Shetland settlements show evidence of domestication. Their joints show traces of arthritis, the teeth indicate periods of stress (manifested as rings of lighter and darker ridges), indicating regular winter hardship. Gradually, a smaller animal started to appear in the archaeological remains, and by the Bronze Age, starting ca 2,500 BC, two types of cattle appear in the remains, a larger and a smaller one. The smaller one seems to have been favoured and by the Iron Age, starting around 2,000 years ago, it is the only type occurring in the sites. This animal was just over one metre high at the shoulder and was described as “a short-legged, stocky, short-horned beast” descended from a small gene pool. A court record from 1797 describes the cattle – in terms of colours, names, ages and heights – of a particular farm involved in a legal settlement, and based on this description the cattle still had the small size of their Iron Age ancestors. Today the island cattle remain small, standing about 1.2 metres high at the withers, with a light bone structure, thin hide, fine hair and long tail with a white switch. They were once multi-coloured, but modern selection has favoured predominantly black or black and white cattle.

Alexander Fenton, citing Forsyth and Shirreff gives an estimate of just over 40,000 head of cattle in 1808 and less than half of that, circa 15,000 in 1814 due to the expansion in the human population. The small tenanted farms or crofts were made smaller by the land-owning lairds to increase the number of tenants they could oblige to undertake the haaf (deep-sea) fishery for them. This was a period of starvation and poverty for Shetlanders and their livestock. As the Haaf fishery trade in salted, dried fish waned, the lairds cleared off many of their tenants in favour of sheep ranching and where possible heavier British breeds of cattle. The Shetland cow supported many families children through these hard times. Only a breed with special traits could cope with such extremes.

The period of agricultural improvement during the 19th century saw imported heavy breeds of cattle, sheep and horses arrive that was to the detriment of the native breeds. The early years of the 20th century saw something of a revival in interest and appreciation in the Shetland. The Shetland Cattle Herd Book Society was established with a Register being produced for 1912. The Herd Book described the breed's features and provided a register of calves and bulls. The SCHBS carried on through the First World War but stalled in 1921 amid the post-war privations. This short-lived renaissance was subsequently damaged by the UK Government determining that the new post-Second World War incentives of subsidies should not apply to Shetland cattle. While the Shetland cattle could thrive on inhospitable lands, the evolution of agricultural practices and chemicals made grass more plentiful for less hardy breeds, whose larger bulls could sire calves that would grow larger and more quickly. Increasing the size of the cattle was attractive in the aftermath of John Boyd-Orr's influential studies in the 1930s, which revealed a deficiency in the "midst of plenty" among the United Kingdom's urban proletariat, whose diet lacked meat. The UK Department of Agriculture and latterly the Crofters Commission made available bulls of much larger breeds favoured by UK mainland markets. This combined with the hard economics of the period to remove thousands of native cows through cross-breeding. Subsidy-driven agriculture nearly destroyed the Shetland cattle.

By the time oil was discovered off Shetland, the breed was near extinction and was saved primarily through the efforts of people like T. A. U. Fraser (known as Tammy o da Glebe). He started in 1938 with a stock of four cattle and in the early 1980s was able to help re-establish the breed following the dispersal of his herd. The year 1981 saw a determined attempt to, once again, save the breed through the establishment of the New Foundation Herd Book and Shetland Cattle Herd Book Society (SCHBS). For a period of time Shetland Islands Council assisted with support for purebred calves. In recent years no financial support has been offered by either Governments or agencies leaving the breed's future in the hands of volunteers.

During the Falklands War, five pregnant cows and one bull were sent to the Falkland Islands, to replace livestock killed in the conflict. They were sent by the Rare Breeds Survival Trust, which surprised many, given how rare the cattle were. At that time, only 121 adult cows were registered; and this was seen as a way to boost numbers.

The Shetland Cattle Herd Book Society has fought since 1981 to maintain the Herd Book in the islands of Shetland as the home of the breed. The SCHBS led several initiatives to record the special traits of the breed. These included weaning weight analysis and fatty acid analysis. As an ‘unimproved’ breed it still retains healthsome characteristics that have been lost from modern breeds. The meat and milk of the breed are proven through a range of studies to contain far more minerals and healthy fatty acids and far less unhealthy trans fatty acids than conventional modern breeds.

Efforts to restore the Shetland breed continue. The Shetland Cattle Herd Book Society continues to protect the breed. The SCHBS now hosts a database and semen store where valuable genetics are preserved to maintain valuable traits and made available to members. The Shetland Cattle Breeder's Association, a group of mainland UK breeders, also provides assistance to its members concerning genetic records, breeding plans, husbandry, and the location of Shetland breeders. The association also provides advertising services for its members.

== Characteristics ==
Shetland cattle are usually black and white, similar in colour to the Holstein Friesian breed. However, an estimated 10 per cent are red and white, while a small but growing percentage are dun and grey. The cows are typically smaller than most, ranging from 350 kg (770 lb)—450 kg (990 lb), while the bulls range from 550 kg (1,210 lb)—600 kg (1,300 lb). They are regarded as small in size by most breeders and organisations. Their horns curve upwards, but these are trimmed during commercial production.

A long hairy coat protects the cattle during the winter, but this is shed during the summer months. Many breeders see many desirable traits in Shetland cattle, such as easy calving and fast growing to adult size.

== Use ==
Shetland cattle are used as beef cattle in speciality, niche markets. These cattle are usually kept on small-scale farms that rely on a high income from sales and low maintenance costs for feed. The cattle are also still kept by a very small number of self-sufficient people in Shetland. There are currently 800 registered breeding cows and an average of 180 calves born each year.

== See also ==
- Shetland animal breeds

== Sources ==
- Abernethy, Clare (2009a). "A colourful story!". A Pictorial 'Daander Trowe' Shetland's Crofting Culture: centenary celebration: illustrating the role of the Shetland coo - a breed from the past with a place in the future. Shetland Cattle from Shetland Breeders Group, Shetland Cattle from Shetland Breeders Group Staff, Shetland Cattle Herd Book Society, Shetland Cattle Herd Book Society Staff. Lerwick. pp. 82–83. ISBN 9780956370105. OCLC 745360657.
- Abernethy, Clare (2009b). "TAU Fraser. Founder of Heather & Glebe lines.". A Pictorial 'Daander Trowe' Shetland's Crofting Culture: centenary celebration: illustrating the role of the Shetland coo - a breed from the past with a place in the future. Shetland Cattle from Shetland Breeders Group, Shetland Cattle from Shetland Breeders Group Staff, Shetland Cattle Herd Book Society, Shetland Cattle Herd Book Society Staff. Lerwick. pp. 82–83. ISBN 9780956370105. OCLC 745360657.
- Bond, Julie (2009). "Cattle in prehistoric Shetland". A Pictorial 'Daander Trowe' Shetland's Crofting Culture: centenary celebration: illustrating the role of the Shetland coo - a breed from the past with a place in the future. Shetland Cattle from Shetland Breeders Group, Shetland Cattle from Shetland Breeders Group Staff, Shetland Cattle Herd Book Society, Shetland Cattle Herd Book Society Staff. Lerwick. pp. 14–16. ISBN 9780956370105. OCLC 745360657.
- Eunson, Ronnie (2003). "Shetland cattle: The gentle kine". In Kolhberg, Nancy; Kopper, Philip (eds.). Shetland Breeds: Little Animals... Very Full of Spirit,: Ancient, Endangered & Adaptable: a compendium with principal essays. Chevy Chase, Maryland: Posterity Press. pp. 96–115. ISBN 9781889274102. OCLC 54056272.
- Eunson, Ronnie (2009). "Origins of Shetland cattle". A Pictorial 'Daander Trowe' Shetland's Crofting Culture: centenary celebration: illustrating the role of the Shetland coo - a breed from the past with a place in the future. Lerwick: Shetland Cattle from Shetland Breeders Group. pp. 19–25. ISBN 9780956370105. OCLC 745360657.
- Fenton, Alexander (1978). The Northern Isles: Orkney and Shetland. Edinburgh: Donald. ISBN 9780859760195. OCLC 4391993.
- Forsyth, Robert (1808). The beauties of Scotland. Vol. V. Edinburgh: T. Bonar and J. Brown. p. 131. OCLC 761876234.
- Lewis, Ron (1999). Analysis of milk samples of Shetland Cattle (Report). SAC.
- Lewis; Offer; Eunson (2000). Investigating the Conjugate Linoleic Acid (CLA) content of Shetland lamb and beef (Report). SAC.
- Lowman, Basil (1998). A study on the performance of Shetland cross suckled calves (Report). SAC.
- Shirreff, John (1814). General view of the agriculture of the Shetland Islands: with observations on the means of their improvement; drawn up for the consideration of the Board of Agriculture. Edinburgh: A. Constable. p. 60. OCLC 54547060.
- "History of Shetland Cattle". Shetland Cattle Herd Book Society. 2016.
- "Semen Store". Shetland Cattle Herd Book Society. 2016.
- "Why Choose Shetland Cattle?". Shetland Cattle Herd Book Society. 2016.
