= Shetland animal breeds =

Animal breeds of the Shetland Islands of Scotland

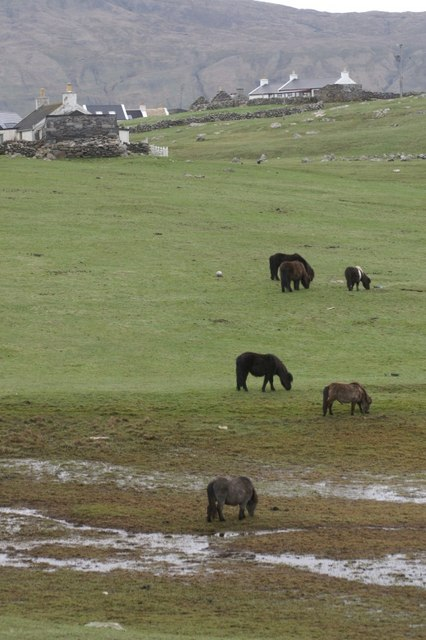
Shetland ponies grazing near Papil, West Burra, Shetland Islands

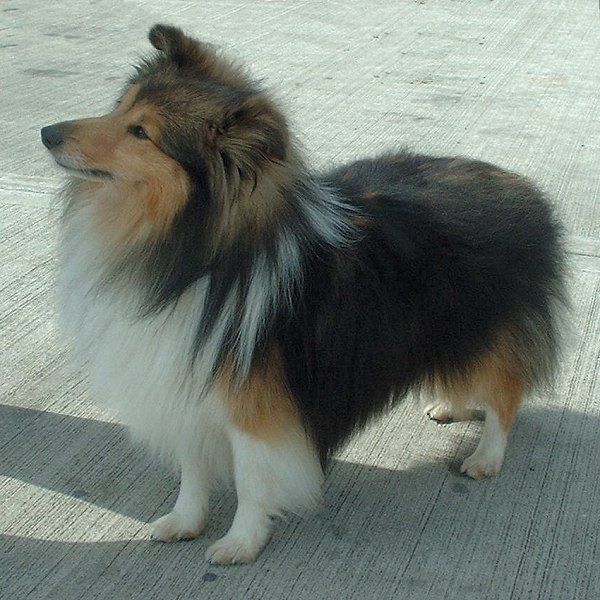
Shetland sheep dog

The Shetland Islands of Scotland have long had their own distinct animal breeds, due to the remoteness of the archipelago. Below is a list of Shetland's domesticated animals.

== Shetland Pony ==
The Shetland Pony is a very small, robust breed of pony. Shetlands range in size from about 710 to 1070 mm, with an official maximum height at the withers (1200 mm for American Shetlands). Shetland Ponies have heavy coats and short legs, and are considered quite intelligent. They are a very strong breed, used for riding, driving, and pack purposes.

== Shetland Sheepdog ==
The original Shetland Sheepdog was of Spitz type, similar to the Icelandic Sheepdog and other Scandinavian dogs. However, in the course of development in England as a pet breed, it was crossbred with other dogs including the Rough Collie and the Pomeranian; and the modern Shetland or "Sheltie" now resembles a miniature Rough Collie. The original working Shetland Sheepdog does not survive. Modern Shetland Sheepdogs are used primarily as pets, but excel at canine sports such as agility and obedience. Most retain some herding instinct, to varying degrees. They are among the most loyal breeds of dogs, sometimes referred to as a "shadow," because they are generally found right by their human's side.

== Shetland cattle ==
The cattle kept in Shetland developed as a very hardy, small breed, used for both dairy and beef. Modern Shetland cattle are usually pied black and white, although other colours were common in the past and sometimes still occur. These cattle are similar in type to other European traditional cattle breeds, and are sometimes used for conservation grazing (the management of natural habitats using grazing animals).

== Shetland sheep ==
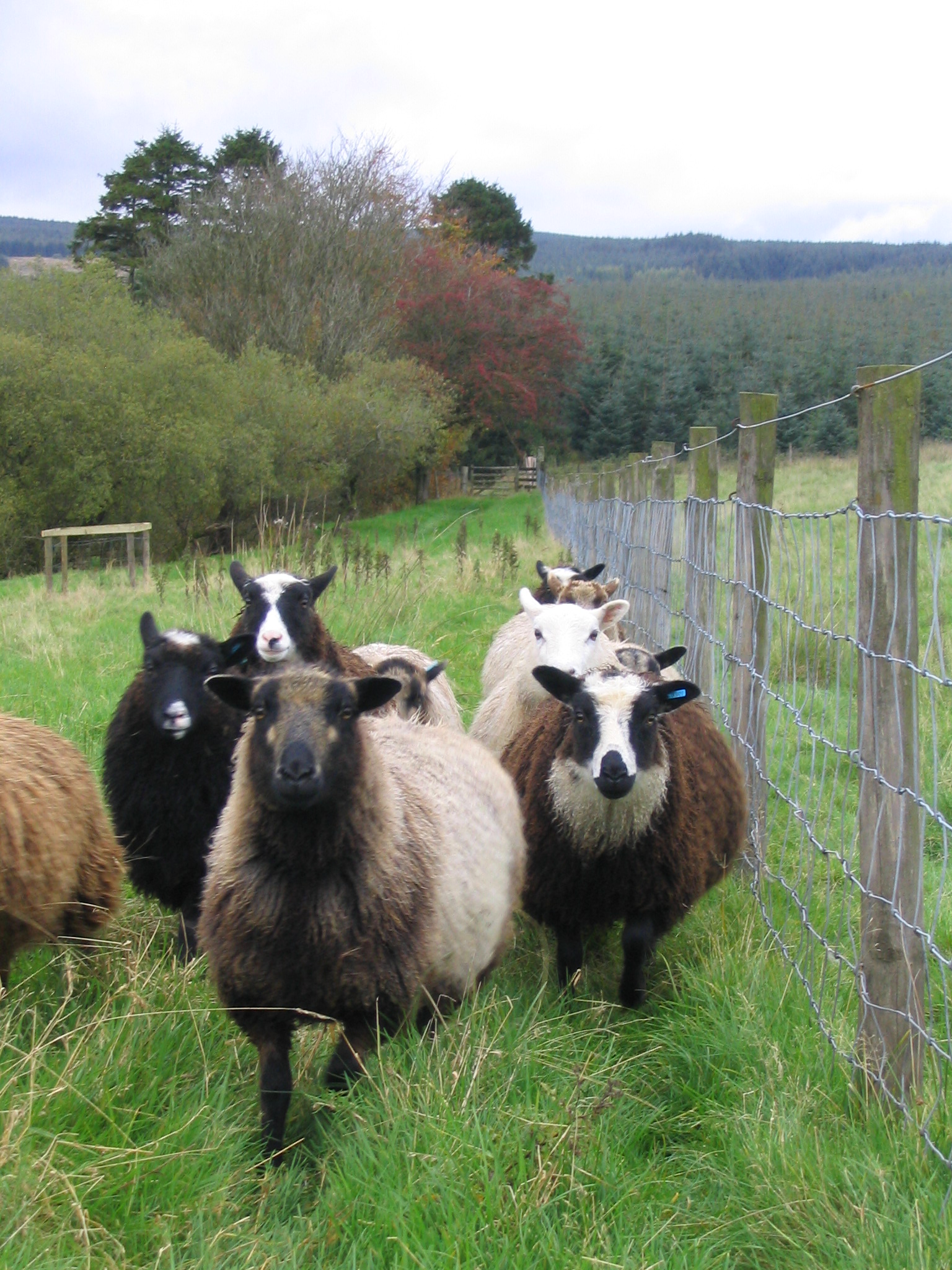
Shetland ewes

Sheep have been kept in the Shetland Isles for at least a thousand years. They are one of the Northern European short-tailed sheep group of breeds, and were regarded as a local version of the extinct Scottish Dunface, which was found throughout the Highlands and Islands of Scotland (and which was also the ancestor of the Hebridean and North Ronaldsay sheep). Shetlands are classed as a landrace or "unimproved" breed.

Although Shetlands are small and slow-growing compared to other breeds, they are hardy, thrifty, easy lambers, adaptable and long-lived. The Shetland breed has survived for centuries in difficult conditions and on a poor diet so they thrive in better conditions. Shetlands retain many of their primitive survival instincts making them easier to care for than many modern breeds.

== Shetland pig ==
Shetland was the last surviving locality for a type of domestic pig known as the "grice". Small in size yet ferocious, this domesticated breed of pig fell out of favour with crofters during the 19th century; sometime between the middle of the 19th century and the 1920s, the breed became extinct. In addition to the Shetland Islands, the grice had once been found throughout the Highlands and Islands of Scotland, as well as in Ireland.

== Shetland goose ==
The Shetland goose is a small, hardy breed of domestic goose originating in the islands. It is sexually dimorphic, with ganders being entirely white and females white with grey patches. They tend to mate for life and are extremely good foragers. A small number have been exported to North America, but are not yet recognised by the American Poultry Association.

== Shetland duck ==
The Shetland duck is a small, hardy breed of domestic duck originating in the islands. It is similar to the Pomeranian duck or Swedish Blue duck. It is black with a white bib. Shetland drakes have sky blue bills and Shetland duck females have slate blue bills. The average weight of the Shetland duck is 2 kg for males and 1,8 kg for females. It is critically endangered.

== See also ==
- List of domesticated Scottish breeds
