= Rough Collie =

Dog breed

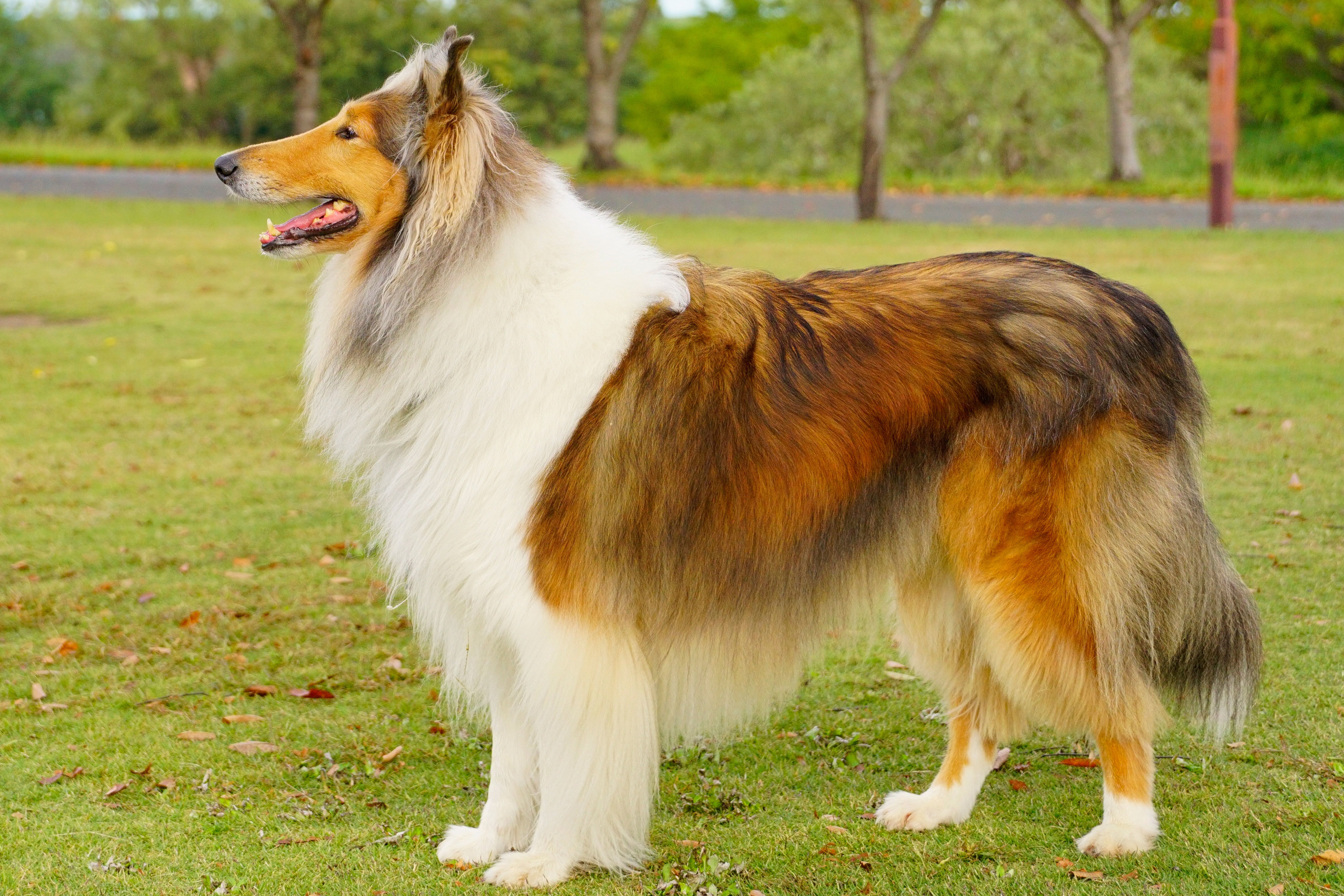
- Sable and white
- Other names: Collie; Long-Haired Collie
- Origin: United Kingdom
Traits
Height	Males	56–61 cm (22–24 in)
	Females	51–56 cm (20–22 in)
- Coat: long double coat
- Colour: colour-headed white; blue merle, sable merle, double merle; sable, mahogany sable, shaded sable; tri-coloured
Kennel club standards
- The Kennel Club: standard
- Fédération Cynologique Internationale: standard

The Rough Collie or Long-Haired Collie is a British breed of long-coated herding dog of medium to large size. It is identical to the Smooth Collie in all respects but the length of the coat. Dogs of both breeds were bred for herding sheep in Scotland. In the twenty-first century the Rough Collie is commonly kept as a companion dog, or may be bred for showing. The recognised coat colours are sable or merle in various shades, tri-coloured or colour-headed white.

The Rough Collie is similar in appearance to the smaller Shetland Sheepdog, but a genetic link between the two breeds is not established.

== History ==
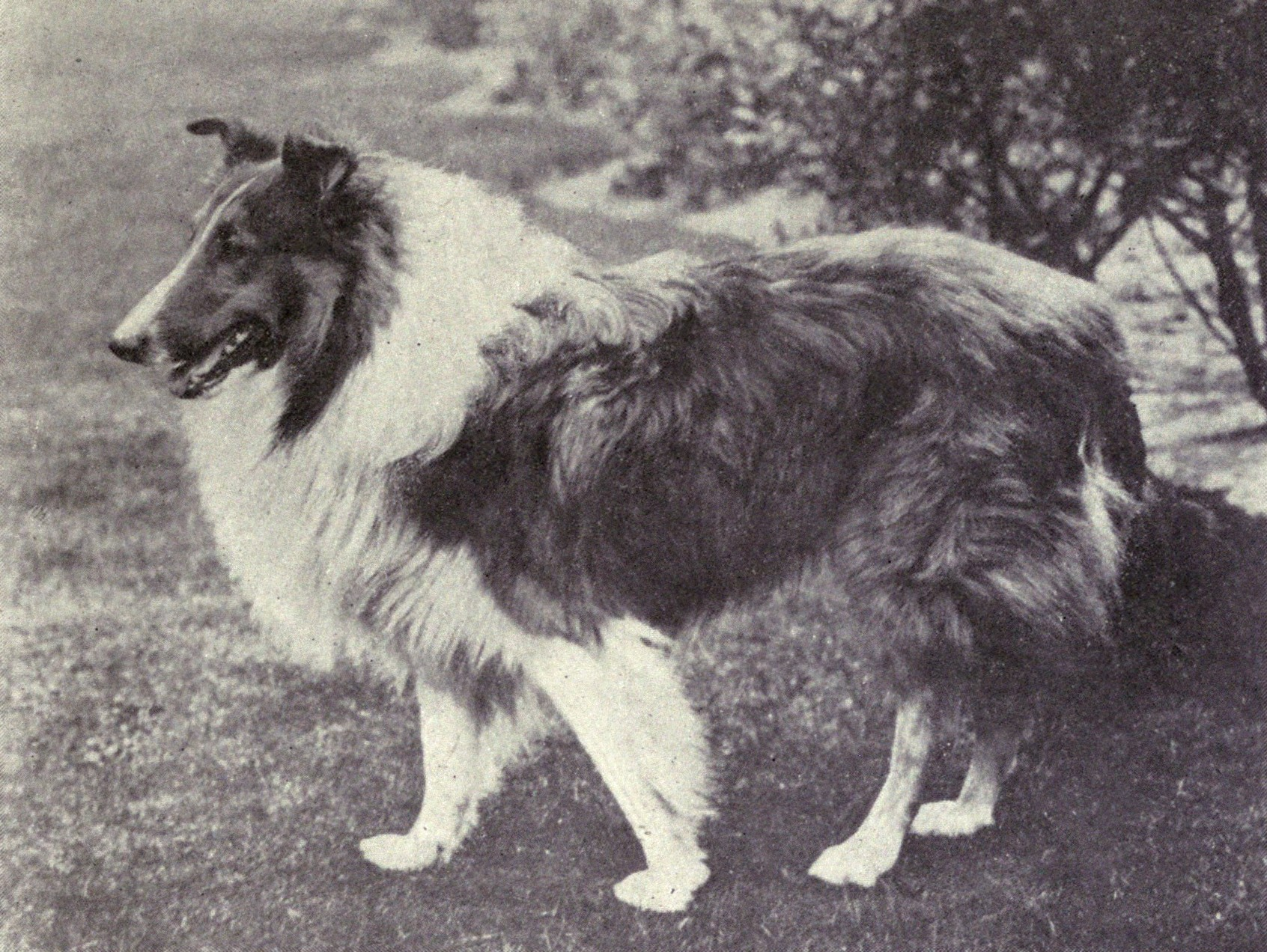
Rough Collie, circa 1915

Both the Rough and the Smooth Collie descend from a localised variety of herding dog originating in Scotland and Wales. The Scottish variety was a large, strong, aggressive dog, bred to herd highland sheep. The Welsh variety was small and nimble, domesticated and friendly, and also herded goats. When the English saw these dogs at the Birmingham market, they interbred them with their own variety of sheepdogs, producing a mixture of short- and long-haired varieties. After the Industrial Revolution, dog ownership became fashionable, and these early collies were believed to have been crossed with the Borzoi (Russian Wolfhound) to get a more "noble" head (longer muzzle), which is today one of the true characteristics of the Rough Collie. It is not known conclusively if the Borzoi cross made it into the mainstream of the breed.

When Queen Victoria acquired a Rough Collie, after seeing one at Balmoral Castle, they were transformed into something of a fashion item. Continued breeding for show purposes drastically changed the appearance of the dogs; in the 1960s, it was a much taller dog than it is today (in the UK; in the US, the size standard has not been revised downward and dogs have remained between 24 and 26"). Earlier dogs were also more sturdy in build and reportedly capable of covering up to 100 miles in one day. In the UK the Rough Collie is no longer used for serious herding, having been replaced by the Border Collie, though in the United States and a number of European countries, there has been a resurgence in the use of the Collie as a working and performance dog.

The Collie Club of America is one of the oldest breed-specific clubs in existence in the United States (founded in 1886). The Collie Club in England dates from 1881.

== Appearance ==
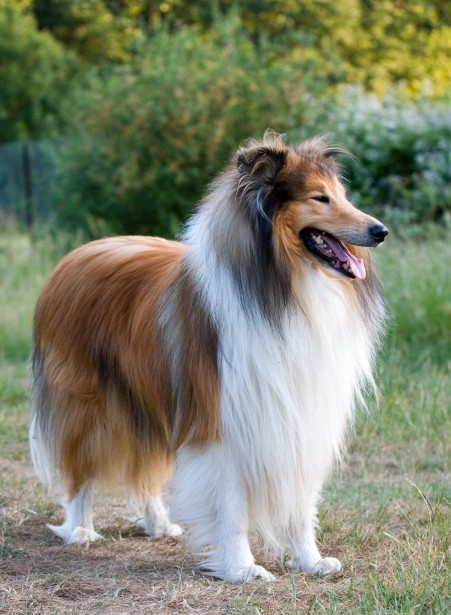
Sable

Recognized colours include:

- Sable and white, where the "sable" ranges from pale tan to a mahogany
- Tricolour, which is primarily black edged in tan
- Merle, Blue or Sable merle, which is mottled.
- Colour-headed white, which is a mainly all-white coat, except for the head, which could be tri-, sable or blue.

All have white coat areas, in the collar, parts of the leg, and usually the tail tip. Some may have white blazes on their faces. Note that the American Kennel Club accepts colour-headed white, where the dog is predominantly white with coloured markings of sable, tricolour, or blue merle on the head and sometimes body patches. The downy undercoat is covered by a long, dense, coarse outer coat with a notable ruff around the neck, feathers about the legs, a petticoat on the abdomen, and a frill on the hindquarters. One of the characteristic features of the Rough Collie is its head. This is light in relation to the rest of the body, and resembles a blunted wedge tapering smoothly from ears to black nose, with a distinct stop and parallel head planes. The muzzle is well rounded, and never square. There is considerable variation in the colour of the head, however. The eyes are medium-sized and almond shaped. The ears are supposed to be semi-prick, or tipped, with the upper third folded over. Ears which do not "tip" properly, however, are common, and many collies have their ears taped as puppies (using medical adhesive or paper tape) to encourage them to lie properly – no cutting or surgery is involved.

Rough Collies have a more blunt, gradually tapering, face than the smaller, but otherwise very similar Shetland Sheepdog, which is partly descended from the Rough Collie. The planes of the muzzle and the top of the skull should be parallel in collies, with a slight but distinct stop. (In shelties, the planes are not parallel.) The ears of a Rough Collie are similar to a Shetland Sheepdog's, but larger. Furthermore, once seen, the contrast between the Rough Collie head and that of a Border Collie is immediately apparent, the latter having a considerably shorter muzzle and a more distinct stop between muzzle and forehead. The ruff is also distinctive in distinguishing the two breeds.

The size and weight varies among breed standards; male collies can stand 55.8 to 66 cm (22 to 26 in) at the shoulder; the female averages 5 cm (2 in) shorter. The males are usually in the weight range (50–70 lbs), and the females are usually 5 to 10 lbs less. Collies in the US are sometimes reported to be over one hundred pounds, but a large collie typically weighs no more than 70 pounds. US and UK standards may differ. The UK standard calls for dogs to be significantly smaller than those under the American Kennel Club.

== Health ==
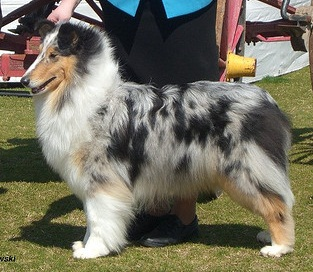
Blue merle

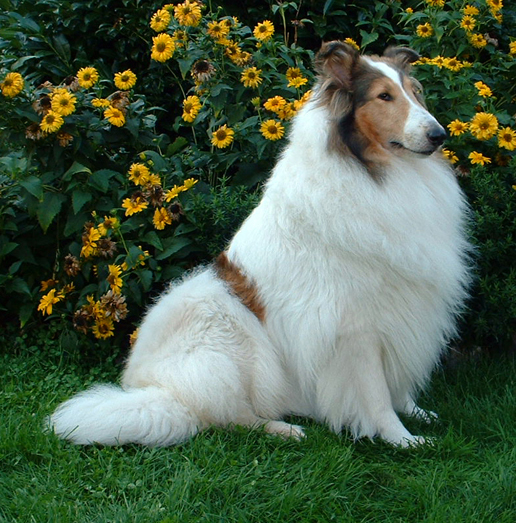
Colour-headed white

While Rough Collies are generally resilient and healthy, there are some health problems that can affect the breed.

Collie eye anomaly (CEA), a genetic disease which causes improper development of the eye and possible blindness, is a common ailment in the breed. More rarely, Rough Collies can be affected by progressive retinal atrophy (PRA), another genetic disease in which bilateral degeneration of the retina results in progressive vision loss culminating in blindness. Through genetic testing and careful screening program it would be theoretically possible to eradicate both of these problems in purebred lines, however, certainly in the UK, the Kennel Club does not require these tests to be done either for registration or showing. CEA is so prevalent that elimination of affected dogs except through very slow and careful breeding decisions to avoid shrinking the gene pool more than absolutely necessary. Rough Collie puppies should be screened at an early age (6–8 weeks) by a certified veterinary ophthalmologist to check for CEA. PRA has a later onset and can be detected by DNA test, but is much less widespread (in the US) than CEA. (In the UK, PRA is more common.) Note, the UK Kennel Club "Accredited Breeder Scheme" requires eye tests and recommends the genetic test for this class of members.

Canine cyclic neutropenia is a cyclic blood disorder that is usually fatal to affected puppies. The disease is also referred to as "gray collie syndrome", due to affected puppies having a pale grey, pinkish/gray or beige colouring, none of which are normal Rough Collie colours. Puppies that survive through adulthood are plagued with immune disorders throughout their lives and rarely live more than three years. DNA testing can help detect carriers of the recessive gene that causes the disease.

Hip dysplasia: As with most of the larger breeds, hip dysplasia is a potential concern for Rough Collies. Although this disease appears to be "multigene", careful selection by many breeders is reducing this problem. The UK Kennel Club "Accredited Breeder Scheme" requires hip-scores this class of members, however, a very small proportion of UK registered puppies are bred under this scheme. Hip dysplasia is rare in collies compared to their closest relatives and other breeds of the same size.

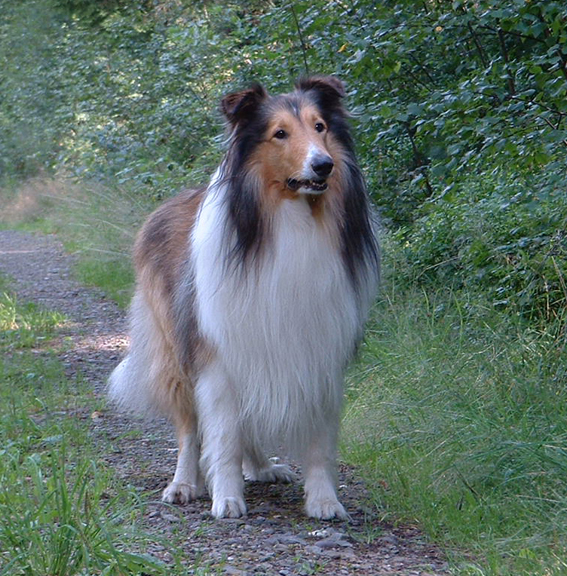
Mahogany sable Rough Collie

Rough Collies may carry a mutant Mdr1 gene that results in a sensitivity to ivermectin and related drugs. A screening test is used to determine if alternative medications are required. Overdoses from the proscribed medications can result in neurological impairment or even death, but preventative doses are usually safe. This faulty gene is present in several breeds, but is well known among collies.

In addition to these problems, all of which can be tested for, there are a number of problems which are thought to be genetic but for which no screening test exists. These include epilepsy, bloat, a tendency towards allergies, and thyroid disorders (primarily hypothyroidism.). Because no DNA tests exist for these disorders (and all can have causes other than genetic origins), breeders can only do their best to avoid producing them by removing affected dogs from the gene pool.

Ulcerative dermatosis of Shetland sheepdog and rough collie (UDSSC) is a disease that is believed to be a vesicular variant of discoid lupus erythematosus. It is an ulcerative dermatosis that affects the thigh, groin, axillae, and ventral abdomen.

== Working life ==
=== Herding ===
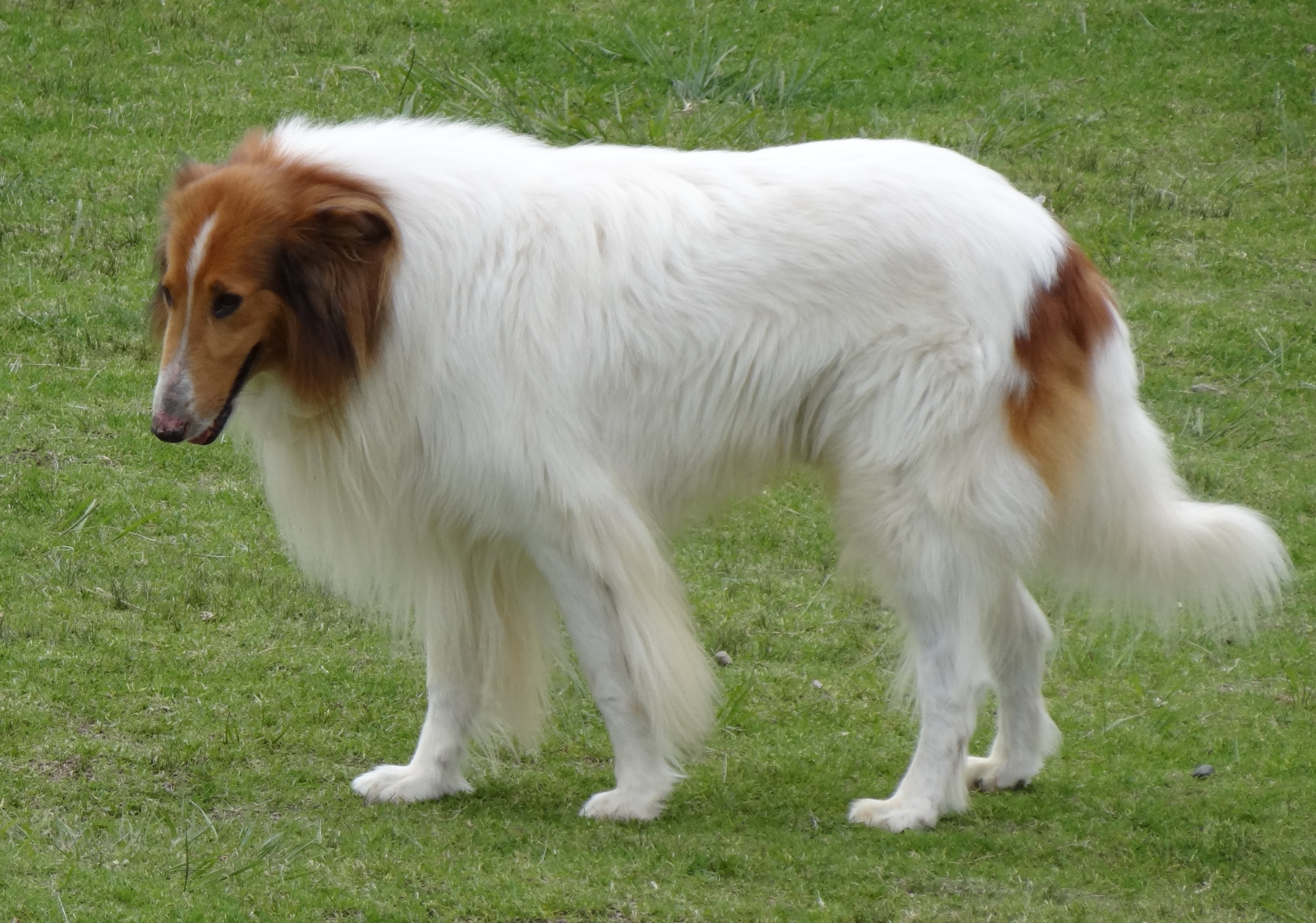
In the 18th century, the Collie's natural home was in the highlands of Scotland

In the 18th century, the Collie's natural home was in the highlands of Scotland, where it had been used for centuries as a sheepdog. The dogs were bred with great care in order to assist their masters in the herding and guarding of their flock.

Collies have historically been used as herding dogs and may be kept as working dogs on farms and ranches or for small-scale livestock management. Herding activities can provide opportunities to maintain and demonstrate the breed's working abilities, including trainability, adaptability, agility, and responsiveness to handlers.

Throughout the country there are local herding clubs that provide clinics, work days, trials and tests. Several organisations provide herding title programs in which Collies regularly participate. A Herding Instinct Test introduces Collies and their handlers to herding at the basic level. It is designed to show whether or not a Collie, who may have never had any exposure to livestock, still has the natural instinct to perform the function for which the breed was initially created. It is a non-competitive introduction to carefully selected and easily handled livestock under favourably controlled conditions.

=== Activities ===
Rough Collies can compete in dog agility trials, obedience, conformation, flyball, tracking, and herding events. Herding instincts and trainability can be measured at noncompetitive herding tests. Rough Collies exhibiting basic herding instincts can be trained to compete in herding trials. The breed has also been known to work as search and rescue dogs, therapy dogs and guide dogs for the blind.

== Notable Rough Collies ==
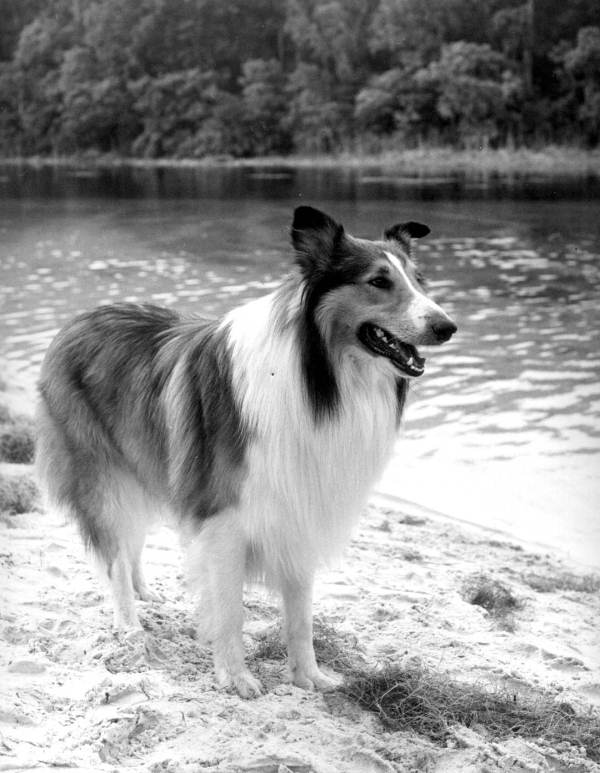
Lassie TV series (1954–1973), filming on location in Florida (1965)

- Lassie, a line of Rough Collies originally owned by Rudd Weatherwax that have starred in numerous films, multiple television series, a radio program, and has been the subject of various novels and non-fiction works. One of the few animal actors to have a star on the Hollywood Walk of Fame.
- Reveille is the name of the current mascot of Texas A&M University. Since Reveille III became the mascot in 1966, each dog to bear that name has been a Rough Collie; the current mascot is Reveille X. She assumed her duties in 2021, and she was donated by Rough Collie breeders Julie Hinrichsen and Russell Dyke of Juell Collies.
- Dylan, Argentine president Alberto Fernández's pet dog.
- Lad, the main hero of Albert Payson Terhune's early 20th-century novels about his Sunnybank Rough Collies.
- Wolf, the main hero of Albert Payson Terhune's early 20th-century novels about his Sunnybank Rough Collies.
- Gray Dawn, another of Albert Payson Terhune's early 20th-century novels about his Sunnybank Rough Collies.
- Pal, the first Rough Collie to portray Lassie.
- John Wayne's character Jacob McCandles in the 1971 movie Big Jake has a Rough Collie named "Dog" who obeyed varied commands by simply hearing his name spoken.
- Ch. Laund Loyalty of Bellhaven, a nine-month-old Rough Collie who is the youngest dog to ever win the Westminster Kennel Club Dog Show.
