= Fauna of the Faroe Islands =

Animals living in the Faroes

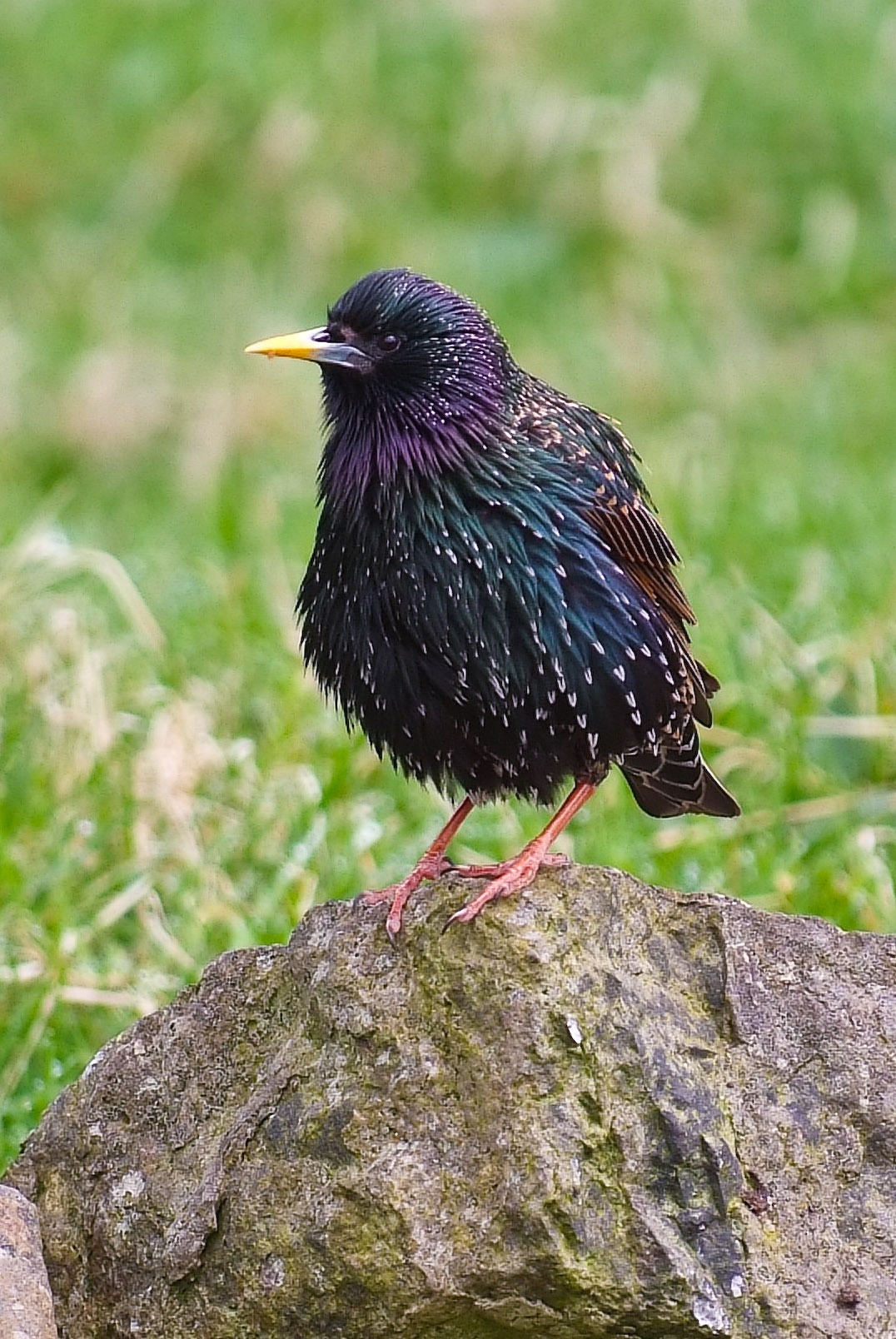
The Faroese starling

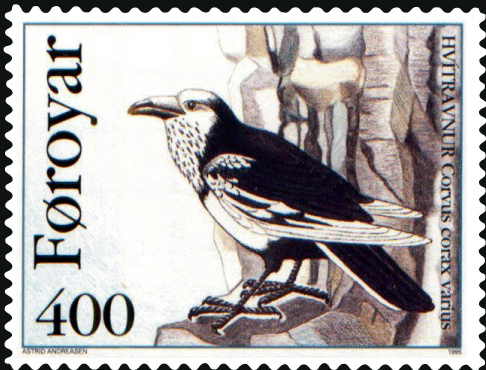
The pied raven, a colour variation of the North Atlantic subspecies (Corvus corax varius), was unique to the Faroe Islands. The last one was seen in 1902.

The fauna of the Faroe Islands is characterized by the remote location of the islands in the North Atlantic Ocean. There are few terrestrial species, but an abundance of breeding seabirds and marine animals. Some subspecies and breeds are endemic. All land mammals were introduced by humans.

== Birds ==
The avian fauna of the Faroes is dominated by seabirds and birds attracted to open land like heather, probably due to the lack of woodland and other suited habitats. There are subspecies of eider, starling, wren, guillemot, and black guillemot which are endemic to the islands. Puffins (Fratercula arctica), razorbills (Alca torda), and guillemots (Uria aalge), are very common seabirds in Faroe. Gannets (Sula sula) are common around the islands, but only breed on Mykines. Black guillemots (Cepphus grylle), eiders (Somateria mollissima) and shag (Phalacrocorax aristotelis) are common around the coast and the fulmars (Fulmarus glacialis) which immigrated to the islands in the 19th century have a steadily growing population. There are six species of seagulls (Larus) and the storm petrel (Hydrobates pelagicus) colony on Nólsoy is the largest in the world.

Inland birds are fewer in numbers. Oystercatcher (Haematopus ostralegus) (the national bird), whimbrel (Numenius phaeopus), common snipe (Gallinago gallinago) and Arctic tern (Sterna paradisea) are common on the heather hills. The Faroese starling (Sturnus vulgaris ssp. faroeensis) is the biggest starling in the world, and is very common in and around human habitation together with house sparrow (Passer domesticus). The islands' population of blackbirds (Turdus merula) has been steadily growing since it was established in the 1940s. Hooded crows (Corvus cornix) and the North Atlantic subspecies of raven (Corvus corax varius) are also common around areas of human habitation. Until the 19th century, a uniquely coloured variant of raven - the pied raven - occurred in the islands. This was a colour morph of the North Atlantic raven, rather than a subspecies in its own right. This colour variation was unique to the Faroe Islands, and created a high demand for the birds among foreign collectors. This may have helped wipe out the raven's unique colour morph within the Faroese population; the last confirmed record of a pied raven was in 1902.

== Land mammals ==
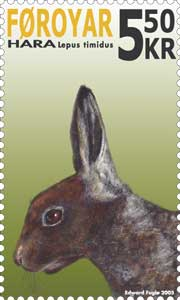
Faroese mountain hare (Lepus timidus)

The land mammals of Faroe have all been introduced, accidentally or deliberately, by people. Although nine species of wild land mammal have been reported on the Faroe Islands, only three have survived and are thriving on the islands today: mountain hare (Lepus timidus), brown rat (Rattus norvegicus) and the house mouse (Mus domesticus).

Mountain hares were introduced from Kragerø in Norway in 1854. The first years, some of the hares developed a white coat in winter, like their ancestors from Norway, but after a few decades, due to the oceanic climate with its lack of snow cover, the Faroese hares had adopted common traits with the Irish hares (Lepus timidus hibernicus) staying brown most of the year and turning grey in winter. Hares are present on all but three of the smaller islands, Koltur, Stóra Dímun and Lítla Dímun.

The Faroese house mouse was probably introduced accidentally from Britain by the Irish monks as early as the 6th century. It is the Western European house mouse (Mus domesticus) but has earlier been labelled as Mus musculus. This naming has also been used to name the subspecies which has evolved in the isolated island populations. The Nólsoy house mouse is a subspecies called (Mus musculus faroeensis) and the Mykines house mouse is also a subspecies called (Mus musculus mykinessiensis). However, a recent study, based on DNA-analyses, has shown that mice on the most remote islands (Hesti, Fugloy, Mykines and Nólsoy) are characterized as M. m. domesticus, whereas the mice on the better connected islands (Sandoy and in Torshavn) are mixed and have both M. m. musculus and M. m. domesticus genetic elements. Furthermore, the investigation indicated that the majority of the mice have their origins in south-western Norway, in agreement with human historical data, while the mice on the island of Sandoy may have arrived from the British Isles or from Denmark. The M. m. musculus genetic component appears to derive from recent immigrant mice from Denmark. The wood mouse or field mouse (Apodemus sylvaticus) was recorded on the Faroe Islands in the 17th century, but has not been recorded since. These recordings might have been mistaken. The house mouse is present on the islands Mykines, Streymoy, Fugloy, Hestur, Nólsoy and Sandoy. From time to time they have been located on Eysturoy, but they have never managed to establish themselves there due to the presence of the brown rat.

When the black rat (Rattus rattus) first came to the Faroes is unclear, but it is given the blame for having spread the plague, the Black death in 1349, since then there have been several reports of the rat going extinct in part or in whole across the archipelago, only to return at later dates. The reasons for its many disappearances vary, from legends about the use of magic to environmental reasons and disease. It has since been exterminated by the more aggressive brown rat.

The brown rat (Rattus norvegicus) is common in and around human habitations as well as in the outfield, doing big damage in bird colonies. It reached the Faroe Islands on the Norwegian ship Kongen af Preussen, which wrecked on the Scottish Isle of Lewis. The wreck drifted to Hvalba in Suðuroy in May 1768; in 1769, the rat had already established itself in Tórshavn. The brown rat replaced the former black rat (Rattus rattus) which was common in human habitation in Faroe before. It has spread to the islands Suðuroy (1768), Streymoy (1769), Eysturoy (1776), Vágar (1779), Kunoy (1914)., Borðoy (apx. 1900), and Viðoy (betw. 1904-1910). A recent genomic analyses reveal three independent introductions of the invasive brown rat to the Faroe Islands.

Rabbits (Oryctolagus cuniculus) were introduced to Suðuroy in the beginning of the 20th century. They soon spread throughout the island, but after a few years, they were exterminated. Rabbits also established colonies in the extreme south of Eysturoy (Eystnes) in the 1960s and 1970s, but they were also exterminated. In 2006 there were reports of rabbits establishing colonies on Streymoy they have since been exterminated. Every now and then escaped pets get into the mountains, but they are usually hunted down and shot shortly after being sighted, preventing further colonies from being established.

American mink (Mustela vison) have escaped from farms on several occasions, but were caught or shot most of the time, and never managed to establish a stock in the wild. Arctic foxes (Alopex lagopus) also escaped from farms now and then in the first half of the 20th century. These were individuals who survived for months in the wild until they were found and shot. Without mates they were unable to multiply.

In the beginning of the 20th century, a few hedgehogs (Erinaceus europaeus) were introduced to Tórshavn, but too few in numbers to establish a population.

Bats are infrequent guests to Faroe, and usually die soon after arrival.

Apart from the local domestic sheep breed called Faroes, the Lítla Dímun sheep, a variety of feral sheep survived on Little Dímun until the mid-19th century. There is also a local breed of horse, the Faroe pony.

From time to time, domestic cats escape into the mountains and go feral. These are usually hunted down as fast as possible, as they do heavy damage to native bird life and the introduced hare population.

== Marine mammals ==
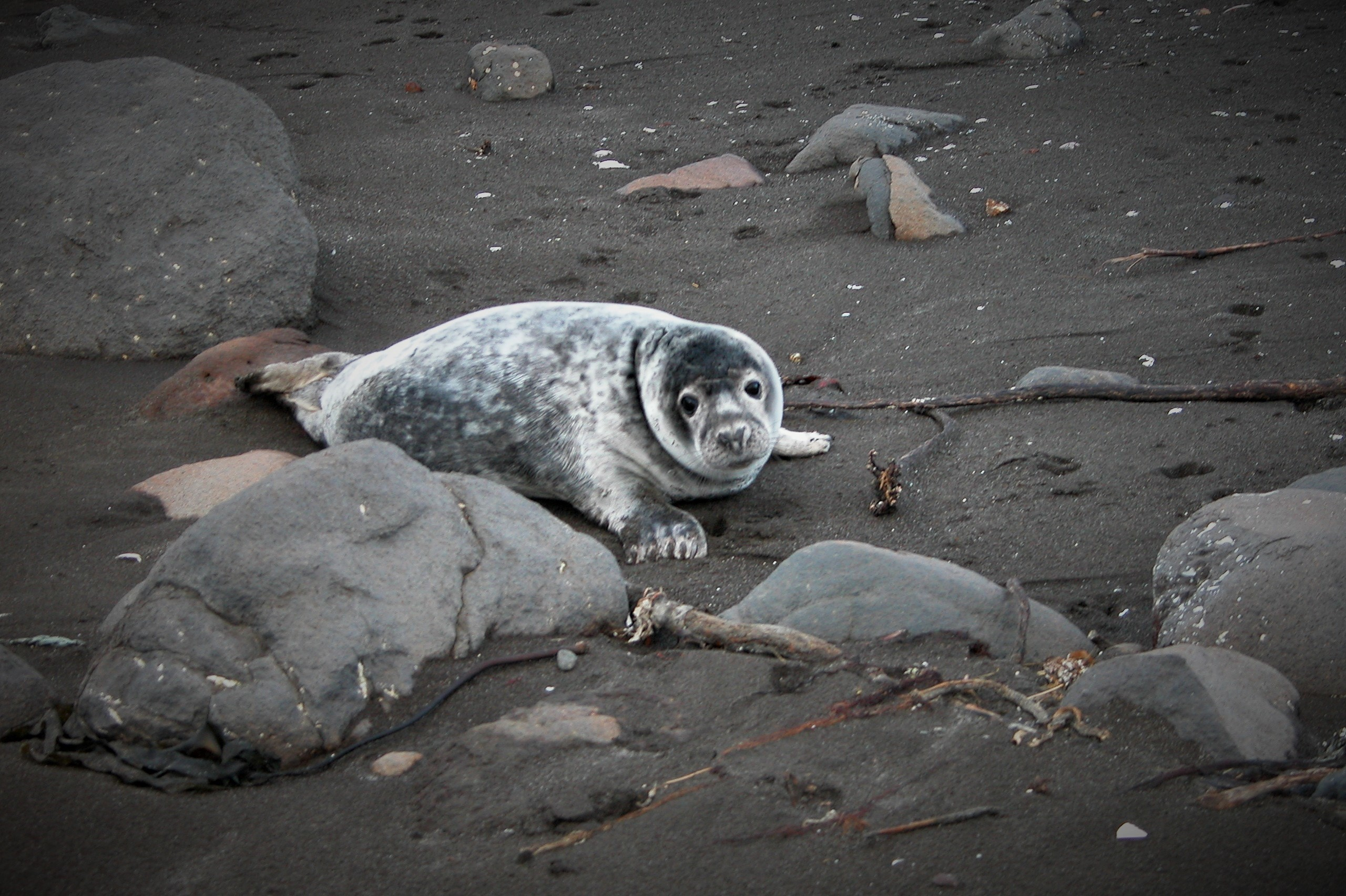
A grey seal (Halichoerus grypus), on the beach in Sandvík 2004.

Grey seals (Halichoerus grypus) are very common around the Faroese shores. Harbor seals were breeding in the Faroes until the mid-1800s; they are now an infrequent visitor, with the occasional pup or young seal spotted, indicating that breeding might start again on the islands at some point.

Several species of whales live in the waters around the Faroe Islands. Best known are the long-finned pilot whales (Globicephala melas), but the more exotic killer whales (Orcinus orca) sometimes visit the Faroese fjords as well.

Harbor porpoises are the most frequently sighted cetacea. They frequent the islands year round, though it seems to be in larger numbers around the northern islands than the rest of the country.

Blue whales can sometimes appear during the months of late April to June, and be seen migrating north through Hestfjørð and Vestmannasund on the southwest side of Streymoy (if the weather cooperates).

Bottlenose whales have a very strict migrating route, which goes south over the northern part of Suðuroy in August–September, and there are few years where no whales beach themselves on either of the two beaches at the northernmost villages of Hvalba and Sandvík.

== Amphibians ==
Naturally, there were no amphibians in the Faroe Islands. But recently frogs (Rana temporaria) have been introduced to Faroe, and are breeding successfully on Nólsoy.

A young toad (Bufo bufo) hibernating on Eysturoy was recorded in 2006; most likely a lost pet.

== Insects and other invertebrates ==
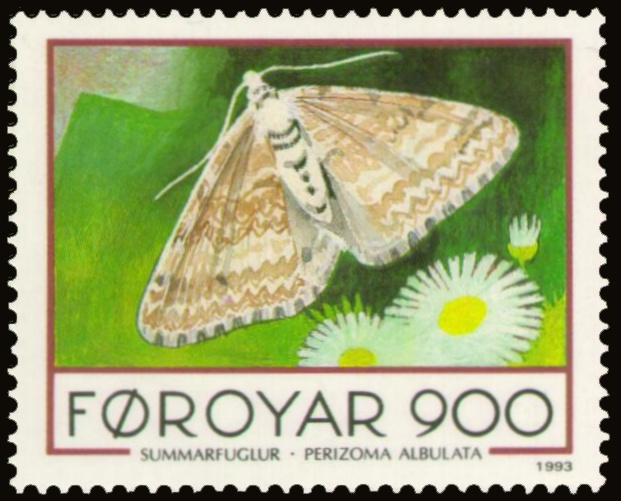
Faroese grass rivulet (Perizoma albulata)

Flies, moths, spiders, beetles, slugs, snails, earthworms and other small invertebrates are part of the indigenous fauna of the Faroe Islands.

More recent introductions are the New Zealand flatworm, the Spanish slug, and the common wasp which all have become part of the natural fauna.

Cockroaches, black garden ants, pharaoh ants and burgundy snails have also been found, but it is not clear if they have become part of the established fauna.
