= Faroe Islands domestic animals =

The domestic animals of the Faroe Islands are a result of 1200 years of isolated breeding. As a result, many of the islands' domestic animals are found nowhere else in the world.

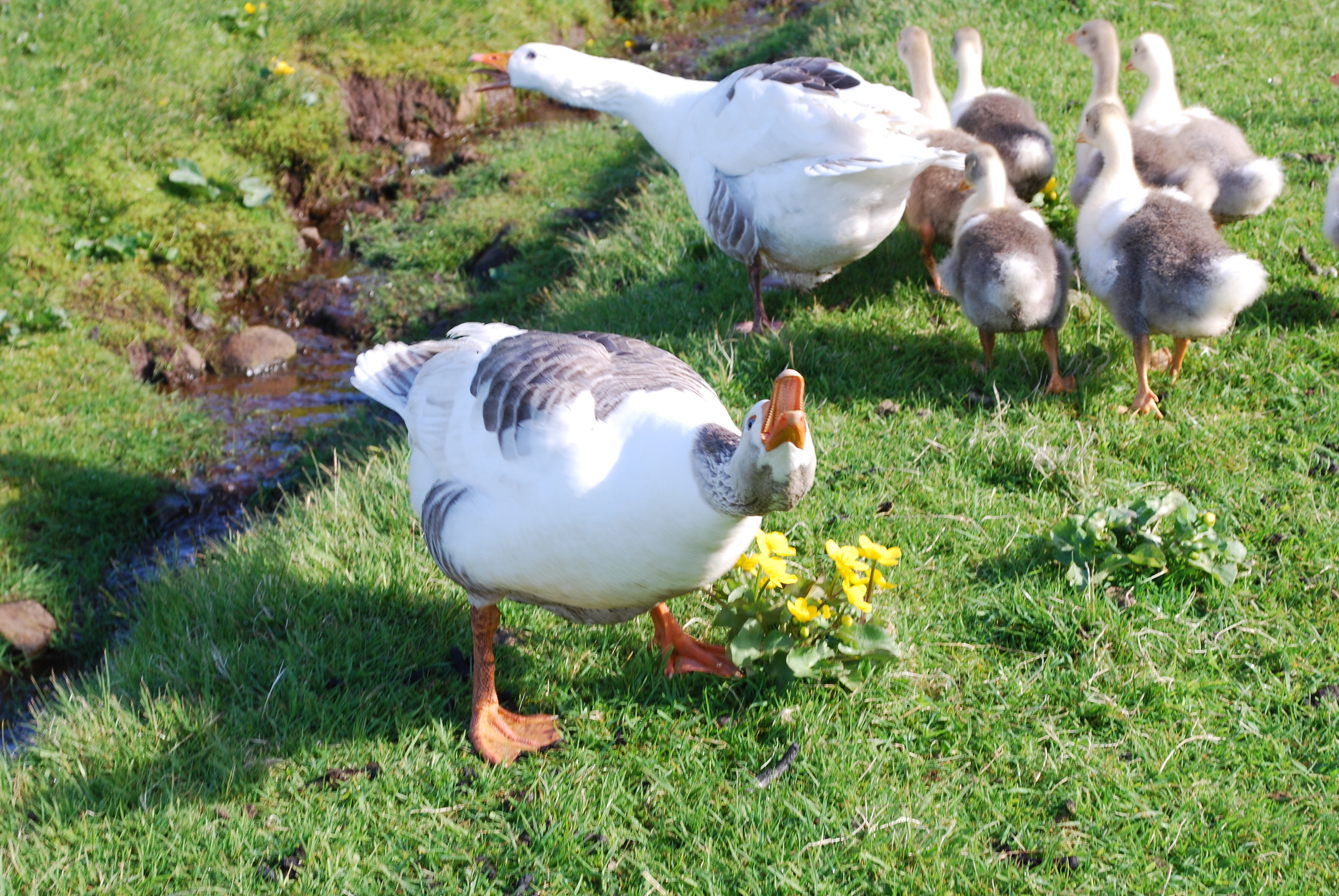
Faroese Goose

== Faroe pony ==
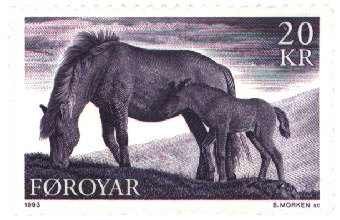
Faroe ponies on a stamp

The Faroe pony (Faroese: føroyska rossið) is a small but strong pony. Its height is between 115–125 centimetres (45–49 in). In the old days it was used as a work horse, carrying heavy loads, but now it is mostly used as a child’s riding horse. In the early 1900s, a lot of ponies were exported to be used as pit ponies. In the 1960s, there were 5-6 pure ponies left; now, with huge effort, there are 73 ponies.

== Faroese cattle ==
The Faroese cattle are small, often black or piebald, and is used for milking. Both sexes of the species have horns.

== Faroese sheep ==
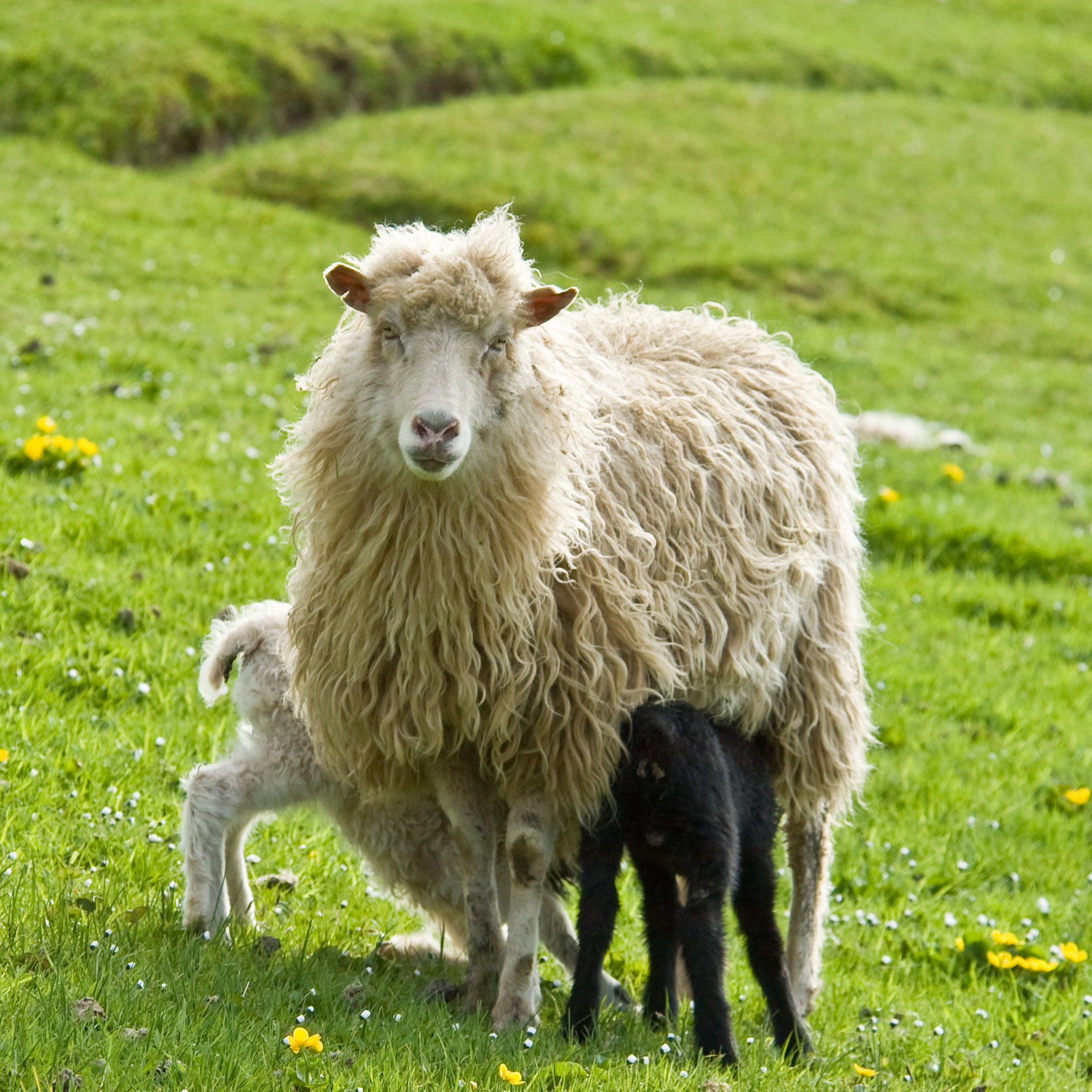
Faroe ewe and her twin lambs

The Faroe sheep is a small and hardy breed. It is one of the Northern European short-tailed sheep and has been on the islands for over 1000 years. The sheep is a huge part of Faroese culture - it is a part of the local cuisine, and might have given the islands their name; Føroyar, the name of the Faroes, is thought to mean "sheep islands." There used to be another sheep breed on the islands, the Lítla Dímun sheep or Dímunarseyðurin, that was smaller and more goat-like in appearance. It lived a feral existence on the island of Lítla Dímun, but all specimens of this breed were shot in the 19th century.

== Faroese goose ==
The Faroese goose is a small goose probably brought to the islands during the settlement of Iceland (Landnám) and is probably the oldest form of tame goose in Europe. It can survive without supplementary feed, but most people give it some food during the winter and during egg laying.

== Faroese duck ==
The Faroese duck is a small, hardy duck; when slaughtered it typically weighs 3 pounds.

== See also ==
- Fauna of the Faroe Islands
