= Naebbetold =

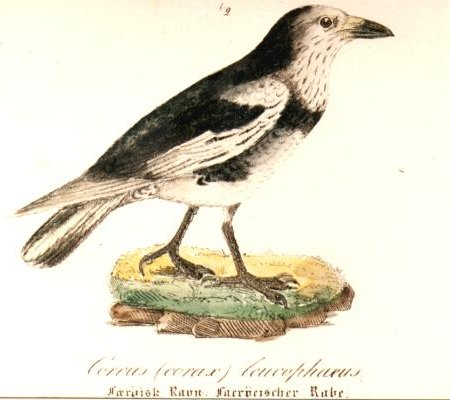
Pied raven of the Faeroes which went extinct by 1902, their extermination was at least partly contributed to by naebbetold

Naebbetold (Norwegian: nebbetol, Faroese: nevtollur/ravnatollur, Danish: næbbetold/næbtold) translated in English as "bill/beak tax" was a bounty and penalty system in the Faroe Islands that was established in ancient times to encourage able-bodied young men to kill birds-of-prey and ravens. This custom became a royal decree in 1741, and the failure of an able-bodied man to annually produce evidence in the form of a beak invoked a penalty. The penalty was abolished in 1881 but rewards for bills continued to be paid into the 20th century. This law or custom is thought to have contributed to the extinction of a variety of the raven that was found on the Faeroes, the pied raven.

== History and impact ==
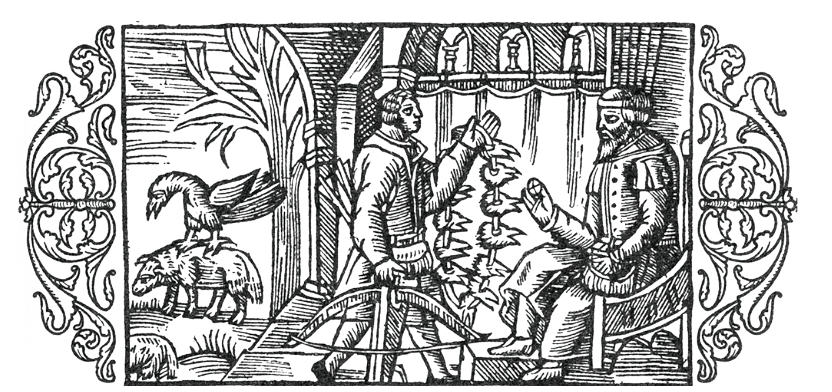
A hunter with raven's heads, from Olaus Magnus's Historia om de nordiska folken (1555)

Predatory birds were hunted across Scandinavia through the Middle Ages and bounties were claimed in exchange for beaks, particularly of ravens. In the 16th century Olaus Magnus noted that the bounty paid was a new arrow for every bird killed. The Danish bounty at the end of the 18th century was 6 skillings for a raven. Naebbetold was imposed in the Faeroes from ancient times (at least the 1300s) to protect sheep (particularly the lambs) and sea birds (mainly puffins and guillemots) whose eggs were harvested. According to English ornithologist Henry Feilden who visited the island in 1872, the agreement was made when a man entered upon when getting onto a boat for the Faeroes. The local governors (Sysselmen/sysselmand, one each for each of the six syslars/districts of the Faeroes) who collected the penalties did not provide proper accounts and this was taken note of in 1686. In 1707 the sysselmen were warned to pay their arrears and after repeated complaints from the islanders of increasing depredations on lambs, a royal decree was passed by King Christian VI on 21 November 1741 requiring the sysselmen to count all the men aged between 15 and 50 and to ensure proper accounting of the naebbetold. Men meeting the criteria had to annually submit evidence of having killed the listed birds in the form of one beak of an eagle, raven or other bird-of-prey; or one raven's brood; or the bills of two crows or two great black-backed gulls. The examination of this evidence was made during the spring assembly in each district and the beaks were brought on St. Olaf's day, 29 July, to Thorshavn where they were destroyed by burning in the presence of a judge. Those who did not provide dead birds had to pay a penalty. The penalty in the original decree was 1 skinn (the value of one sheep skin, and in the mid-19th century equal to a day's wages) or the confiscation of goods but in later times this was a fine of 4 marks (or rigsdaler). Those who lived on Thorshavn were exempted as they neither had land to be confiscated nor owned sheep. Beak tax in the Faeroes covered the raven, the hooded crow, the greater black-backed gull, and the great skua. The number of great skuas fell to four pairs in 1897 resulting in their being removed from the list and placed under protection. Another bird called the "Ørne", thought to be the white-tailed eagle was on the list but this species had already become extinct in the Faeroes by 1700. The naebbetold fines were abolished on 18 March 1881 but rewards continued to be paid against beaks at least until 1934. Danish law no. 34 of 11 March 1892 (“Lov om Ødelæggelse af Ravnenes Yngel på Færøerne") encouraged land owners to destroy the broods of ravens and were fined if they neglected this duty. This law has not been abolished and even until 1970 there were payments of 5 Danish kroner for a raven's beak and 2.5 for other crows. The payments have since stopped but Law number 27 of 9 September 1954 continues to allow the free hunting of ravens, crows and gulls at any time except on Sundays and holidays on the Faeroe Islands.

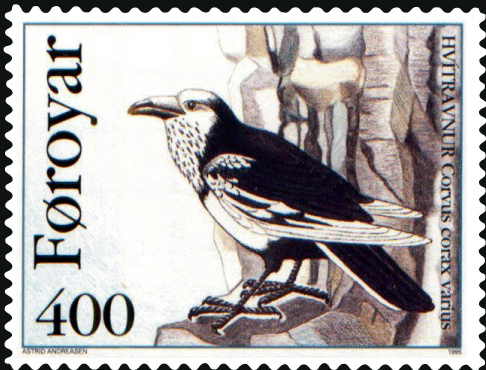
Faeroese stamp of pied raven

Captain Henry W. Feilden visited the island in 1872 and on Osteroe he observed the deposition and destruction of 46 raven bills, 526 of crows, gulls and skuas in one district alone. Since 520 men lived on the island (and the deposit covered only 309 persons) 211 men had to pay the fine of 4 marks. He also reported that in 1869, the Thorshavn collection consisted of the bills of 163 ravens, 1213 crows, 193 blackbacked gulls and 250 skuas. This was then burned with a judge standing witness and he was not allowed to collect a bill of pied raven. The custom of burning of the beaks at Thorshavn on St. Olaf's day was followed until 1866 and after that, as Feilden observed, the burning was carried out earlier at the spring assemblies in the districts themselves. The population of pied ravens in the Faeroes noted for being speckled in white went extinct around 1902. An estimate was made that 45,657 ravens were killed over 189 years with an annual kill of about 242 birds taking a significant number each year of a maximum carrying capacity of about 120 pairs of ravens on the islands.
