= Carl Julian (von) Graba =

German lawyer and ornithologist (1799–1874)

- Born: 17 February 1799; Itzehoe, Duchy of Holstein
- Died: 30 March 1874 (aged 75); Kiel, Schleswig-Holstein
- Occupations: lawyer and civil servant
- Known for: ornithological trip to the Faroe Islands in 1828

Carl Julian (von) Graba (17 February 1799 in Itzehoe – 30 March 1874 in Kiel) was a German lawyer and Royal Danish judicial councillor, and was also a keen ornithologist and one of the first modern researchers to visit and study the Faroe Islands, where he described the local puffin which was subsequently named Fratercula arctica grabae after him. Graba's findings were mentioned in 1872 by Charles Darwin in his book On the Origin of Species.

== Biography ==
Graba, the son of a Danish cavalry colonel, grew up in Itzehoe, Duchy of Holstein, within Schleswig-Holstein in north Germany, which was part of the Danish Kingdom at that time, until 1864. He was educated at the Katharineum of Lübeck, then went on to study law at Kiel University from 1817. After this, he worked as a lawyer in lower courts.

Friedrich Boie, one of his colleagues and also an ornithologist, had travelled to Norway in 1917 to study Norwegian birds, and he persuaded Graba to make a trip to the remote and then almost unknown Danish Faroe Islands, whose birdlife had been little studied. Graba spent three months there in 1828, to investigate what he called the "birds of the North in their home environment", which he imagined would be "even stranger" than the birds of the Hebrides, Orkneys and Shetlands.

=== Visit to the Faroe Islands ===
Graba sailed from Kiel on 23 March 1828 and arrived in Copenhagen on the following day. His onward voyage, scheduled for 28 March, was delayed because of dead calm conditions and he actually sailed on 9 April, reaching Tórshavn, capital of the Faroe Islands, on 18 April.

During his three-month visit, he undertook many excursions to the islands of the Faroes, including Nólsoy, Sandoy, Suduroy, Eysturoy and Streymoy, and he kept careful and meticulous notes, with detailed descriptions of birds he saw, including their weight, measurement and plumage colour. He shot and collected two specimens of white-speckled raven, recording detailed descriptions. He also closely examined two Rock Pigeon specimens from Nólsoy and noted difference in behaviour of wild and domestic pigeons.

He travelled by eight-manned rowing boat, on horseback and on foot, often staying with young Danish priests who would typically spend six years in the Faroes as a passport to good careers back in Denmark. He spent three days in Saksun and then visited the bird cliffs in the Vestmanna mountains, which made a strong impression on him. His notes include many anecdotes about both the bird life and the Faroese people.

Graba observed the traditional drive hunting and killing of pilot whales on 2 July in Tórshavn. He witnessed 300 people in 30 boats slaughtering 80 whales, describing the strategy, wild shouting, courage, bloodlust and fury in the heat of the battle. He also described the taxation and distribution arrangements for the meat.

His return voyage left Tórshavn on 17 July 1828. He arrived off Kiel on 6 August and expressed his relief and delight to be back in familiar surroundings. The final entry in his notes reads "Nach Faro reise ich aber nicht zum zweitenmale" ("I will not travel to the Faroes a second time").

His notes were published in Hamburg in 1830 under the title Tagebuch, geführt auf einer Reise nach Färö im Jahre 1828 (Diary kept on a trip to Farö in 1828), which was translated into Faroese in 1987.

=== Later career ===
After his return, he worked again as a lawyer and civil servant, and later moved to Reinbek near Hamburg. After retiring, he moved back to Kiel, where he died on 30 March 1874.

In 1993, his Faroe Islands book was reprinted in Kiel under the same title. A journalist of the Kieler Nachrichten wrote in 1999: "His small work is still recognized today, after more than 150 years, and not outdated".

Carl Julian von Graba had two sons. One, named Hermann von Graba (1833–1908), was mayor of Glückstadt before becoming district administrator in the Schleswig-Holstein provincial administration.

== Publications ==
- Tagebuch, geführt auf einer Reise nach Färö im Jahre 1828. Perthes & Besser, Hamburg 1830
  - Reprographic reprint: Tagebuch, geführt auf einer Reise nach Färö im Jahre 1828. Annual gift 1993 for the members of the German-Faroese Circle of Friends e. V., Butt, Kiel 1993, ISBN 3-926099-26-7
- Theorie und Praxis des gemeinen deutschen Criminalrechts im neunzehnten Jahrhundert: in merkwürdigen Strafrechtsfällen dargestellt und bearbeitet. (Theory and practice of common German criminal law in the nineteenth century: presented and dealt with in strange criminal cases) Perthes-Besser & Mauke, Hamburg 1838
- Andeutungen, die Reform der Freiheits-Strafen in den Herzogthümern Schleswig und Holstein betreffend. (Hints concerning the reform of the prison sentences in the Duchy of Schleswig and Holstein) Schwers, Kiel 1840
- Actenmäßige Darstellung des wider Jochim Hinrich Ramcke, Anna Maria Ramcke und Hinrich Ladiges aus Halstenbeck wegen Mordes und Brandstiftung geführten Criminalprozesses. (Act-like depiction of the criminal trial conducted against Jochim Hinrich Ramcke, Anna Maria Ramcke and Hinrich Ladiges from Halstenbeck for murder and arson) Bünsow, Kiel 1844
- Hartwig von Reventlau. Dramatische Dichtung in 5 Acten. Schwerssche Buchhandlung, Kiel 1846

== See also ==
- Fauna of the Faroe Islands
