= Faroese goose =

Breed of goose

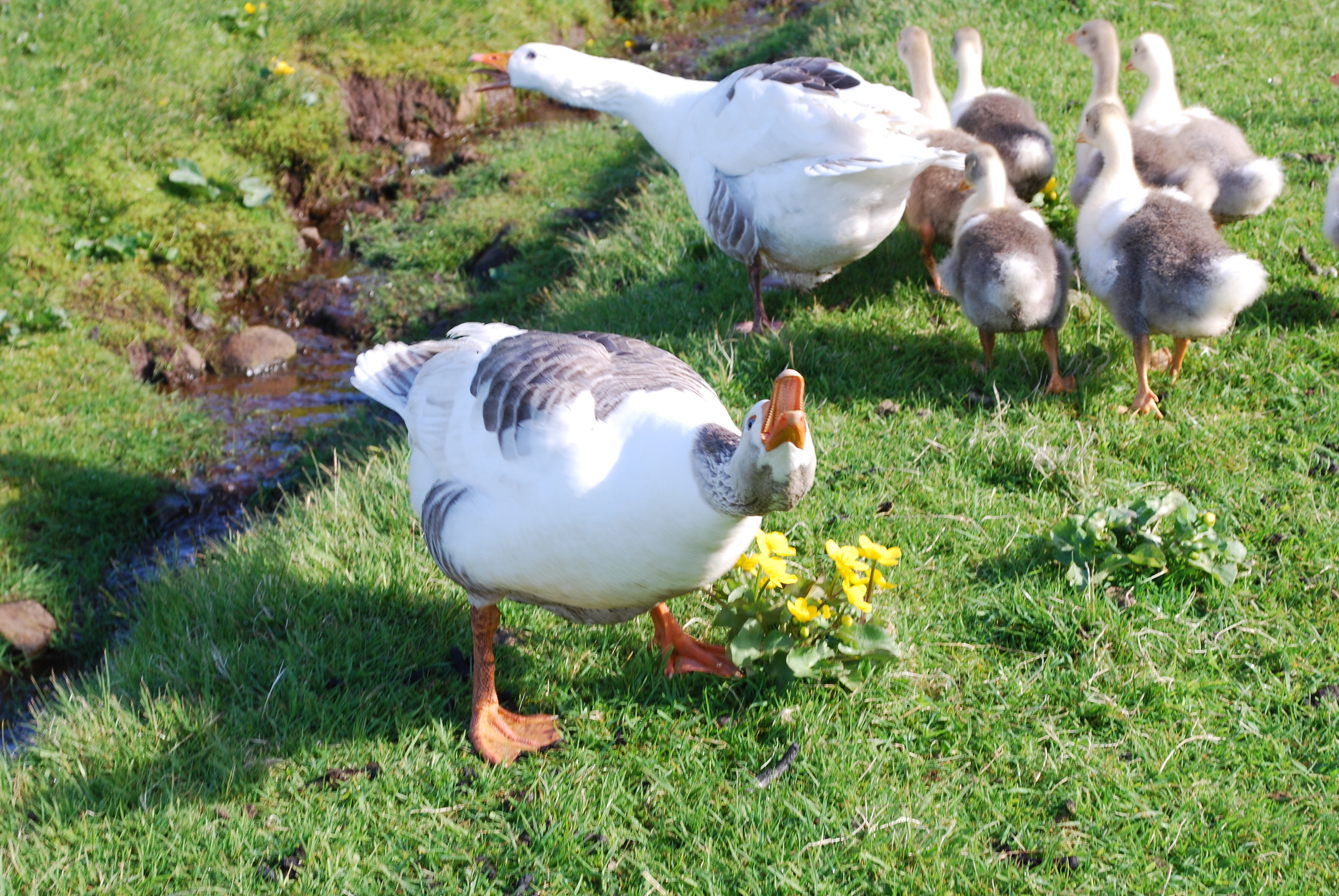
A Faroese goose family

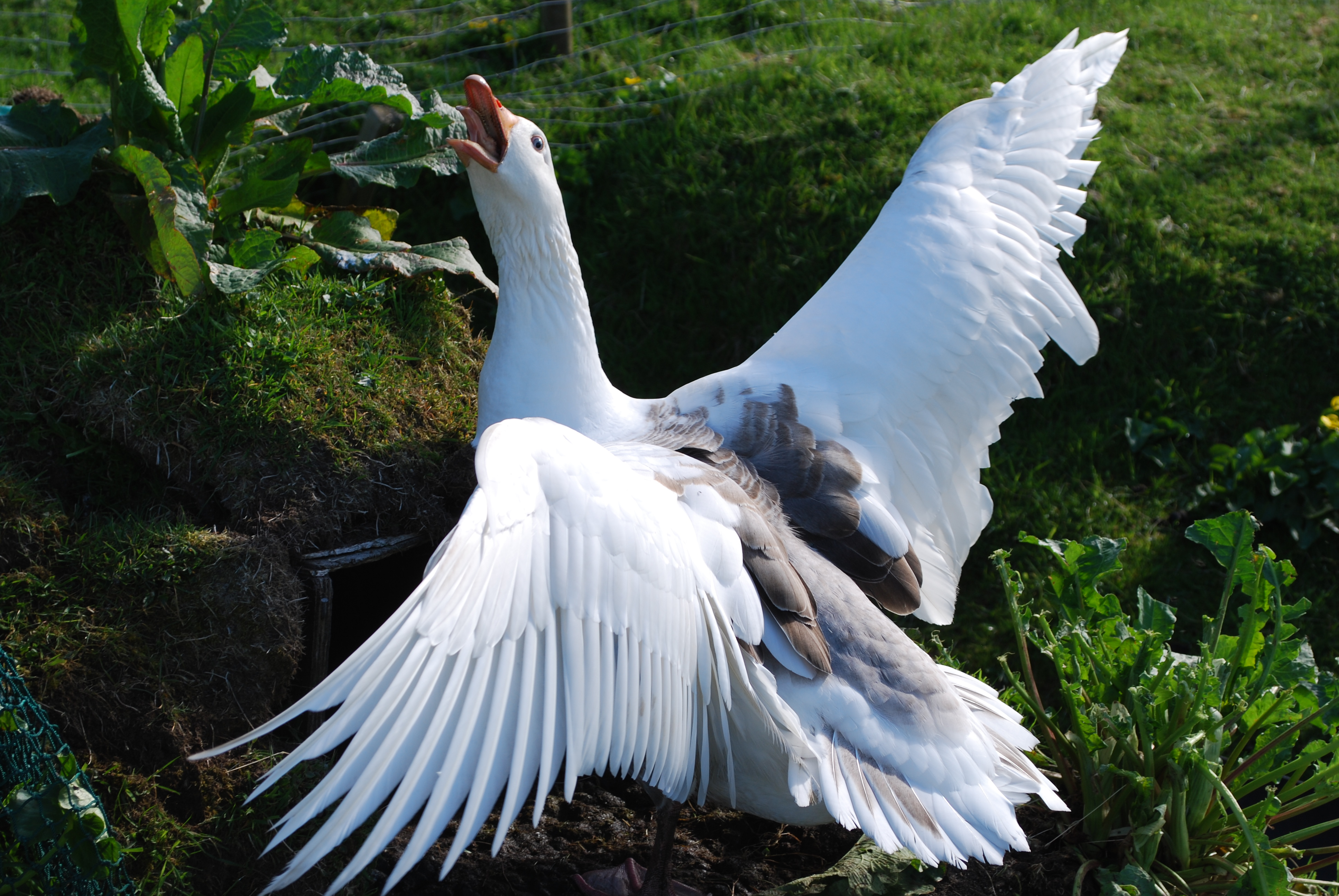
Goose in defensive position

The Faroese goose (Faroese: føroyska gásin) is probably the oldest form of tame goose in Europe and possibly the direct descendants of the tame geese that the Landnám folk brought from Scandinavia and the British Isles.

Since the Faroe Islands have no native predators that are capable of killing the geese, a special "goose culture" has developed in the Faroe Islands, which has no equivalent in neighboring countries. From May to October one can see flocks of geese walking freely in the outfields, where they feed on the short summer grass without any supplementary feeding.

In winter the geese move freely in the cultivated infields of the villages, which in some cases is of such good quality that earlier the geese did not need complementary feed in the winter. In most places, however, caretakers provide supplementary food just before and during egg laying and when snow is on the ground. The properties of today's Faroese geese result from natural selection over centuries, where only the most well-adapted birds reproduced.

== Properties ==
In Nordisk Genbank Husdyr, the breed is described as a "not too large and not at all rough built, but otherwise it must not be refined and neat. Is very hardy and resistant to weather and disease and tolerates a harsh climate. It is hardy, very food-seeking and it has good juicy meat. Is somewhat temperamental, awake and guarding and will preferably be left alone during the breeding season." Further descriptions of the breed's phenotypic court detail: Gase 5–5,5 kg, (11-12 lbs) Goose: 4–4,5 kg, (8.8-9.9 lbs) Egg weight: 130 grams or 4.5 ounces.

Most of the Faroese geese are slaughtered in December at a weight of 4–5 kg or 9-11 pounds. After three to four weeks of fattening the chicks are slaughtered. Earlier, most got lightly salted or wind-dried for winter supplies, and the goose is a Christmas table favorite.

== See also ==
- Faroe Islands domestic animals
