= University of Copenhagen Zoological Museum =

Coordinates: 55°42′09″N 12°33′33″E

- Zoologisk museum
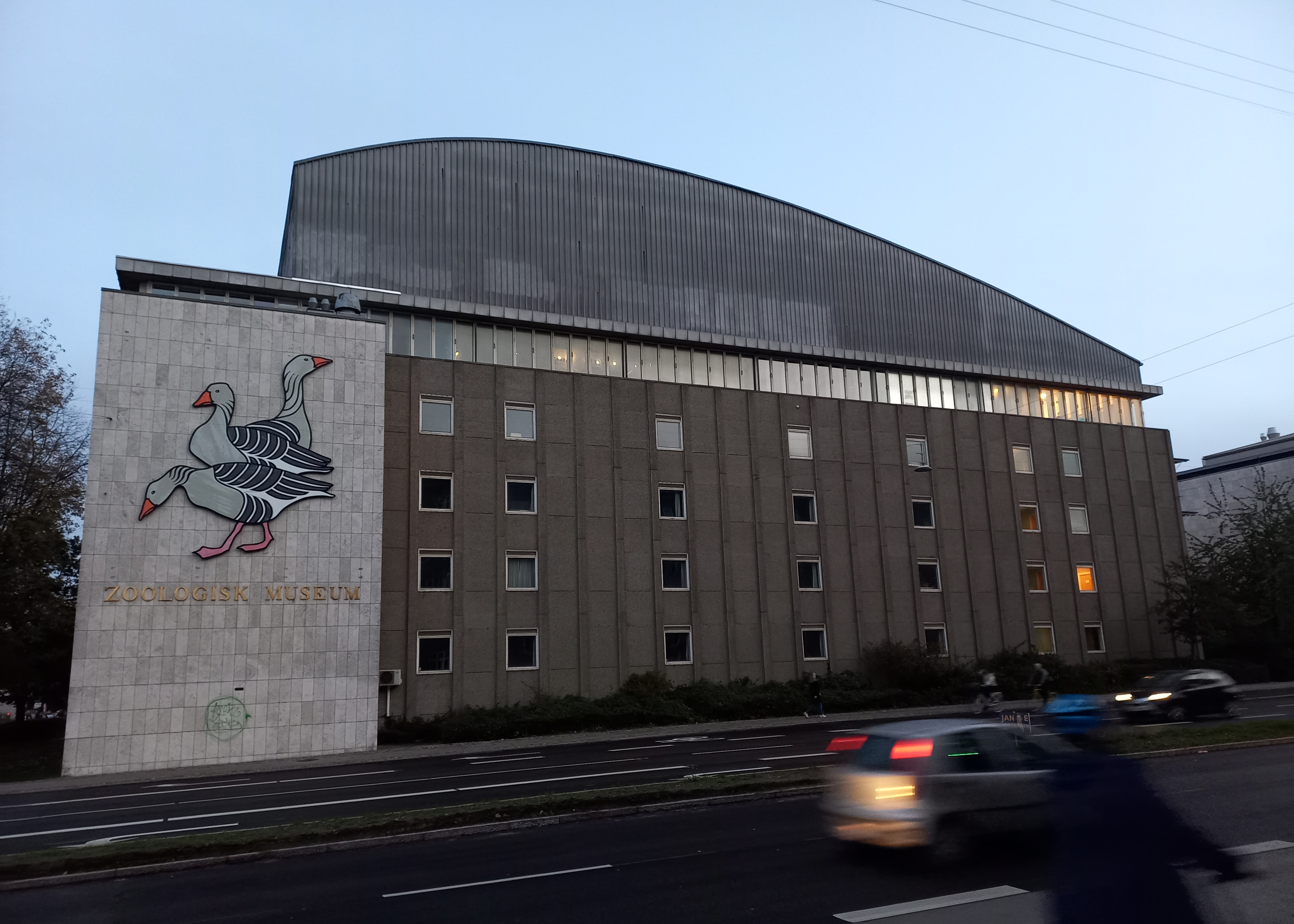
- The museum the day before its final closure in 2022 (will reopen in 2025 at a separate location)
- Established: 1862; 164 years ago
- Location: Universitetsparken 15, 2100 Copenhagen, Denmark
- Type: Natural history museum
- Director: Nina Rønsted
- Website: zoologi.snm.ku.dk

The Copenhagen Zoological Museum (Danish: Zoologisk Museum) was a separate zoological museum in Copenhagen, Denmark. It is now a part of the Natural History Museum of Denmark, which is affiliated with the University of Copenhagen. The separate museum location closed in 2022, but will reopen in 2025 (as part of the combined Natural History Museum) in new and considerably larger buildings in the northeastern corner of the Copenhagen Botanical Garden. Although the museum will be relocated, the research and storage facilities at its old location have been maintained.

== History ==
The Zoological Museum is among the world's oldest natural history museums, as its collection was started by Ole Worm more than 350 years ago, although it was officially founded in 1862.

The Zoological Museum closed in October 2022 as part of the preparations for the new museum building in the Botanical Garden, which will open to the public on March 6th 2027. The new museum will bring together botany, zoology, and geology under one roof.

== Collections ==
The zoological collections contains about 14 million specimens. The history of the collections reach back in time more than 200 years. Apart from rich collections of Danish animals, the museum has particularly strong representation of:

- The North Atlantic and Arctic (especially Greenland)
- The former Danish colonies in the West Indies
- East Africa (especially the Eastern Arc mountains)
- South American insects (especially butterflies)
- Philippines, Bismarck and Solomon Islands
- Deep Sea faunas
- Whale skeletons
- Material from several expeditions; Ingolf 1892, Galathea 2 (1950–52), Atlantide (1932), P.W. Lund (Lagoa Santa 1832–44)

== Exhibitions ==
The Zoological Museum's permanent exhibition 'From pole to pole' showed animals from around the world in big displays. There was also a Charles Darwin exhibition (with the largest collection of Darwin specimens, mainly barnacles, outside the Natural History Museum, London) and collections covering animals in the Danish Realm. The museum has many important remains of recently extinct birds in storage, including the eyes and internal organs of the last two great auks, several specimens of the pied raven, and one of only two known complete skulls of the dodos that were taken to Europe in the 17th century. Other notable examples include the only known specimen of the spider Pardosa danica, some of the first discovered remains of the saola, and fossils of ancient animals like the transitional Ichthyostega and a Diplodocus nicknamed "Misty".

== Gallery ==
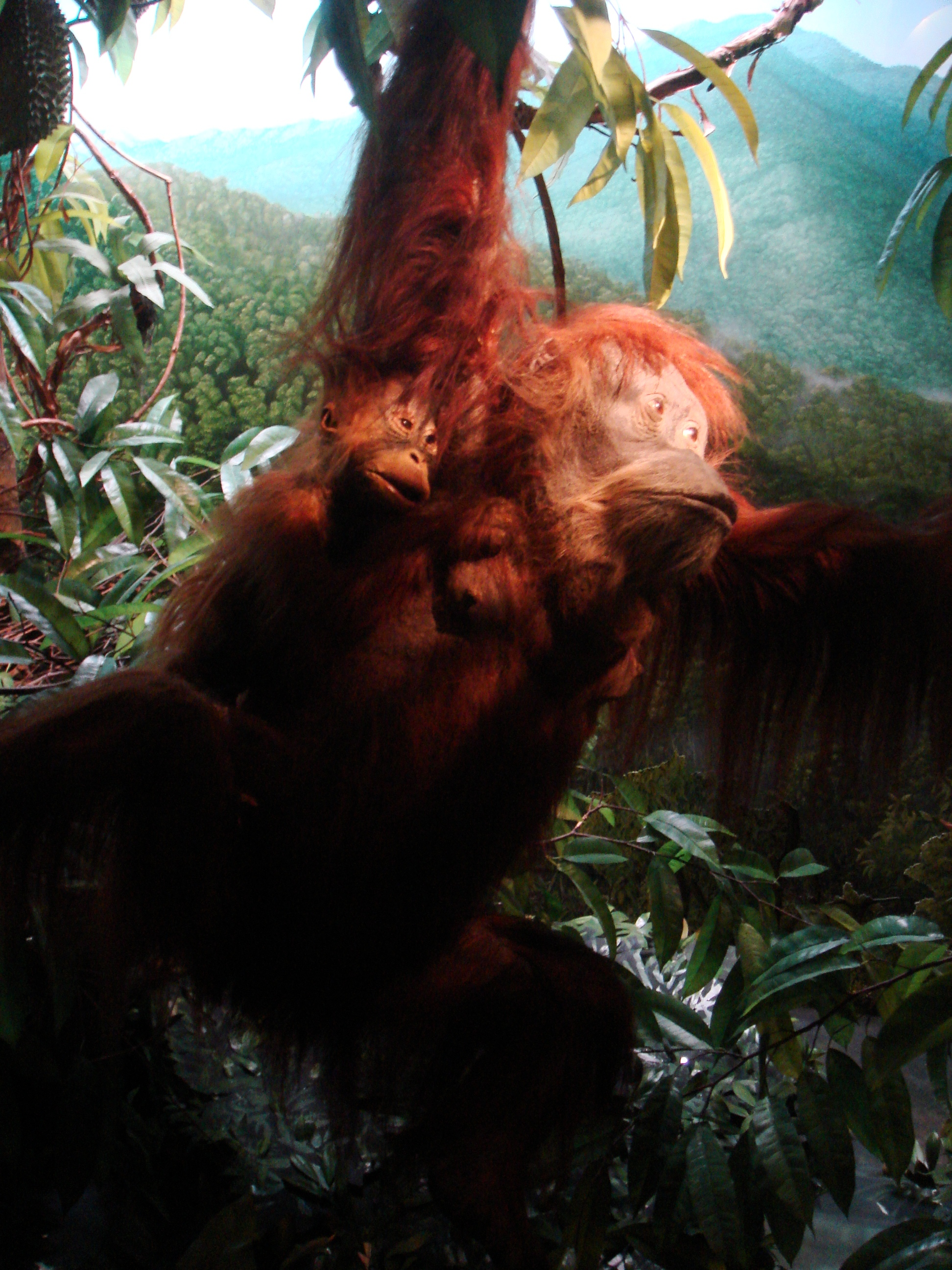
Rain forest with orangutan

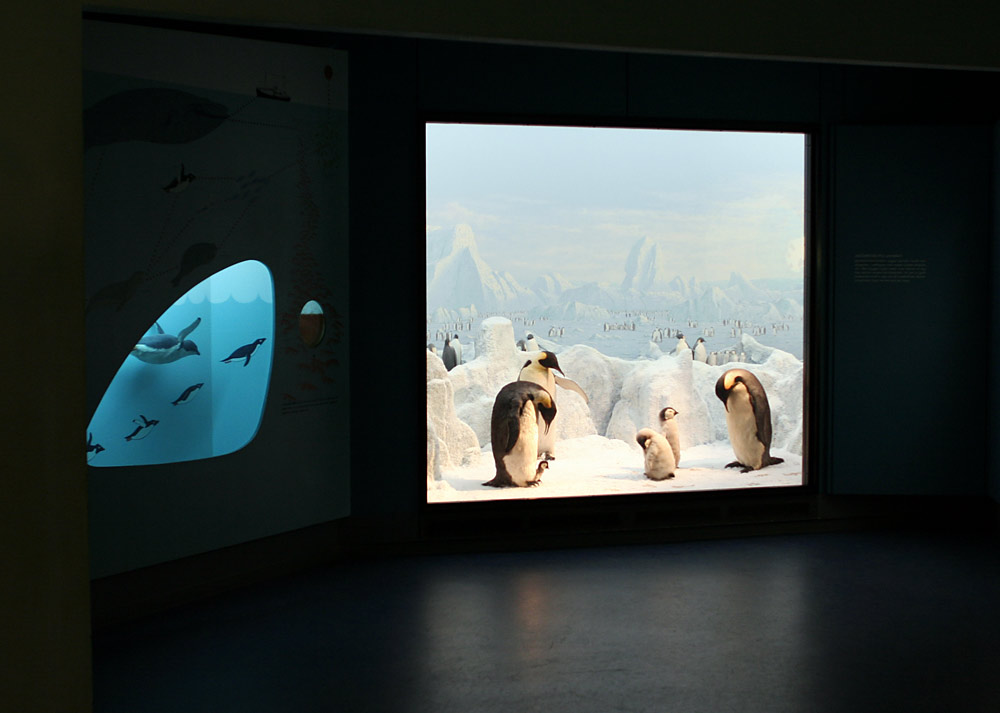
Antarctic display with penguins

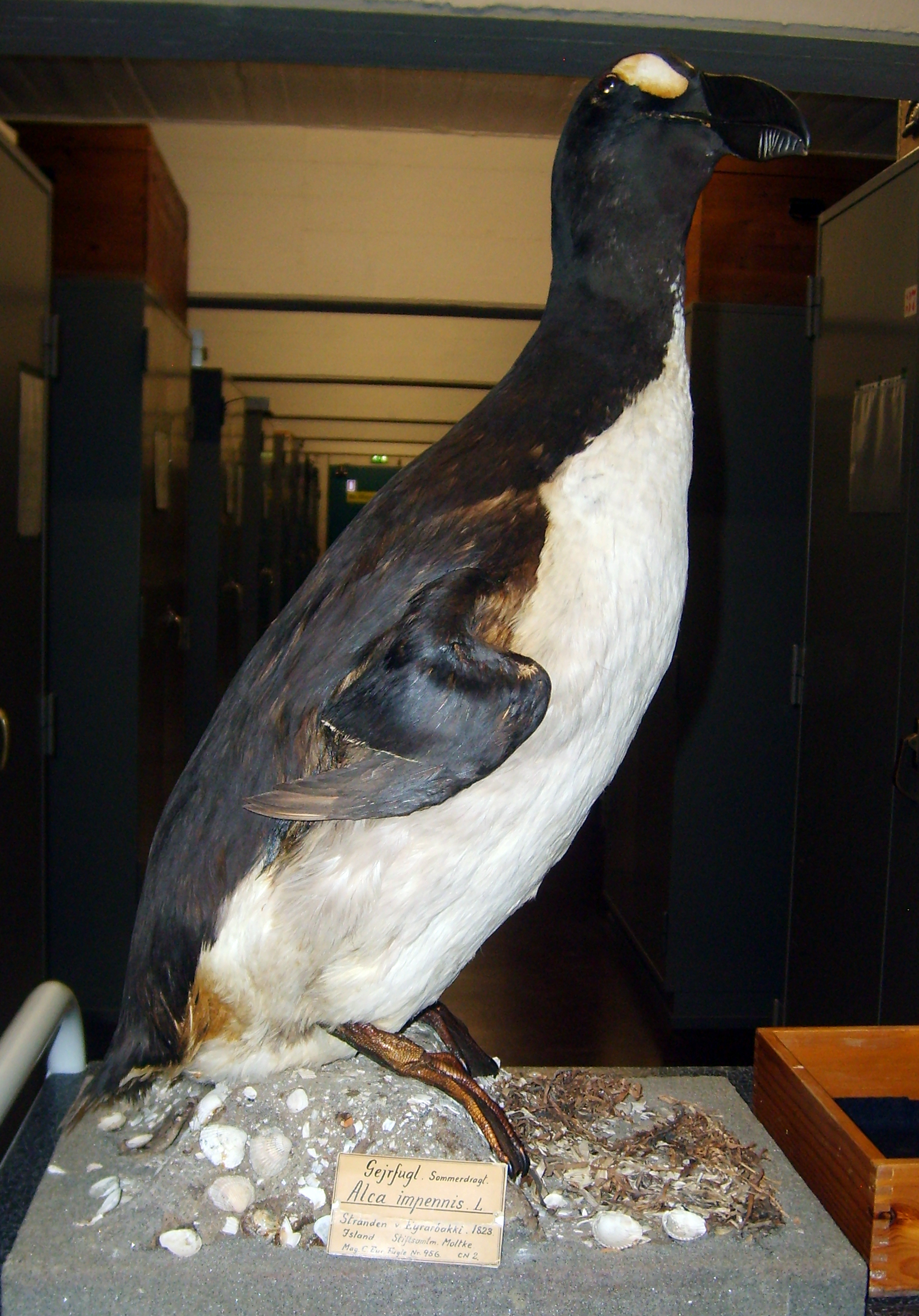
One of two taxidermied great auks at the museum

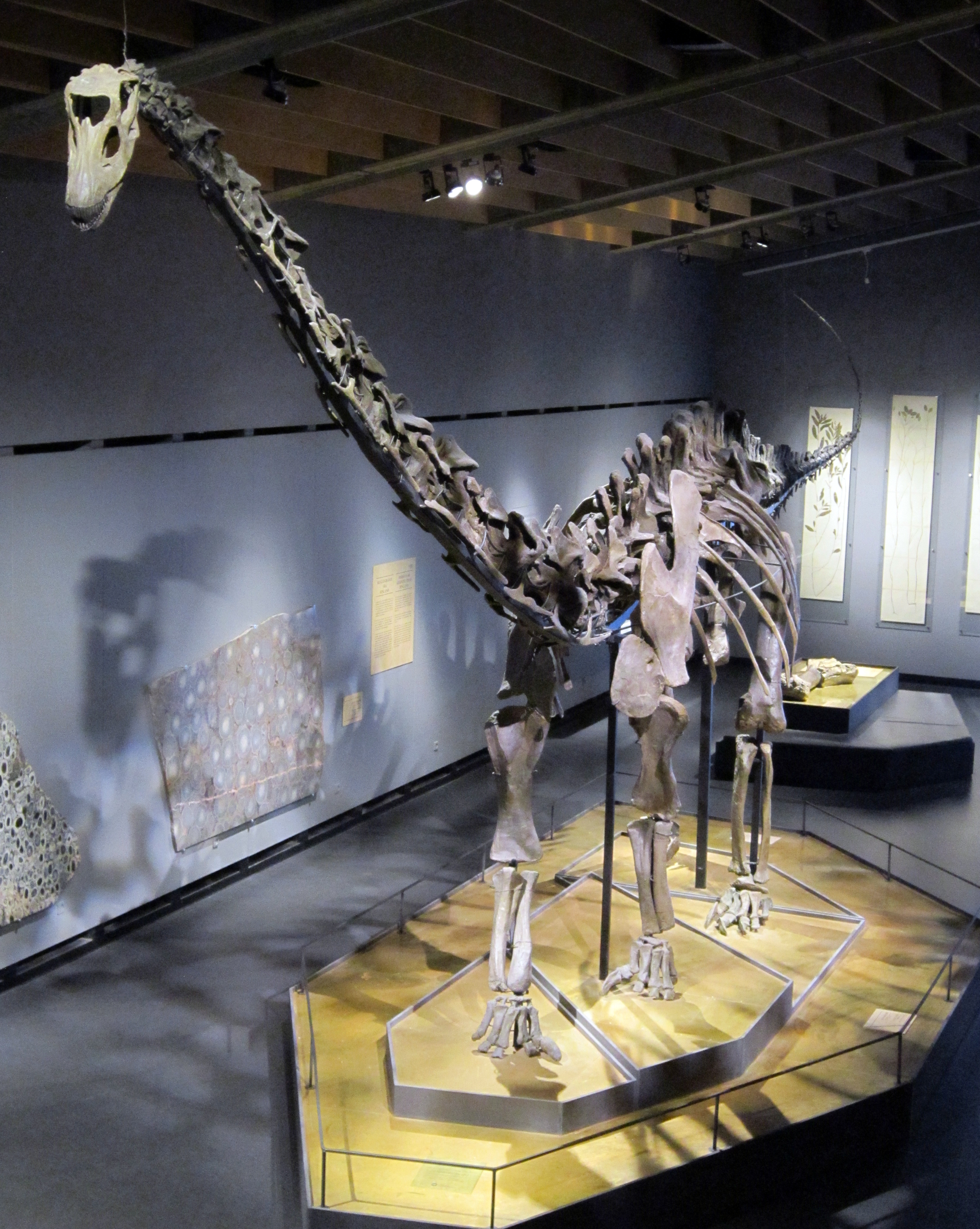
"Misty", a Diplodocus dinosaur

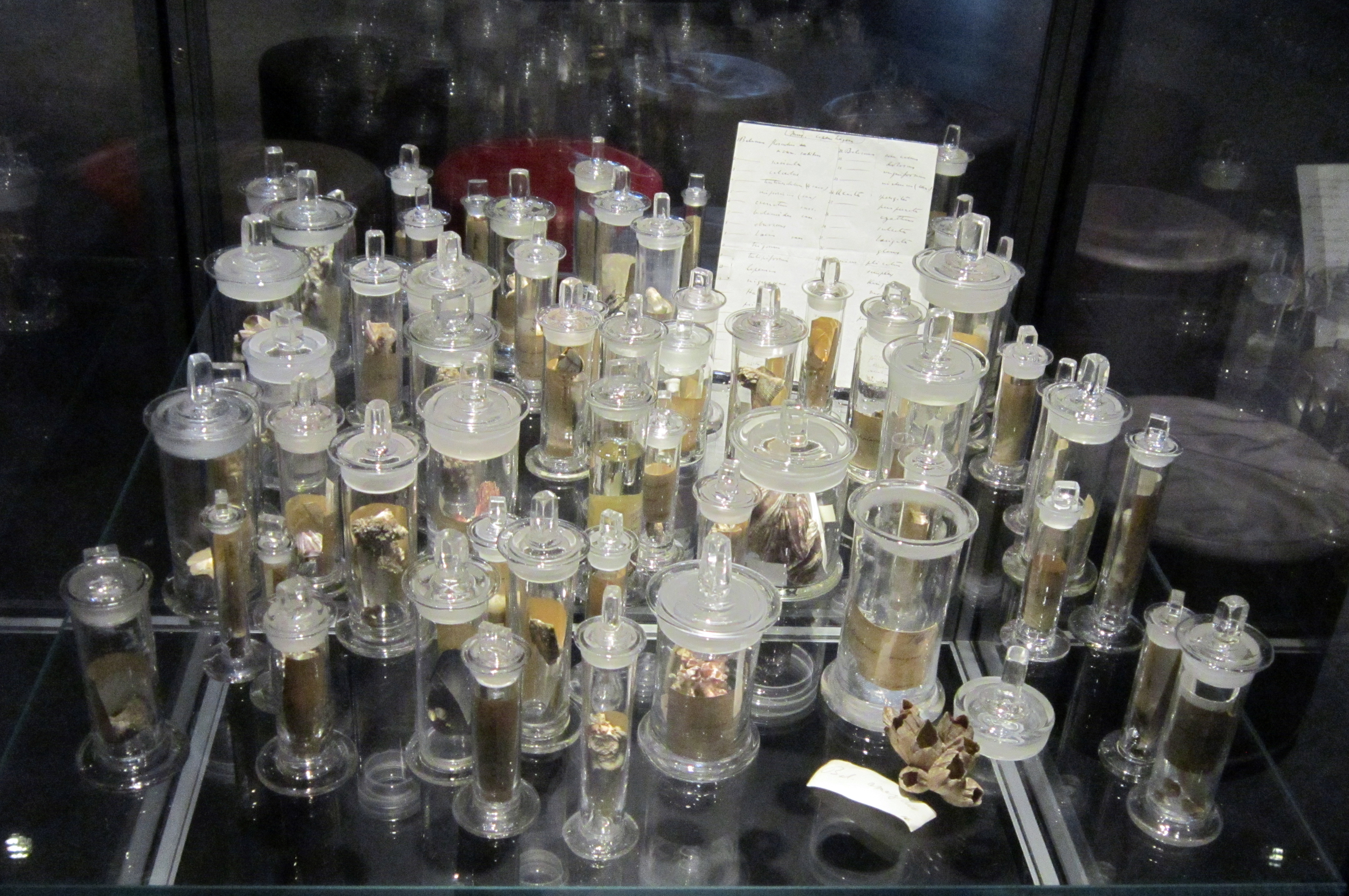
Barnacles from Charles Darwin's collection, gifted to scientists at the university in 1854

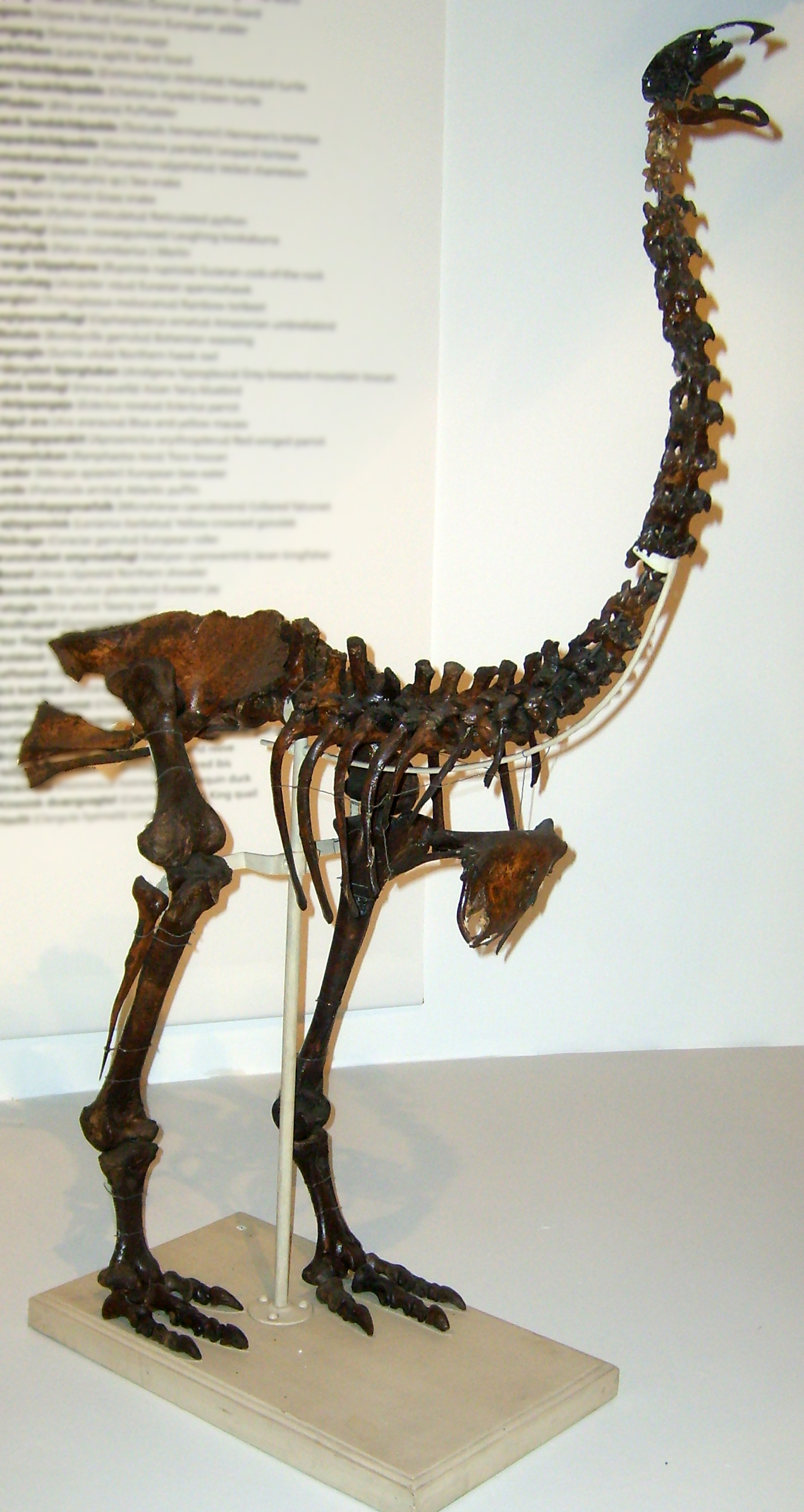
Skeleton of an eastern moa, a species that was hunted to extinction shortly after the first humans arrived in New Zealand

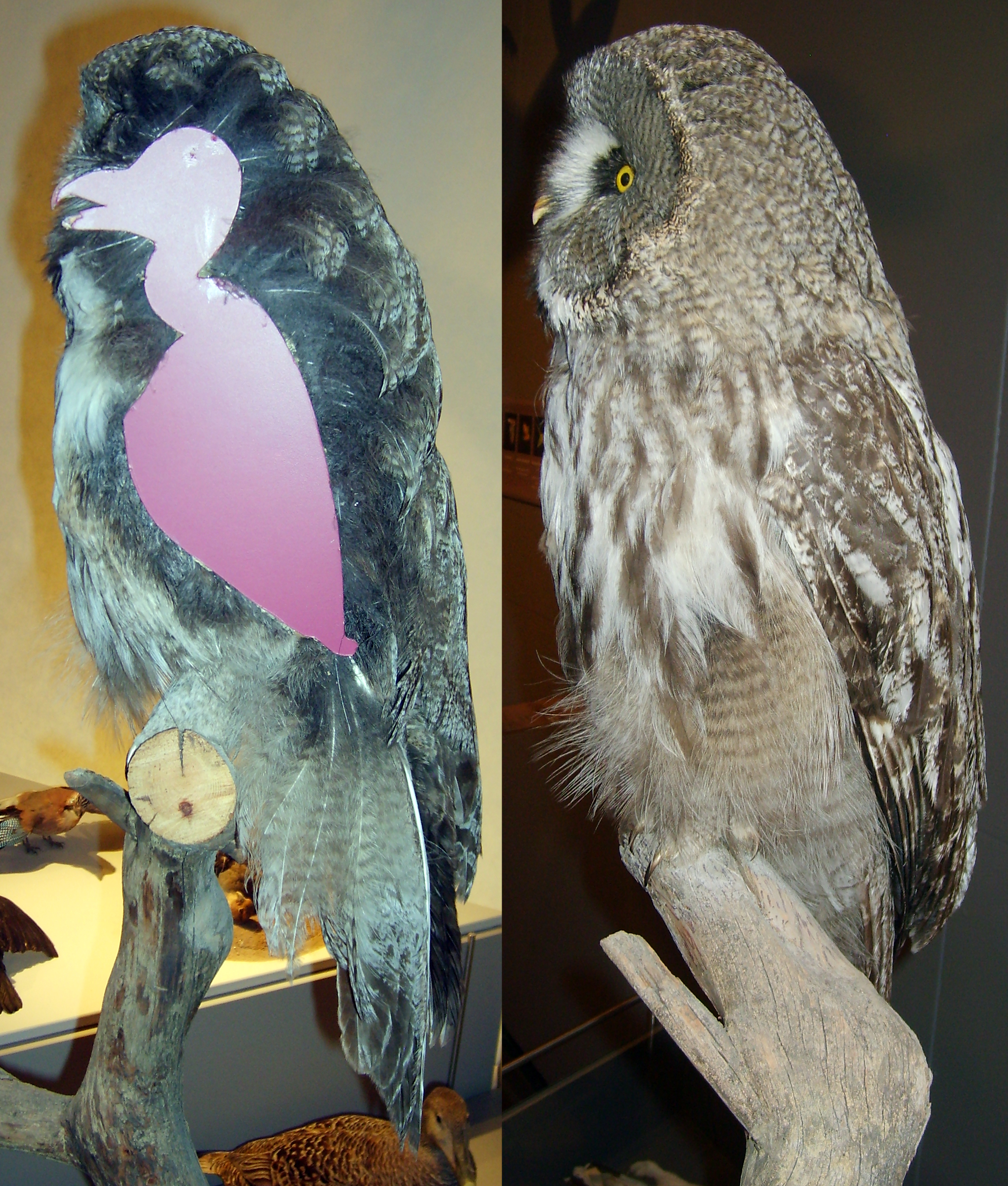
Great grey owl, showing its body-size compared to its plumage

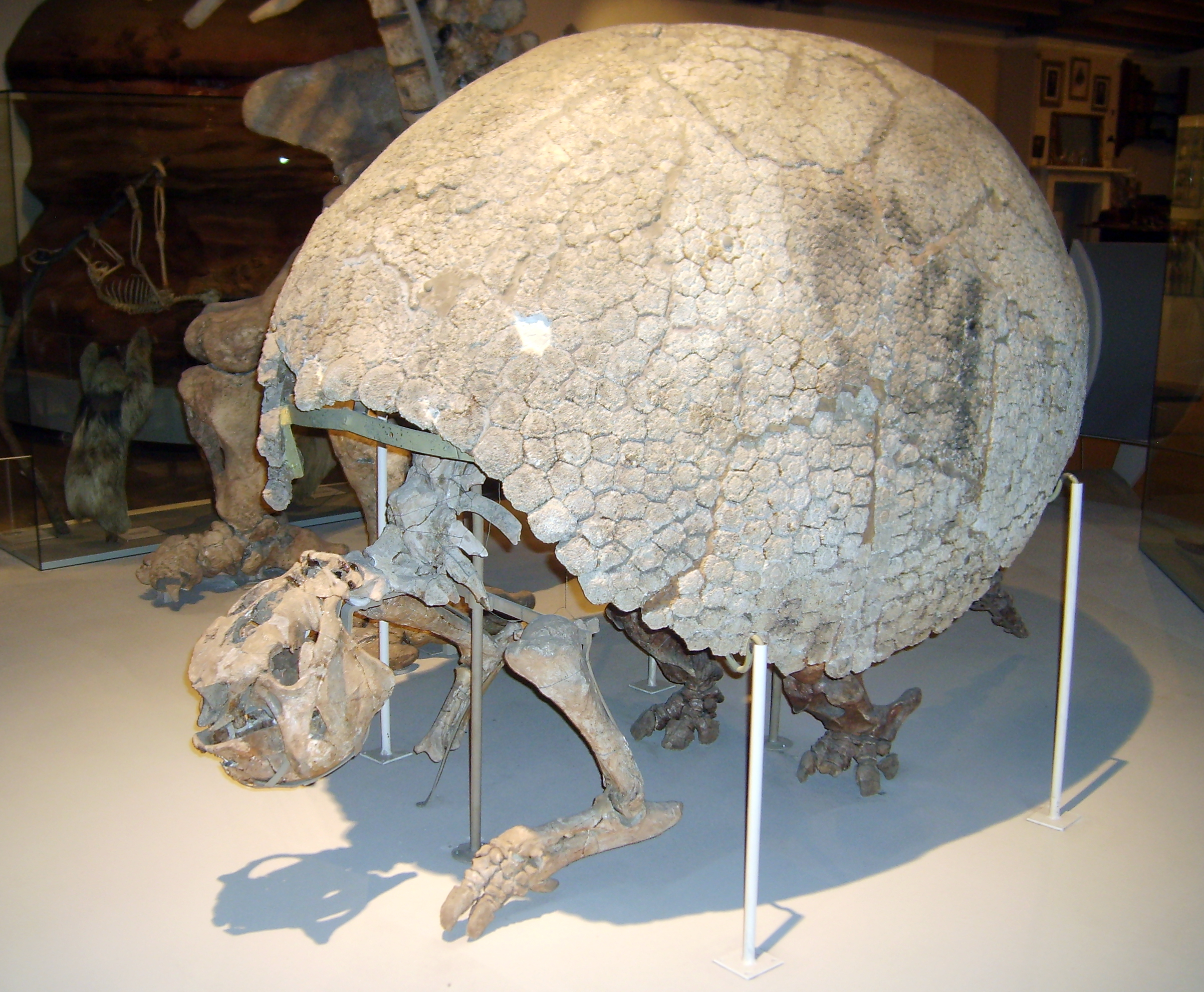
Glyptodon (shown) and saber-toothed cats are among the important prehistoric specimens collected by Peter Wilhelm Lund
