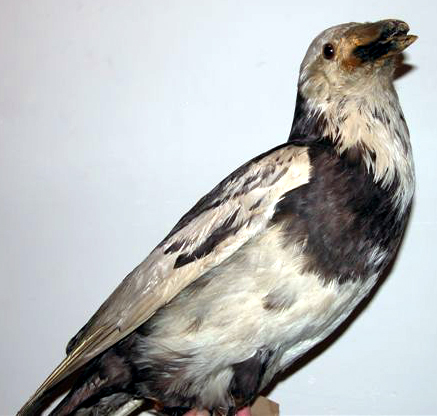
- Pied raven type specimen, shot 24 September 1869. Zoologisk Museum, Copenhagen

Conservation status
- Extinct (1902)

Scientific classification
- Kingdom: Animalia
- Phylum: Chordata
- Class: Aves
- Order: Passeriformes
- Family: Corvidae
- Genus: Corvus
- Species: C. corax
- Subspecies: C. c. varius
- Population: †Corvus corax varius morpha leucophaeus

= Pied raven =

Extinct variant of bird

The pied raven (Corvus corax varius morpha leucophaeus) is an extinct colour morph of the North Atlantic subspecies of the common raven that was only found on the Faroe Islands. The last confirmed record was in 1902. The pied raven had large areas of white feathering, most frequently on the head, the wings and the belly, and its beak was light brown. Apart from that, it looked like the all-black North Atlantic ravens (C. c. varius morpha typicus), which remains widespread in the Faroe Islands and are also found in Iceland.

== History ==
The pied raven received binomial names such as Corvus leucophaeus (by Vieillot, 1817) and Corvus leucomelas (by Wagler, 1827). It is currently referred to as Corvus corax varius morpha leucophaeus.

== Description ==
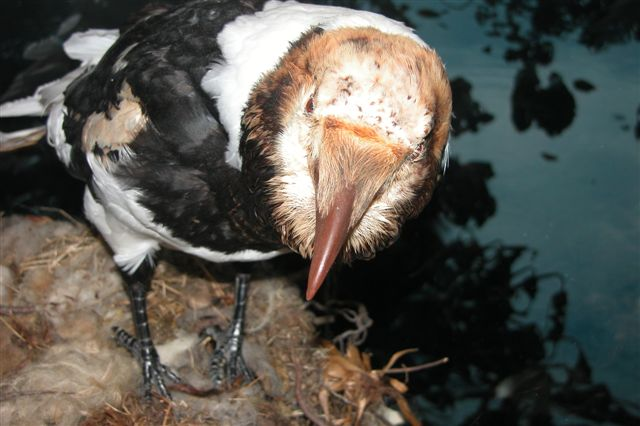
Replica pied raven specimen at the Føroya Náttúrugripasavn.

In modern Faroese, the bird is called hvítravnur ("white raven"), older name gorpur bringu hvíti ("white-chested corbie"). Normal individuals of the subspecies varius, which is found on Iceland and the Faroe Islands, already show a tendency towards more extensive white feather bases compared with the nominate subspecies. But, only on the Faroes, a mutation in the melanin metabolism would become fixed in the population, causing some birds to have about half of their feathers entirely white. While albinotic specimens sometimes occur in bird populations, the pied raven seems not to have been based on such occasional "sports", but on a constantly or at least regularly present part of the local raven population.

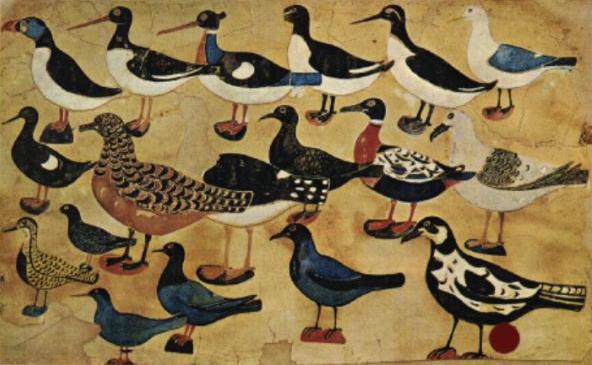
Skarvanesi's 18 fuglar with the pied raven in the lower right corner

The first record of the pied raven seems to be in the pre-1500 kvæði Fuglakvæði eldra ("The elder ballad of birds") which mentions 40 local species, including the great auk. Later, the pied raven is mentioned in the reports of Lucas Debes (1673) and Jens Christian Svabo (1781/82). Carl Julian von Graba in 1828 speaks of ten individuals he saw himself and states that these birds, while less numerous than the black morph, were quite common.

Díðrikur á Skarvanesi, the Faroe painter, painted the Fuglar series, a number of portrayal of birds. On his 18 fuglar ("18 birds"), the animal in the lower right corner can be identified as a pied raven. The painting is currently on display in the Listaskálin museum of Faroe art in Tórshavn.

== Extinction ==
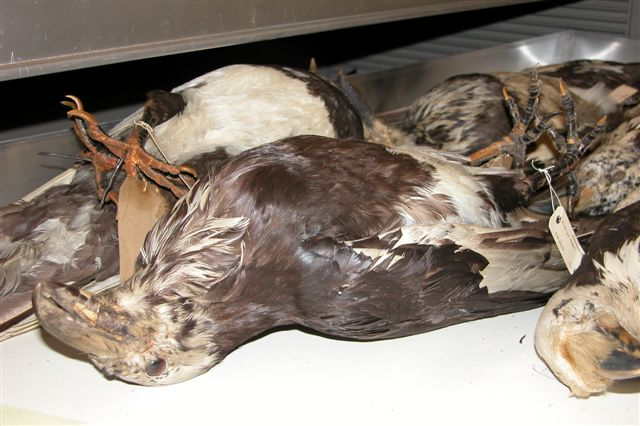
The 6 Zoologisk Museum specimens

As exemplified by Skarvanesi's painting, which obviously was done from stuffed birds, the pied raven was an object of interest to collectors. During the nineteenth century, the pied birds were selectively shot because they could fetch high prices; the sýslumaður (sheriff) of Streymoy, Hans Christopher Müller once paid two Danish rigsdaler for a stuffed specimen from Nólsoy. Such sums, a healthy amount of money for the impoverished Faroe farmers, made shooting a pied raven a profitable enterprise. Additionally, ravens in general were hunted as pests. In the mid-eighteenth century, every Faroe male of hunting age was ordered by royal decree (see Naebbetold) to shoot at least one raven or two other predatory birds per year or be fined four skillings. The last confirmed pied raven was shot on November 2, 1902, on Mykines. Subsequently, there were a few reported sightings of white ravens: in the autumn of 1916 on Velbastaður and Koltur, in the winter of 1947 on Nólsoy and again sighted the next year, and in the spring of 1965 on Sandvík. Because none of these sight records mentioned the unique black-and-white pattern and a small number of diluted, all-whitish ravens have been observed in recent decades in the Faroe Islands, none of these are officially recognised as pied ravens. Consequently, 1902 is generally considered as the year of extinction for the pied raven.

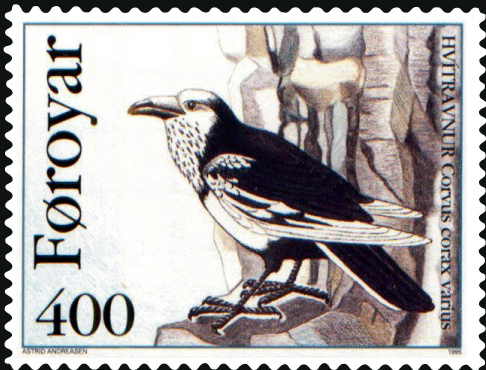
The pied raven on Faroe postal stamp FR 276

The pied raven, being a colour variation, likely only differed in one or very few alleles (as opposed to numerous genes in a true subspecies) from the black birds. The "piebald" allele(s) was or were presumably recessive or (if more than one) only caused the novel coloration if they were all present. This is supported by the last sightings which occurred in the absence of a regular breeding population of piebald birds, and the observations of H. C. Müller. Thus, it is not certain that the form is indeed extinct, if one can speak of "extinction" in any but a population genetical sense anyway. Theoretically, the allele(s) could still be present but hidden in black individuals of the subspecies and thus, a pied raven could once again be born one day. Although the raven remains fairly common in the Faroes, its population in the small archipelago is, however, only 200–300 breeding pairs. Because ravens with a diluted, all-whitish plumage have been sighted in the Faroes, also in recent decades, the alleles for that aberrancy still exists in the archipelago, but this is unlikely to be the same genes involved in the pied pattern. Corvids with a diluted plumage occur with some regularity in many countries.

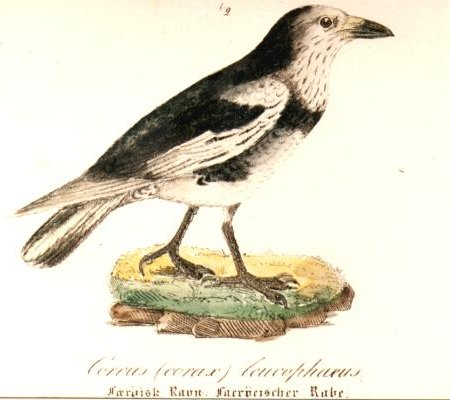
Illustration from the 1850s

Today, 16 museum specimens of the pied raven are known: six in the Zoologisk Museum (Copenhagen, Denmark); four in the American Museum of Natural History (New York, United States); two in the Museum of Evolution (Uppsala, Sweden); one in the Naturalis Biodiversity Center (Leiden, the Netherlands); one in State Natural History Museum (Braunschweig, Germany); one in the State Museum of Zoology (Dresden, Germany); and one in the Manchester Museum (Manchester, United Kingdom). On June 12, 1995, the Postverk Føroya issued the postal stamp FR 276, which featured a pied raven. It was designed by the famous Faroese artist and scientific illustrator Astrid Andreasen.
