= Faroe pony =

Breed of horse

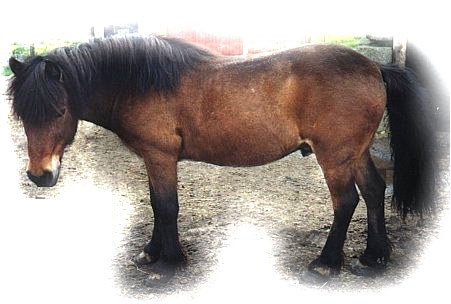

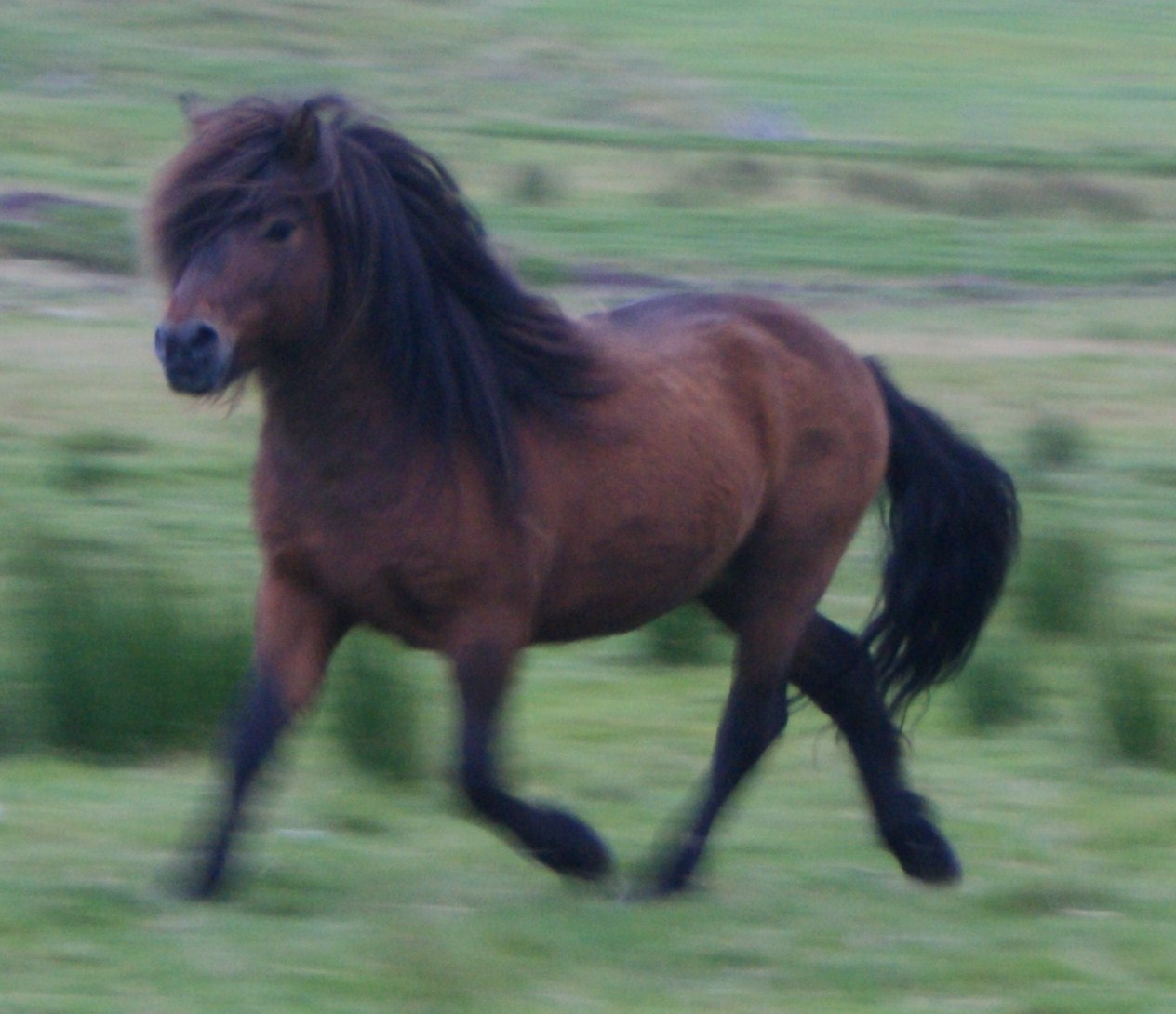
- Other names: Faeroes pony; Faroese horse; Färöerpony; Faeroe Island Horse; Føroyski Hesturin
- Country of origin: Faroe Islands

The Faroe pony, Faeroes pony, or Faroese horse, (Føroyska rossið) is a small pony, with a height between 11.1 to 12.1 hands (45 to 49 inches, 114 to 124 cm). Technically this animal is a pony due to its height, but in the Faroe Islands it is called a horse because of its strength. Since the Faroe pony only lives on the Faroes, it is not well known in other countries. In 2021, there were only 94 Faroe ponies left living on the Faroes.

== Features ==
The colours of the pony may vary, but they are mainly chestnut brown, black or speckled, with some white ones found in previous populations. It is known to be a very enduring, strong, friendly, adaptable and sure-footed breed with four gaits including the tölt, an ambling gait which it shares with the Icelandic horse. A fully grown Faroe horse weighs 250-300 kilograms. Its winter coat is very long, dense and water repellent, while the summer coat is shorthaired and smooth.

== History ==
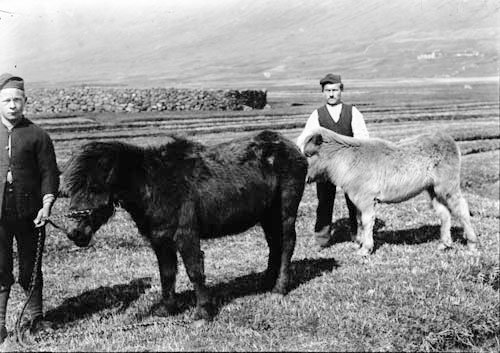
Faroe ponies in Hvalvík, c. 1898

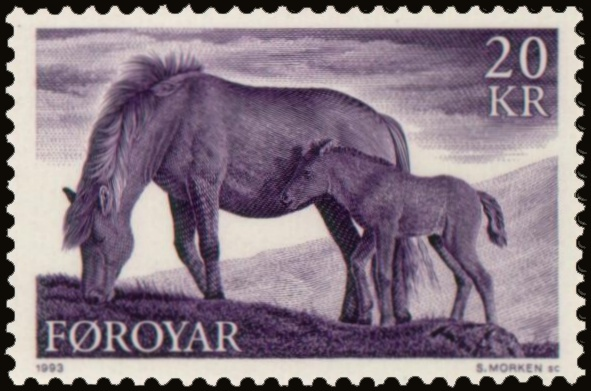
Faroe horses are an iconic image of the Faroe Islands

The Faroe pony is mentioned in written sources from the 1600s. It was previously used to carry or haul heavy loads at farms and some sources also describe it being trained to herd sheep (known as tøkuhestar). When it was not at work, it was released onto the mountains where it roamed freely. Today it is kept only by hobby breeders and mostly used as a riding horse for children.

The Faroe pony has been living on the Faroes for many centuries. In 1880 more than 800 animals were registered on the Faroe Islands, but by the 1960s the population had been decimated to only five to six horses. One of the reasons was an extensive horse export from 1850 - 1920, for use in the mining industry (as pit ponies) in the United Kingdom. A conservation and breeding program was initiated by Leivur T. Hansen and in 1978 the organization Felagið Føroysk Ross (Breeders of Faroe Ponies) was established. Thanks to large scale efforts, the Faroe pony population increased to 70 animals in 2015, which were declared genetically pure, with 14 breeding stallions and the aim to maintain and develop the breed further. The low population is at risk for inbreeding and approval for export may improve genetic diversity.

== See also ==
- Fjord horse
- Nordlandshest/Lyngshest
- Icelandic horse
- Faroe Islands domestic animals
