= Faroese shawl =

Traditional piece of clothing from the Faroe Islands

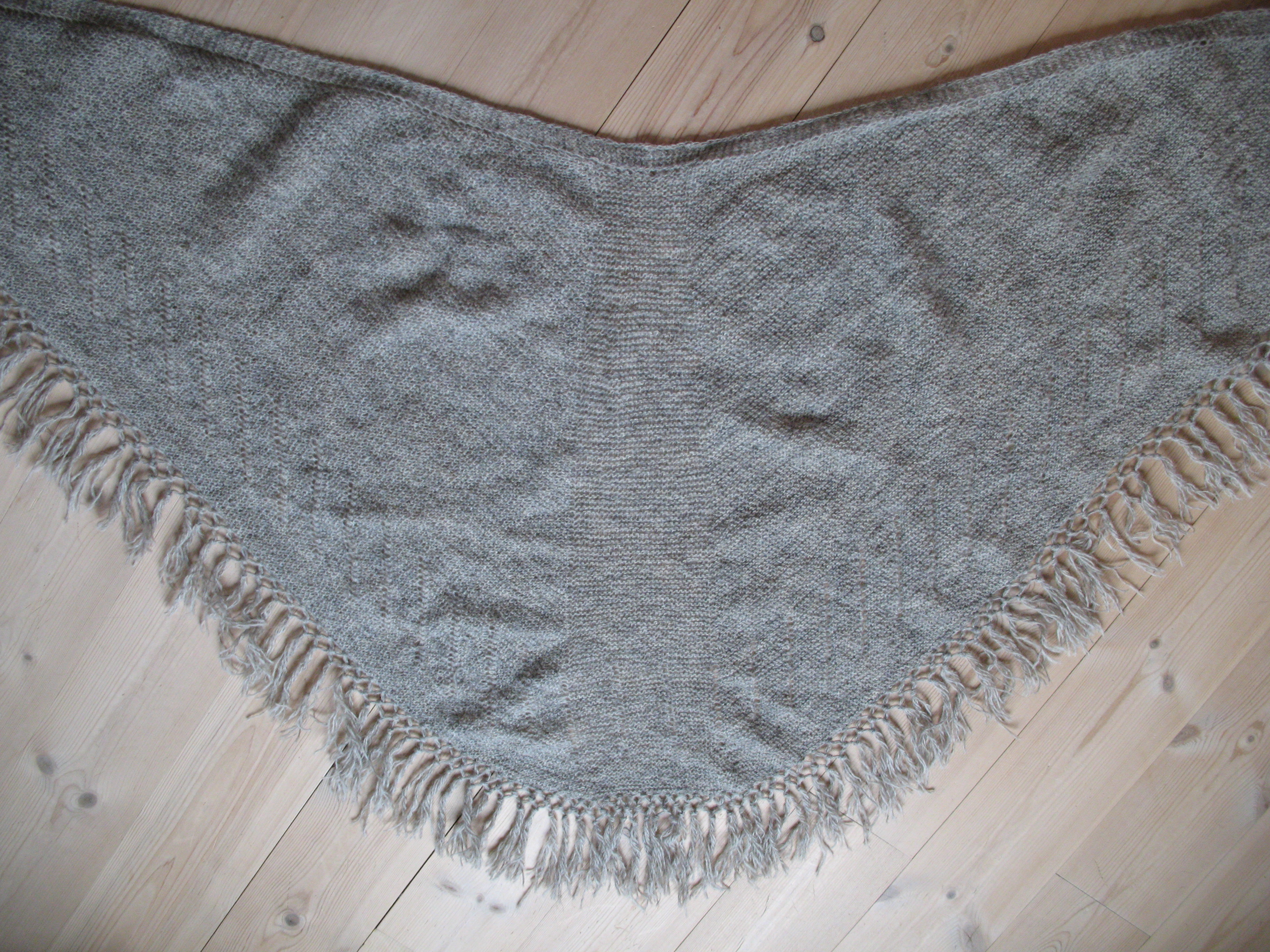
A Faroese shawl knit by Lisa Risager

A Faroese shawl is a traditional piece of clothing from the Faroe Islands. The most distinguishing characteristic of Faroese shawls is the center back gusset shaping. Each shawl consists of two triangular side panels, a trapezoid-shaped back gusset, an edge treatment, and usually shoulder shaping. The shoulder shaping allows these shawls to drape over the shoulders and remain in place as the wearer moves, even if the shawl is not pinned in place.

Instead of a more familiar triangular, rectangular or circular shape, Faroese shawls are shaped like butterfly wings. Some have very long ends so they can be tied around the wearer's waist for extra warmth.

The shawls often feature elaborate lace work. Lace knitting is a traditional handcraft of peoples of the Faroe Islands.

These shawls are traditionally knit from domestic wool of native sheep grown primarily for meat. Natural colors of brown, black, grey and creamy white are most often used. Some shawls may have color features in place of lace, or combinations of color panels or stripes and lace panels.

The notation used for recording patterns for these shawls is unique. Patterns are drawn out showing the back gusset and one side panel with numerical shaping instructions noted on the diagram. Lace patterns are drawn showing where the eyelets go, but without specifying where the accompanying decreases should go.

Most shawls are begun at the neck, but Faroese shawls are begun from the bottom by casting on hundreds of stitches. As the work progresses, structural decreases between the side panels and back gusset reduce the number of stitches until very few remain at the neck. Since garter stitch is used, the shawls are reversible, except where color panels are used.
