= Lítla Dímun =

- Island
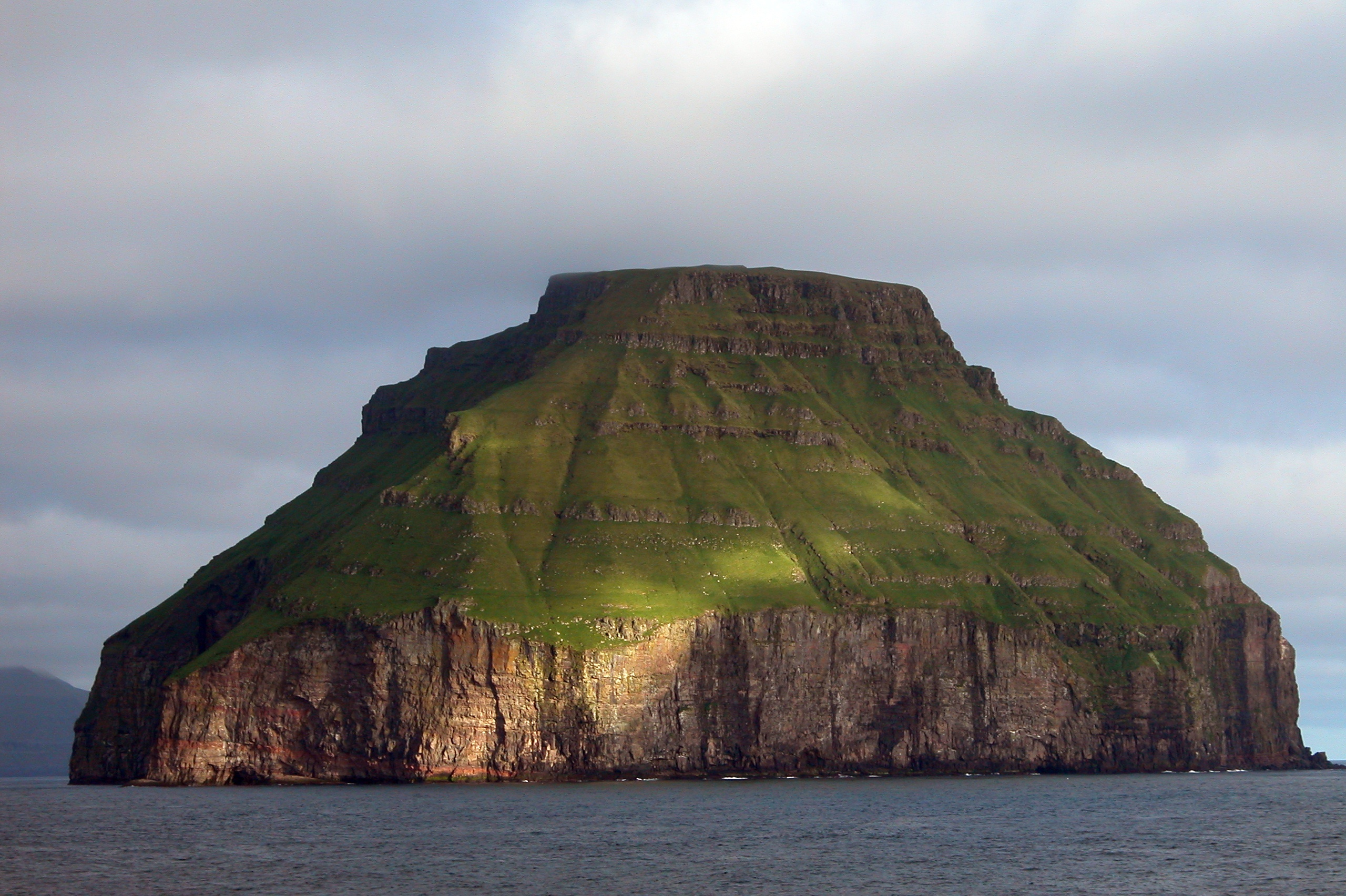
- Lítla Dímun

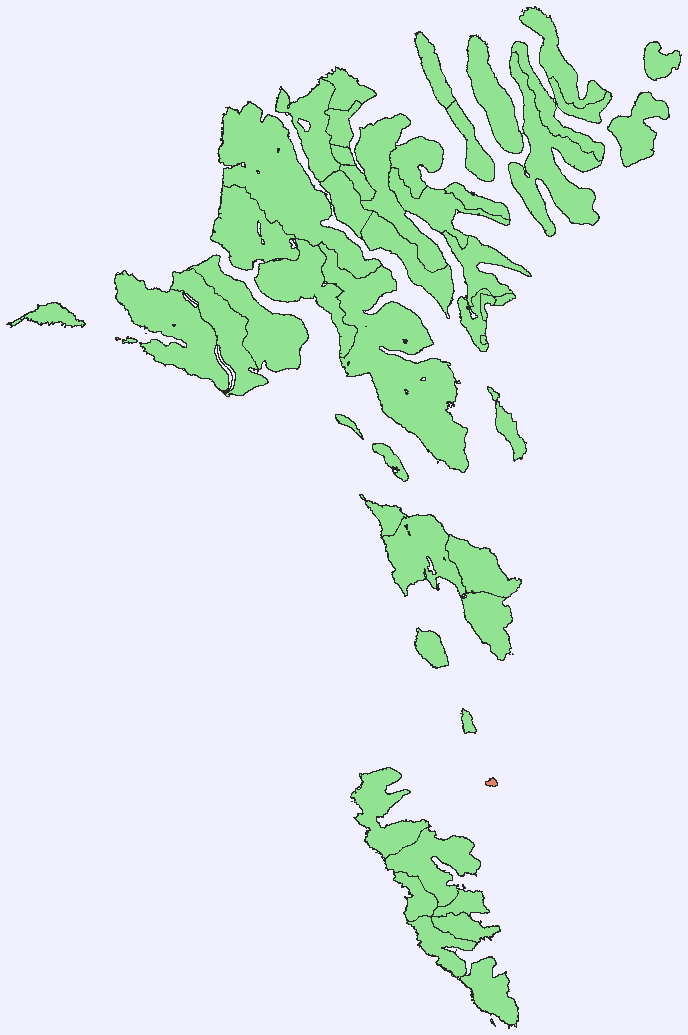
- Location within the Faroe Islands
- Coordinates: 61°38′N 6°42′W
- State: Kingdom of Denmark
- Constituent country: Faroe Islands

Area
  - Total: 0.82 km^{2} (0.32 sq mi)
- Highest elevation: 414 m (1,358 ft)

Population
  - Total: 0
- Time zone: UTC+0 (GMT)
  - Summer (DST): UTC+1 (EST)
- Calling code: 298

Lítla Dímun is a small, uninhabited island between the islands of Suðuroy and Stóra Dímun in the Faroe Islands. It is the smallest of the main 18 islands, being less than a square kilometre (247 acres) in area, and is the only uninhabited one. The island can be seen from the villages of Hvalba and Sandvík.

== Etymology ==
The name means "Little Dímun", in contrast to “Stóra Dímun”, "Great Dímun". According to Fridtjof Nansen, Dímun may represent a pre-Norse, Celtic toponymic element meaning "double-neck". Stóra and Litla Dímun shows a pairing of two distinctive but separate localities in one name. Gammeltoft concluded Dímun is a Scandinavian place name for a double-peaked feature of a particular appearance, reflecting a linguistic contact between Scandinavians and Gaels.

== Description ==
The lowest third of the island is sheer cliff, with the rest rising to the mountain of Slættirnir, which reaches 414 metres (1,358 ft). The island is inhabited only by Faroe sheep and seabirds. Getting ashore is difficult, and can be performed only in perfect weather. The cliffs can be climbed with the aid of ropes placed by the owners of the sheep.

=== Important Bird Area ===
The island has been identified as an Important Bird Area by BirdLife International because of its significance as a breeding site for seabirds, especially European storm petrels (5000 pairs) and Atlantic puffins (10,000 pairs).

There are no land animals beside sheep.

== History ==
The island has never been inhabited by humans, but sheep were kept there from ancient times, being mentioned in the 13th-century work the Færeyinga Saga (Saga of the Faroese). The saga also features the island as the site of a battle between Brestir, father of Sigmundur, and Gøtuskeggjar. The battle resulted in the death of Sigmund's father and his men and the deportation of Sigmund to Norway, where he befriended Olaf Tryggvasson, the King of Norway from 995 to 1000.

The island used to be property of the Danish King, but it was difficult to get anyone to settle the island as it is very steep and hard to land at, and it was thus decided to sell it; it was mostly men from Hvalba who had used and rented the island until then. The auction was held in Hvalba on 24 July 1852, and the final bid was 4,820 rigsdaler or 9,640 Dkk, quite a sum for the time. Men from Hvalba and Sandvík together outbid the factor for the royal sales-station in Tvøroyri, who kept pushing the price up.

The island was then given to the men from Hvalba and Sandvík as Copyhold inheritance, against 40 Dkk in copyhold rent, and 10 Dkk every time there was a new owner. This money was in 1911 released with 1,000 Dkk, and thus did Lítla Dímun become the only privately owned island in the Faroes.

=== Shipwreck ===
In 1918, the Danish schooner Caspe, carrying a cargo of salt, was driven onto Lítla Dímun by a gale. The six crew were able to reach a narrow ledge just above the surf, but they had no stores, and the captain was severely injured. Eventually, they managed to move from the ledge, and found a cabin halfway up the island which had matches, fuel and a lamp. They caught two sheep and a sick bird, and were able to survive for seventeen days before being discovered and rescued by a fishing boat. One of the shipwrecked sailors eventually settled in the Faroes.

== Sheep ==
The sheep now living on the island are Faroes sheep, but until the mid-nineteenth century it was occupied by a distinct breed of feral sheep, probably derived from the earliest sheep brought to Northern Europe in the Neolithic Period. The last of these very small, black, short-wooled sheep were shot to extinction in the 1860s. They were similar in appearance and origin to the surviving Soay sheep, from the island of Soay in the St Kilda archipelago off the west coast of Scotland. Soay is an island of very similar size and topography to Lítla Dímun, and has similarly difficult access.

The modern Faroes sheep of the island are gathered each autumn. People sail to the island in a fishing boat, towing several rowing skiffs. About 40 people then form a chain across the island, driving the 200 or so sheep into a pen on the north side of the island. The sheep are then caught, restrained by tying their feet together, put in nets five at a time and lowered by ropes to the skiffs. Each skiff then takes its load of 15 sheep to the fishing boat, which returns to the island of Suðuroy. The sheep are unloaded on the wharf in the village of Hvalba, where they are placed in rows and distributed to their owners. A few sheep escape the gathering, and from time to time these are shot.

== In popular culture ==
In Pierdomenico Baccalario's book trilogy Cyboria, New City, a futuristic utopic city, is located in this island and covered by clouds on top so as not to be seen from the air.

== Photos ==
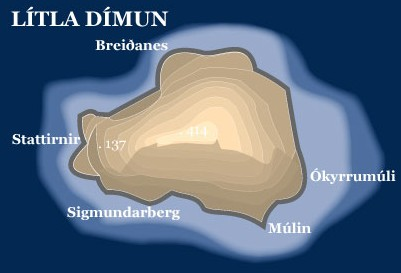
Map of Lítla Dímun.

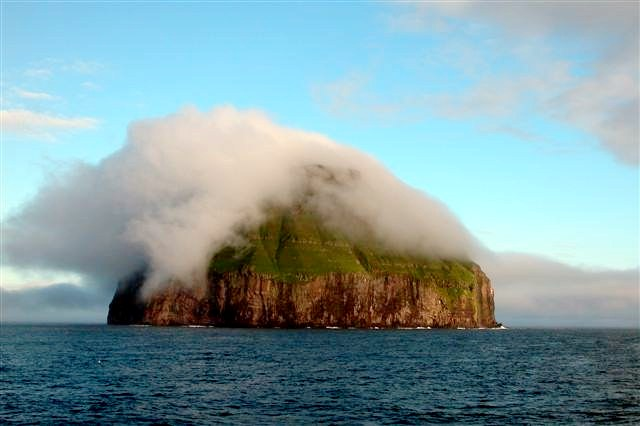
Clouds often cover the island.

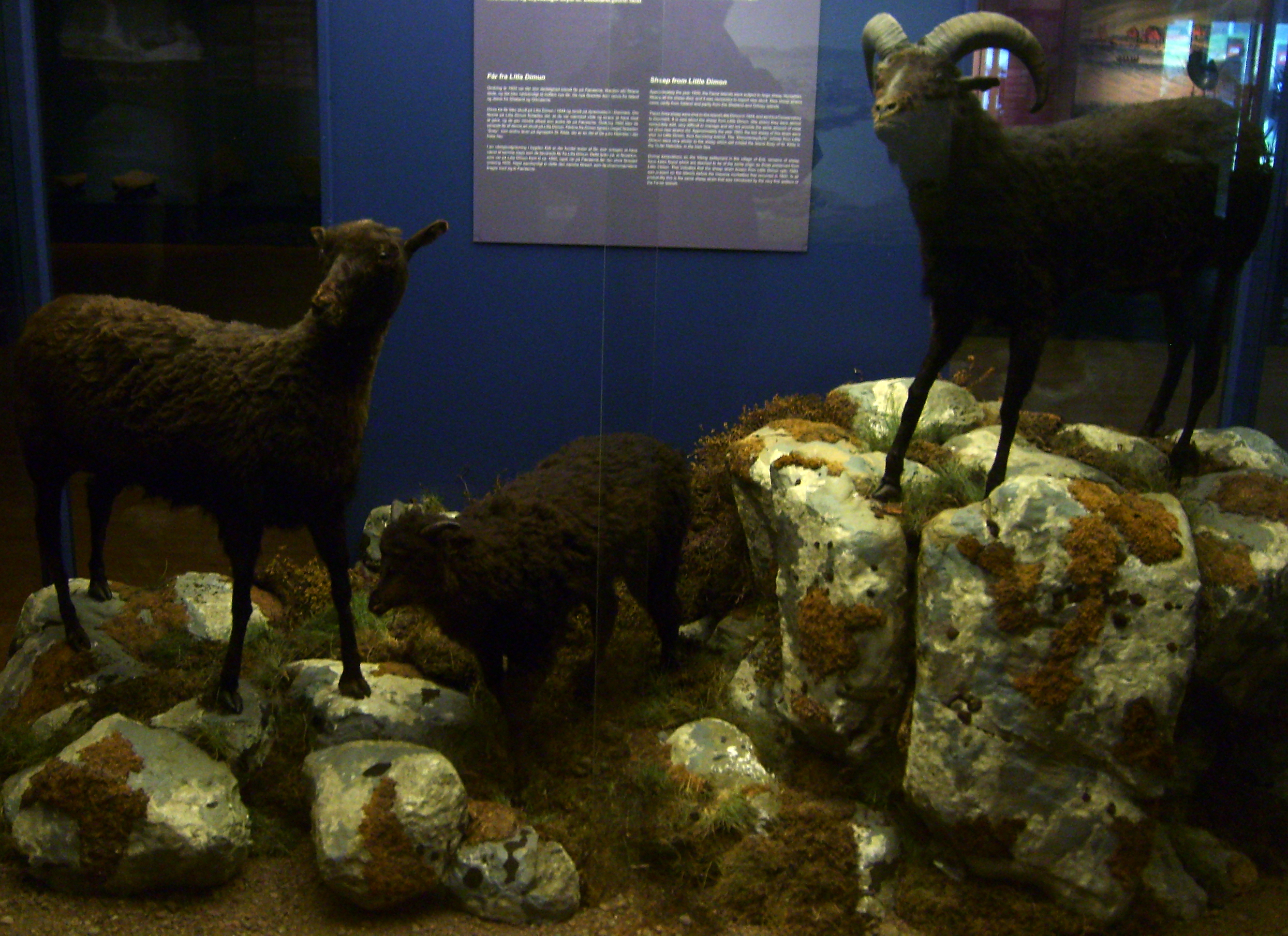
Museum specimens of the extinct feral sheep of Lítla Dímun.
