= Skilling (currency) =

The skilling (pronounced shilling in English) was the Scandinavian equivalent of the shilling. It was used as a subdivision of the various kinds of currencies named rigsdaler in use throughout Scandinavia, including the Danish rigsdaler, the Norwegian rigsdaler, and the Swedish riksdaler.

== Denmark ==
The skilling began to be minted in Denmark in the 1440s under Christopher of Bavaria. From 1625 to 1873, one Danish skilling (pronounced [ˈske̝lˀe̝ŋ]) was equivalent to 1/96 of a rigsdaler. King Christian IX abolished the rigsdaler and skilling in favor of the kroner and ører in 1873. The word is still used colloquially for a small but unspecified amount of money ("lille skilling").

== Norway ==
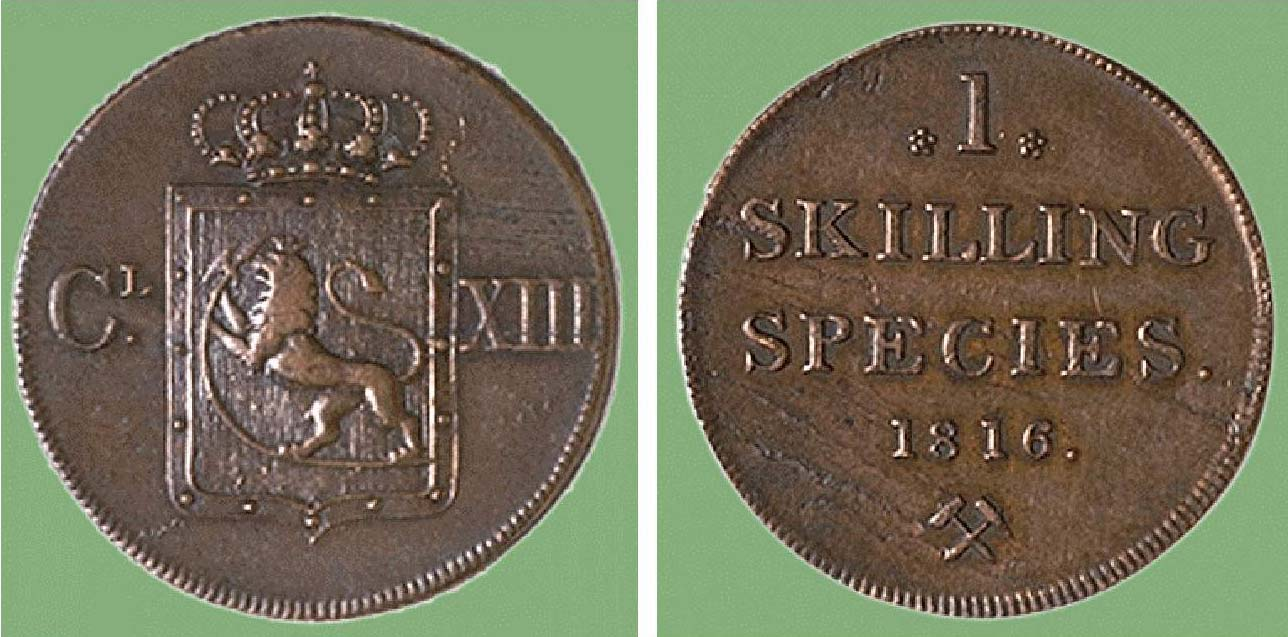
One Norwegian skilling, 1816

The skilling began to be minted in Norway in the 1510s. From 1816, the Norwegian skilling (pronounced [ˈʂɪ̂lːɪŋ]) was equivalent to 1/120 of a speciedaler, and before that 1/120 of a rigsdaler specie, or 1/96 of a rigsdaler courant. It was introduced in Norway in the early 16th century and was abolished 1875.

== Sweden ==
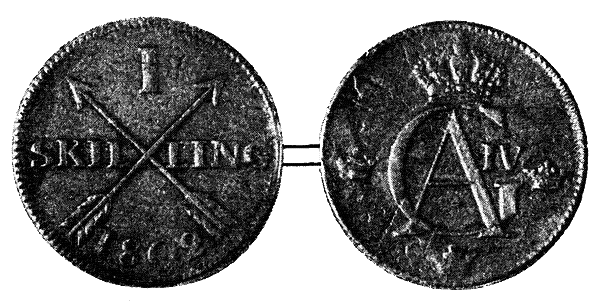
One Swedish skilling, 1802

During the 19th century, one Swedish skilling (pronounced [ˈɧɪ̂lːɪŋ]) was equivalent to 1/48 of a riksdaler. It was in use between 1776 and 1855.

== See also ==
- Austrian schilling
- Scandinavian Monetary Union
