= Lítla Dímun sheep =

Extinct sheep

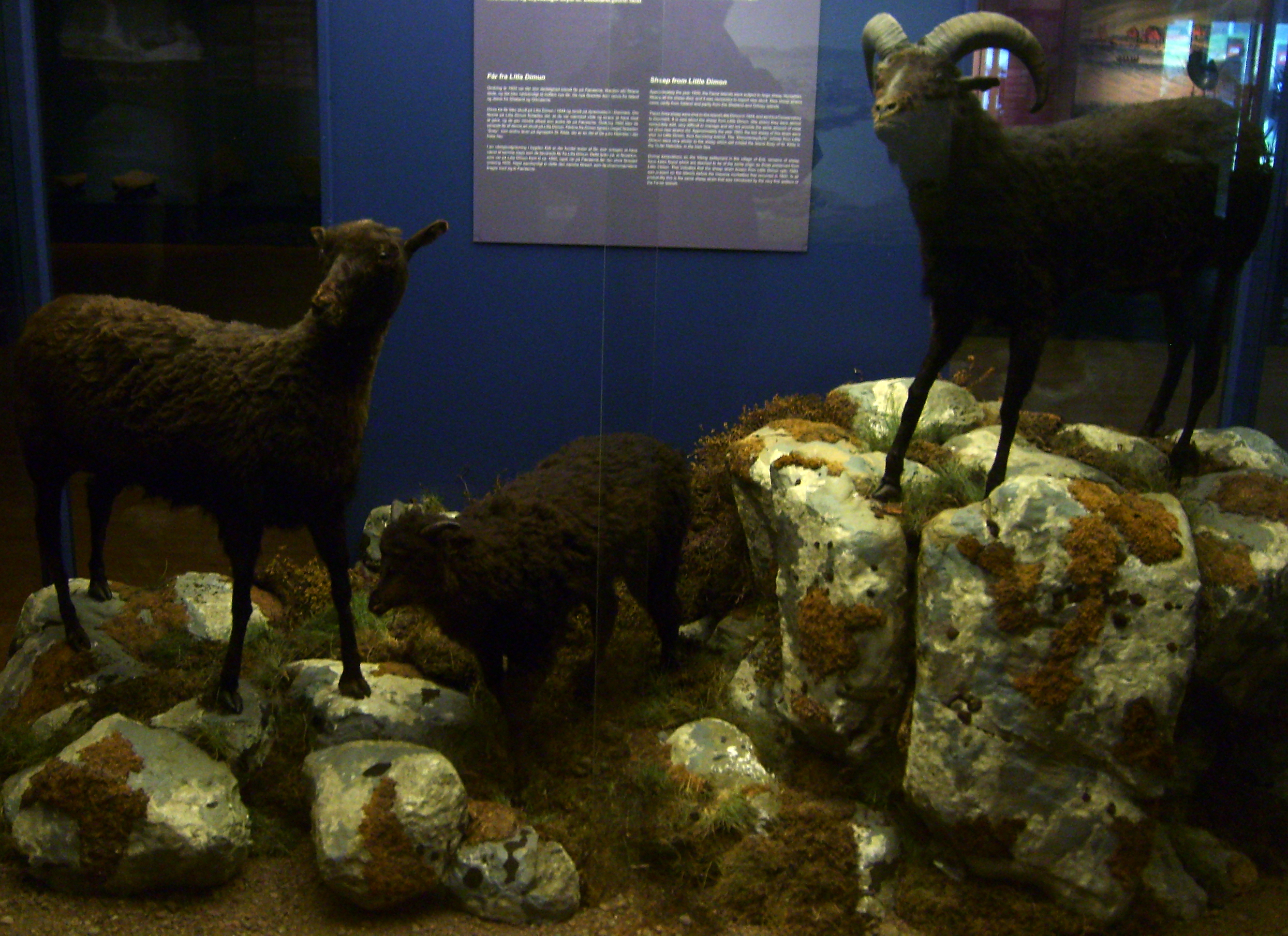
Museum specimens of the extinct feral sheep of Lítla Dímun.

The Lítla Dímun sheep (Dímunarseyðurin) was a type of short-tailed sheep endemic to Lítla Dímun in the Faroe Islands. It became extinct in the mid-19th century.

It was a feral sheep, probably derived from the earliest sheep brought to Northern Europe in the Neolithic Period. The last of these very small, black, short-wooled sheep were shot in the 1860s.

It was similar in appearance and origin to the surviving Soay sheep, from the island of Soay in the St Kilda archipelago off the west coast of Scotland. Soay is an island of very similar size and topography as Lítla Dímun, and has similarly difficult access.

The sheep now living on Lítla Dímun are Faroes sheep, a more domesticated short-tailed type.
