= Kenneth Macaulay =

Kenneth Macaulay may refer to:

- Kenneth Macaulay (colonialist) (1792–1829), colonial official in Sierra Leone
- Kenneth Macaulay (minister) (1723–1779), Scottish church minister and local historian
- Kenneth Macaulay (politician) (1815–1867), English politician
