= St Kilda, Scotland =

Archipelago in Outer Hebrides, Scotland, United Kingdom

St Kilda
Hiort (Gaelic)
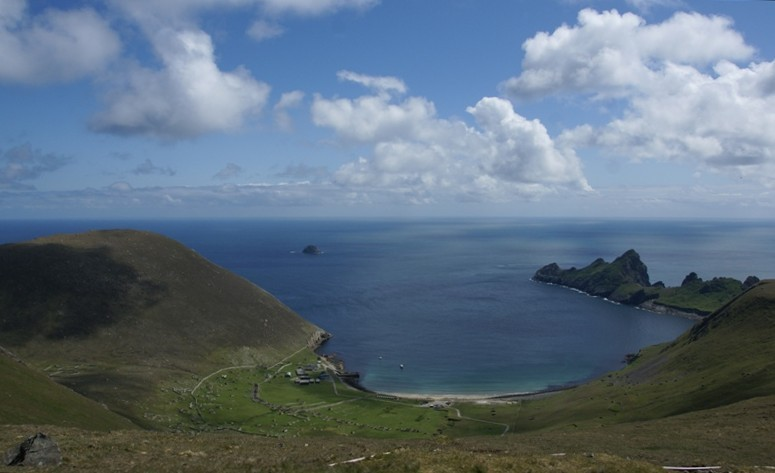
- Village Bay

Location
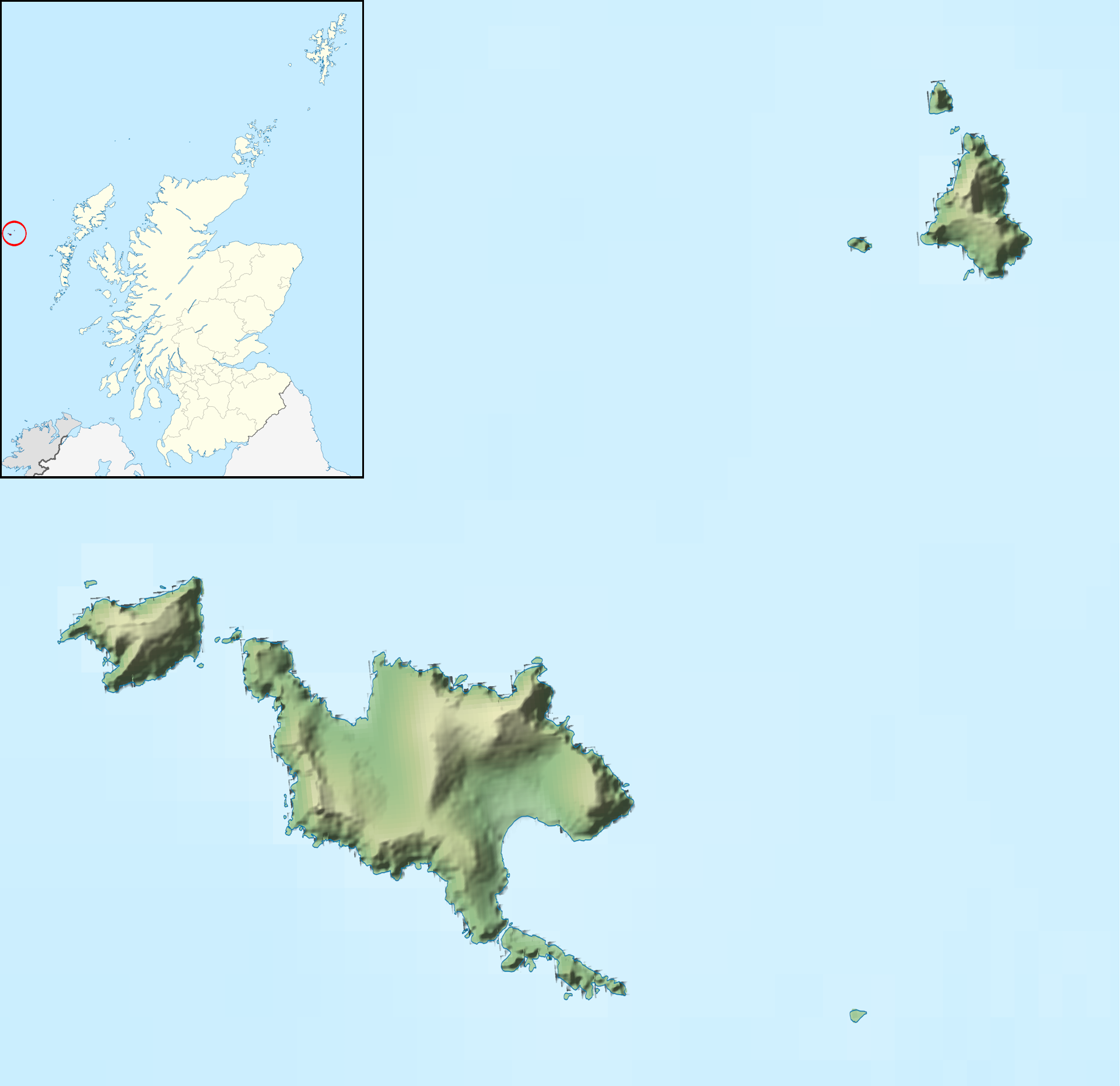
- Map of St Kilda St Kilda shown within the Outer Hebrides
- OS grid reference: NF095995
- Coordinates: 57°48′54″N 08°35′15″W

Name
- Gaelic pronunciation: [hirˠʃt̪]
- Name meaning: Unknown, possibly Gaelic for "westland" or Norse for "stags"
- Old Norse name: Possibly Hirtir

Physical geography
- Island group: St Kilda
- Area: 3 1/4 sq mi (8.5 km^{2})
- Highest elevation: Conachair, 430 m (1,410 ft)

Administration
- Council area: Comhairle nan Eilean Siar
- Country: Scotland
- Sovereign state: United Kingdom

Demographics
- Population: No permanent population since 1930
- Largest settlement: Am Baile (the Village)

UNESCO World Heritage Site
- Criteria: Cultural: iii, v; Natural: vii, ix, x
- Reference: 387
- Inscription: 1986 (10th Session)
- Extensions: 2004, 2005
- Area: 24,201.4 hectares (59,803 acres)

St Kilda (Scottish Gaelic: Hiort) is a remote archipelago situated 35 nautical miles (65 kilometres) west-northwest of North Uist in the North Atlantic Ocean. It contains the westernmost islands of the Outer Hebrides of Scotland. (Note: Excluding the isolated pinnacle Rockall, the status of which is a matter of international dispute. See, for example, MacDonald, Fraser (1 August 2007). "The last outpost of Empire: Rockall and the Cold War". Journal of Historical Geography. 32 (3): 627–647. doi:10.1016/j.jhg.2005.10.009.) The largest island is Hirta, whose sea cliffs are the highest in the United Kingdom; three other islands (Dùn, Soay and Boreray) were also used for grazing and seabird hunting. The islands are administratively a part of the Comhairle nan Eilean Siar local authority area.

The origin of the name St Kilda is a matter of conjecture. The islands' human heritage includes unique architectural features from the historic and prehistoric periods, although the earliest written records of island life date from the Late Middle Ages. The medieval village on Hirta was rebuilt in the 19th century, but illnesses brought by increased external contacts through tourism, and the upheaval of the First World War, contributed to the island's evacuation. Permanent habitation on the islands possibly extends back two millennia, the population probably never exceeding 180; its peak was in the late 17th century. The population waxed and waned, eventually dropping to 36 in 1930, when the remaining population was evacuated. Currently, the only year-round residents are military personnel; a variety of conservation workers, volunteers and scientists spend time there in the summer months. The entire archipelago is owned by the National Trust for Scotland.

A cleit is a stone storage hut or bothy unique to St Kilda; there are known to be 1,260 cleitean on Hirta and a further 170 on the other group islands. Two different early sheep types have survived on these remote islands: the Soay, a Neolithic type, and the Boreray, an Iron Age type. The islands are a breeding ground for many important seabird species including northern gannets, Atlantic puffins, and northern fulmars. The St Kilda wren and St Kilda field mouse are endemic subspecies.

It became one of Scotland's seven World Heritage Sites in 1986, and is one of the few in the world to hold joint status for both its natural and cultural qualities.

== Origin of names ==
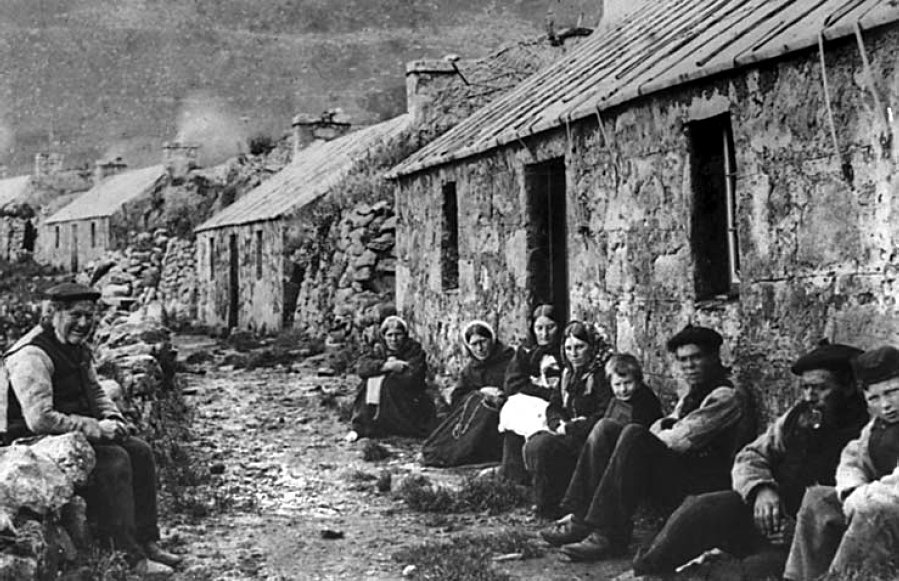
The Street in 1886

The name St Kilda, which is not used in Gaelic, is of obscure origin, as there is no saint by the name Kilda. It occurs for the first time in Thresoor der Zeevaert ("Treasure of Navigation"), a pilot book published by Lucas Waghenaer in 1592. A. B. Taylor suggests that it originated as a copying error for Skilda(r), a name that appears on Nicolas de Nicolay's 1583 map of Scotland, which Waghenaer used as a source. On Nicolay's map, (Note: And on two other 16th-century maps, all three of which may derive from a 1540 original by Alexander Lindsay, a Scottish pilot.) the name denotes an island group closer to Lewis and Harris than St Kilda, possibly Haskeir, Gasker or Haskeir Eagach. Taylor notes that the latter two groups could be compared to shields lying flat upon the water, and gives the Norse word skildir (meaning "shields") as the etymon.

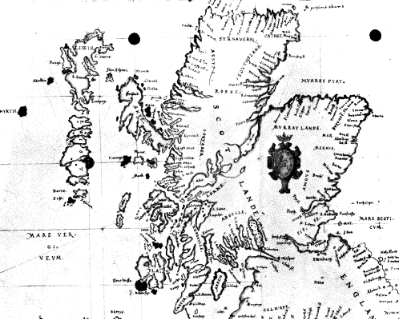
1580 Carte of Scotlande showing Hyrth (i.e. Hirta) at left and Skaldar to the north east

According to another theory, advanced by William J. Watson and others, the name derives from Tobar Childa, an important well on Hirta. Childa is in fact a descendant of kelda, the Norse word for a well, but it is possible that visitors to the island (who would have used the well to take on fresh water) mistook it as the name of a local saint. A number of other theories have been suggested in both the past and in modern times. (Note: Martin Martin, who visited in 1697, believed that the name "is taken from one Kilder, who lived here; and from him the large well Toubir-Kilda has also its name". Maclean (1972) similarly suggests it comes from a corruption of the Old Norse name for the spring on Hirta, Childa, and states that a 1588 map identifies the archipelago as Kilda. He also speculates that it refers to the Culdees, anchorites who might have brought Christianity to the island, or be a corruption of the Gaelic name, Hirta, for the main island of the group, since the islanders tended to pronounce r as l, and thus habitually referred to the island as Hilta. Steel (1988) adds weight to the idea, noting that the islanders pronounced the H with a "somewhat guttural quality", making the sound they used for Hirta "almost" Kilta. Similarly, St Kilda speakers interviewed by the School of Scottish Studies in the 1960s show individual speakers using t-initial forms, leniting to /h/, e.g. ann an Tirte ([ˈan̪ˠən̪ˠ ˈtʰʲirˠʃt̪ʲə]) and gu Hirte ([kə ˈhirˠʃt̪ʲə]).)

Pronunciation
- Scottish Gaelic: Am Baile
- Pronunciation: [əm ˈpalə]
- Scottish Gaelic: An Lag bhon Tuath
- Pronunciation: [ə ˈlˠ̪ak vɔn̪ˠ ˈt̪ʰuə]
- Scottish Gaelic: Bàgh a' Bhaile
- Pronunciation: [ˈpaːɣ ə valə]
- Scottish Gaelic: cleitean
- Pronunciation: [ˈkʰlehtʲan]
- Scottish Gaelic: Cleitean MacPhàidein
- Pronunciation: [ˈkʰlehtʲan maxkˈfaːtʲɛɲ]
- Scottish Gaelic: Cnatan nan Gall
- Pronunciation: [ˈkʰɾãht̪an nəŋ ˈkaulˠ̪]
- Scottish Gaelic: Conachair
- Pronunciation: [ˈkʰɔnəxəɾʲ]
- Scottish Gaelic: Dòirneagan Hiort
- Pronunciation: [ˈt̪ɔːrˠɲakən ˈhirˠʃt̪]
- Scottish Gaelic: Dùn
- Pronunciation: [ˈt̪uːn]
- Scottish Gaelic: Gleann Mòr
- Pronunciation: [ˈklaun̪ˠ ˈmoːɾ]
- Scottish Gaelic: Ì Àrd
- Pronunciation: [ˈiː ˈaːrˠt̪]
- Scottish Gaelic: Loch Hiort
- Pronunciation: [lˠ̪ɔxˈhirˠʃt̪]
- Scottish Gaelic: Mullach Bìgh
- Pronunciation: [ˈmulˠ̪əx ˈpiː]
- Scottish Gaelic: Mullach Mòr
- Pronunciation: [ˈmulˠ̪əx ˈmoːɾ]
- Scottish Gaelic: Oiseabhal
- Pronunciation: [ˈɔʃəvəlˠ̪]
- Scottish Gaelic: Ruadhbhal
- Pronunciation: [ˈrˠuəvəlˠ̪]
- Scottish Gaelic: Seann Taigh
- Pronunciation: [ˈʃaun̪ˠ ˈt̪ʰɤj]
- Scottish Gaelic: Taigh an t-Sithiche
- Pronunciation: [ˈt̪ʰɤj əɲ ˈtʰʲi.ɪçə]
- Scottish Gaelic: Taigh Dugain
- Pronunciation: [t̪ʰɤjˈt̪ukɛɲ]
- Scottish Gaelic: Taigh na Banaghaisgich
- Pronunciation: [ˈt̪ʰɤj nə ˈpanaɣaʃkʲɪç]
- Scottish Gaelic: Taigh Stallair
- Pronunciation: [ˈt̪ʰɤj ˈs̪t̪alˠ̪əɾʲ]

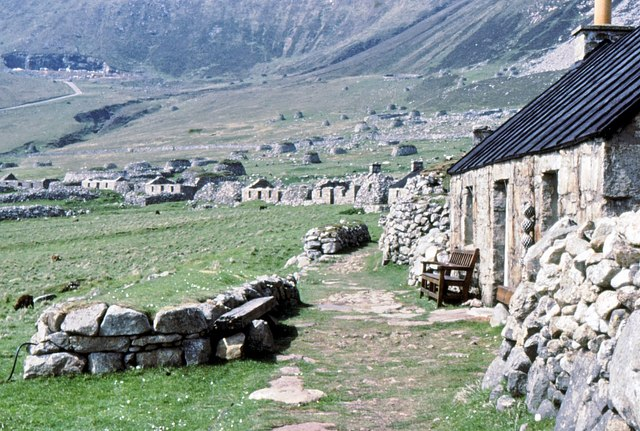
The Village Street showing restoration work

The origins of Hiort, and its anglicized form Hirta, which long pre-date St Kilda, are similarly obscure. Watson derives it from the Gaelic word (h)irt, meaning "death", noting that although Alexander MacBain suggested "that the ancient Celts fancied this sunset isle to be the gate to their earthly paradise" the connection was more likely to be to the dangers of living on St Kilda, which "in the Hebrides is regarded as a penitentiary rather than a gate to paradise". (Note: Watson notes that in the Uists the Gaelic for "in Hirta" is an t-Irt. However, Coates dismisses Watson's connection to (h)irt as "totally implausible".) It has also been said to mean "the western land", from the Gaelic (na) h-iartìre although this theory presents difficulties. It may not be Gaelic in origin at all, but rather Norse. Taylor derives it from the Norse word hirtir, meaning "stags", on account of the islands' "jagged outlines". In support of this theory, he notes that Hirtir appears in the 13th-century Prestssaga Guðmundar Arasonar as a name for an island group in the Hebrides.

As with St Kilda, a number of other theories have been offered. (Note: Martin (1703) averred that "Hirta is taken from the Irish Ier, which in that language signifies west". Steel (1998) quotes the view of Reverend Neil Mackenzie, who lived there from 1829 to 1844, that the name is from the Gaelic Ì Àrd ('high island'), and a further possibility that it is from the Norse Hirt ('shepherd'). In a similar vein, Murray (1966) speculates that the Norse Hirðö, pronounced 'Hirtha' ('herd island'), could be the origin of the name.) All the names of and on the islands are discussed by Richard Coates.

== Geography ==
The St Kilda archipelago

The islands are composed of Tertiary igneous formations of granites and gabbro, heavily weathered by the elements. The archipelago represents the remnants of a long-extinct ring volcano rising from a seabed plateau approximately 40 metres (130 ft) below sea level.

At 670 hectares (1,700 acres) in extent, Hirta is the largest island in the group and comprises more than 78% of the land area of the archipelago. Next in size are Soay (English: "sheep island") at 99 hectares (240 acres) and Boreray ("the fortified isle"), which measures 86 hectares (210 acres). Soay is 500 metres (1/4 nautical mile) northwest of Hirta, Boreray six kilometres (3 nmi) northeast. Smaller islets and stacks in the group include Stac an Armin ("warrior's stack"), Stac Lee ("grey stack") and Stac Levenish ("stream" or "torrent"). The island of Dùn ('fort'), which protects Village Bay from the prevailing southwesterly winds, was at one time joined to Hirta by a natural arch. MacLean (1972) suggests that the arch was broken when struck by a galleon fleeing the defeat of the Spanish Armada, but other sources, such as Mitchell (1992) and Fleming (2005), suggest that the arch was simply swept away by one of the many fierce storms that batter the islands every winter.

The highest point in the archipelago, Conachair ("the beacon") at 430 metres (1,410 ft), is on Hirta, immediately north of the village. In the southeast is Oiseval ("east fell"), which reaches 290 metres (950 ft), and Mullach Mòr ("big hill summit") 361 metres (1,185 ft) is due west of Conachair. Ruival ("red fell") 137 metres (449 ft) and Mullach Bi ("pillar summit") 358 metres (1,175 ft) dominate the western cliffs. Boreray reaches 384 metres (1,260 ft) and Soay 378 metres (1,240 ft). The extraordinary Stac an Armin reaches 196 metres (643 ft), and Stac Lee, 172 metres (564 ft), making them the highest sea stacks in Britain.

In modern times, St Kilda's only settlement was at Village Bay (Scottish Gaelic: Bàgh a' Bhaile or Loch Hiort) on the east side of Hirta. Gleann Mòr on the north coast of Hirta and Boreray also contain the remains of earlier habitations. The sea approach to Hirta into Village Bay suggests a small settlement flanked by high rolling hills in a semicircle behind it. This is misleading. The whole north face of Conachair is a vertical cliff up to 427 metres (1,401 ft) high, falling sheer into the sea and constituting the highest sea cliff in the UK.

The archipelago is the site of many of the most spectacular sea cliffs in the British Isles. Baxter and Crumley (1988) suggest that St Kilda: "...is a mad, imperfect God's hoard of all unnecessary lavish landscape luxuries he ever devised in his madness. These he has scattered at random in Atlantic isolation 100 miles (160 km) from the corrupting influences of the mainland, 40 miles (64 km) west of the westmost Western Isles. He has kept for himself only the best pieces and woven around them a plot as evidence of his madness."

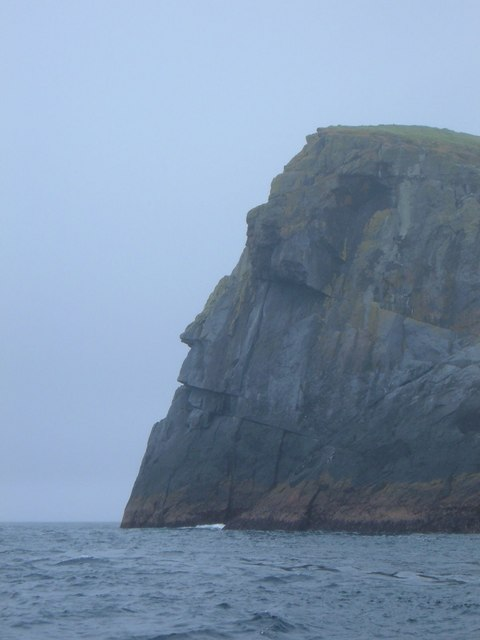
Cliff face silhouette on Stac Levenish

Although 64 kilometres (35 nmi) from the nearest land, St Kilda is visible from as far as the summit ridges of the Skye Cuillin, some 129 kilometres (70 nmi) distant. The climate is oceanic with high rainfall, 1,400 millimetres (55 in), and high humidity. Temperatures are generally cool, averaging 5.6 °C (42.1 °F) in January and 11.8 °C (53.2 °F) in July. The prevailing winds, especially strong in winter, are southerly and southwesterly. Wind speeds average 13 km/h (7.0 kn) approximately 85 percent of the time and more than 24 km/h (13 kn) more than 30 percent of the time. Gale-force winds occur less than two percent of the time, but gusts of 185 km/h (100 kn) and more occur regularly on the high tops, and speeds of 209 km/h (113 kn) have occasionally been recorded near sea level. The tidal range is 2.9 metres (9 1/2 ft), and ocean swells of 5 metres (16 ft) frequently occur, which can make landings difficult or impossible at any time of year. The oceanic location protects the islands from snow, which lies for only about a dozen days per year.

The archipelago's remote location and oceanic climate are matched in the UK only by a few smaller outlying islands such as the Flannan Isles, North Rona, Sula Sgeir, and the Bishop's Isles at the southern edge of the Outer Hebrides. Administratively, St Kilda was part of the parish of Harris in the traditional county of Inverness-shire. Today it is incorporated in the Comhairle nan Eilean Siar unitary authority (formerly Western Isles Islands Council).

== History ==
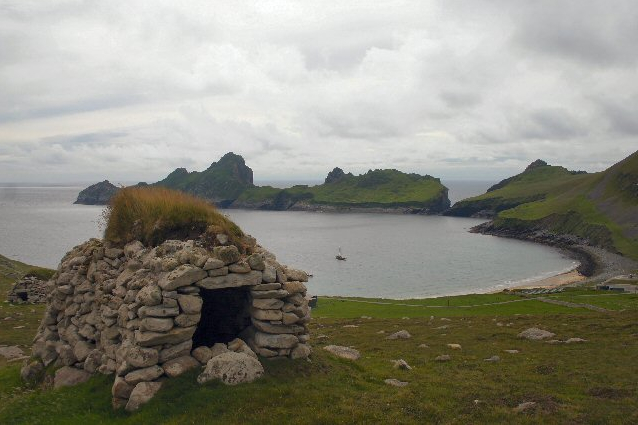
A cleit above Village Bay

=== Prehistory ===
It has been known for some time that St Kilda was continuously inhabited for two millennia or more, from the Bronze Age until 1930. In 2015, the first direct evidence of earlier Neolithic settlement emerged, sherds of pottery of the Hebridean ware style, found to the east of the village. The subsequent discovery of a quarry for stone tools on Mullach Sgar above Village Bay led to finds of numerous stone hoe-blades, grinders and Skaill knives (Note: A flaked stone with a sharp edge used for cutting. This neolithic tool is named after Skaill Bay, the location of World Heritage Site Skara Brae in Orkney.) in the Village Bay cleitean, unique stone storage buildings (see below). These tools are also probably of Neolithic origin.

The potsherds appear to have been made of local material, rather than material brought from other islands in the Hebrides, suggesting that the islands were settled in the 4th millennium BC. Iron Age pottery is also known. Archaeologist Alan Hunter Blair reported that "the eastern end of Village Bay on St Kilda was occupied fairly intensively during the Iron Age period, although no house structures were found".

=== 13th to 18th centuries ===
The first written record of St Kilda may date from 1202 when an Icelandic cleric wrote of taking shelter on "the islands that are called Hirtir". Early reports mentioned finds of brooches, an iron sword and Danish coins, and the enduring Norse place names indicate a sustained Viking presence on Hirta, but the visible evidence has been lost. In the late 14th century John of Fordun referred to it as "the isle of Irte (insula de Irte), which is agreed to be under the Circius and on the margins of the world". The islands were historically part of the domain of the MacLeods of Harris, whose steward was responsible for the collection of rents in kind and other duties. The first detailed report of a visit to the islands dates from 1549, when Donald Munro suggested that: "The inhabitants thereof ar simple poor people, scarce learnit in aney religion, but M'Cloyd of Herray, his stewart, or he quhom he deputs in sic office, sailes anes in the zear ther at midsummer, with some chaplaine to baptize bairnes ther." (Note: Monro (1549) "Hirta" No. 158. English translation from Lowland Scots: "The inhabitants are simple poor people, hardly educated in any religion, but the steward of MacLeod of Harris, or his deputy, sails there once a year at midsummer with a chaplain to baptise the children".)

Coll MacDonald of Colonsay raided Hirta in 1615, removing 30 sheep and a quantity of barley. Thereafter, the islands developed a reputation for abundance. At the time of Martin Martin's visit in 1697 the population was 180 and the steward travelled with a "company" of up to 60 persons to which he "elected the most 'meagre' among his friends in the neighbouring islands, to that number and took them periodically to St Kilda to enjoy the nourishing and plentiful, if primitive, fare of the island, and so be restored to their wonted health and strength."

According to Keay and Keay (1994), until the early 19th century the islanders' "close relationship with nature had taken the ritual form of Druidism", whilst their understanding of Christianity shaped their relationships with one another: a combination of "natural devoutness and superstitious character". Macauley (1764) claimed the existence of a "druidic" circle of stones fixed perpendicularly in the ground near the Stallar House on Boreray. However, by 1875 all trace of this had gone and according to John Sands “the St Kildans seem never to have heard of it”.

Rachel Chiesley, Lady Grange was held on St Kilda from 1734 to 1741. The church minister of Harris, Kenneth Macaulay, visited St Kilda in 1759 on behalf of the Society in Scotland for Propagating Christian Knowledge (SSPCK), and published in 1764 The History of St Kilda, containing a Description of this Remarkable Island, the Manners and Customs of its Inhabitants, the Religious and Pagan Antiquities there found, with many other curious and interesting particulars.

Visiting ships brought cholera and smallpox in the 18th century. In 1727, the loss of life was so high that too few residents remained to man the boats, and new families were brought in from Harris to replace them. (Note: This is the date provided by Quine (2000) for the marooning of the group on Stac an Armin, (see "Buildings on other islands" above), although Steel (1988) states that the outbreak took place in 1724.) By 1758 the population had risen to 88, and it had reached just under 100 by the end of the century. This figure remained fairly constant from the 18th century until 1852, when 36 islanders, with the help of the Highland and Island Emigration Society, emigrated to Australia on board the Priscilla; reducing the population to 70. Among the emigrants was Ewen Gillies. The laird of St Kilda, Sir John MacLeod, tried to persuade some of the group to return to the island; when they were unconvinced, he paid for their voyage to Australia. Eighteen of the 36 St Kildans died of sickness on the ship or in quarantine. The island never fully recovered from the population loss. The emigration was in part a response to the laird's closure of the church and manse for several years during the Disruption that created the Free Church of Scotland.

=== Religion ===
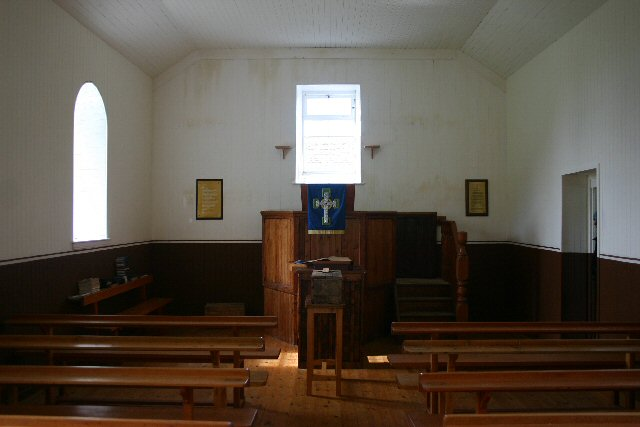
The interior of the church at Oiseabhal, St Kilda

A missionary called Alexander Buchan went to St Kilda in 1705, but despite his long stay, the idea of organised religion did not take hold. This changed when Rev. John MacDonald, the "Apostle of the North", arrived in 1822. He set about his mission with zeal, preaching 13 lengthy sermons during his first 11 days. He returned regularly and raised funds on behalf of the St Kildans, although privately he was appalled by their lack of religious knowledge. The islanders took to him with enthusiasm and wept when he left for the last time eight years later. His successor, who arrived on 3 July 1830, was Rev. Neil Mackenzie, a resident Church of Scotland minister who greatly improved the conditions of the inhabitants. He reorganised island agriculture, was instrumental in the rebuilding of the village (see below) and supervised the building of a new church and manse. With help from the Gaelic School Society, MacKenzie and his wife introduced formal education to Hirta, beginning a daily school to teach reading, writing and arithmetic and a Sunday school for religious education.

Mackenzie left in 1844. No new minister was appointed for a decade and as a result, the school closed on the MacKenzies' departure and although he had achieved a great deal, the weakness of the St Kildans' dependence on external authority was exposed in 1865 with the arrival of Rev. John Mackay. Despite their fondness for Mackenzie, who stayed in the Church of Scotland, the St Kildans declared in favour of the new Free Church of Scotland during the Great Disruption. Mackay, the new Free Church minister, placed an uncommon emphasis on religious observance. He introduced a routine of three two-to-three-hour services on Sunday at which attendance was effectively compulsory. One visitor noted in 1875 that: "The Sabbath was a day of intolerable gloom. At the clink of the bell, the whole flock hurry to Church with sorrowful looks and eyes bent upon the ground. It is considered sinful to look to the right or to the left."

Time spent in religious gatherings interfered seriously with the practical routines of the island. Old ladies and children who made noise in church were lectured at length and warned of dire punishments in the afterworld. During a period of food shortages on the island, a relief vessel arrived on a Saturday, but the minister said that the islanders had to spend the day preparing for church on the Sabbath, and it was Monday before supplies were landed. Children were forbidden to play games and required to carry a Bible wherever they went. Mackay remained minister on St Kilda for 24 years.

The church and manse have recently been restored and further restoration is planned for the 200th anniversary of the church. Visitors can see how they may have appeared in the 1920s.

=== Way of life ===
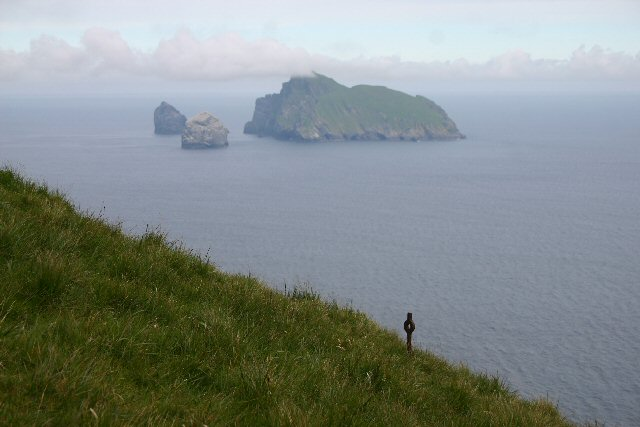
St Kildans paid some of their rent by collecting seabirds; roping pegs – one of which can be seen in this photo – enabled them to abseil down to the nests.

Most modern commentators feel that the predominant theme of life on St Kilda was isolation. When Martin Martin visited the islands in 1697, the only means of making the journey was by open boat, which could take several days and nights of rowing and sailing across the ocean and was next to impossible in autumn and winter. According to a St Kilda diarist writing in 1908, vicious storms could be expected at any time between September and March. More modern records from the National Trust for Scotland record gales for 75 days a year with peak winds around 144 mph (232 km/h) whilst peak wave heights on the Scottish west coast have been recorded at 16 m (52 ft).

In the mid-18th century, the St Kildans are recorded as speaking a "very corrupt dialect of the Galic adulterated with a little mixture of the Norvegian tongue."

Separated by distance and weather, the natives knew little of mainland and international politics. After the Battle of Culloden in 1746, it was rumoured that Prince Charles Edward Stuart and some of his senior Jacobite aides had escaped to St Kilda. An expedition was launched, and in due course British soldiers were ferried ashore to Hirta. They found a deserted village, as the St Kildans, fearing pirates, had fled to caves to the west. When the St Kildans were persuaded to come down, the soldiers discovered that the isolated natives knew nothing of the prince and had never heard of King George II either.

Even in the late 19th century, the islanders could communicate with the rest of the world only by lighting a bonfire on the summit of Conachair which would, weather permitting, be visible to those on the isles of Harris and the Uists, or by using the "St Kilda mailboat". This was the invention of John Sands, who visited in 1877. During his stay, a shipwreck left nine Austrian sailors marooned there, and by February supplies were running low. Sands attached a message to a lifebuoy salvaged from the Peti Dubrovacki and threw it into the sea. Nine days later it was picked up in Birsay, Orkney, and a rescue was arranged. The St Kildans, building on this idea, would fashion a piece of wood into the shape of a boat, attach it to a bladder made of sheepskin, and place in it a small bottle or tin containing a message. Launched when the wind came from the north-west, two-thirds of the messages were later found on the west coast of Scotland or in Norway.

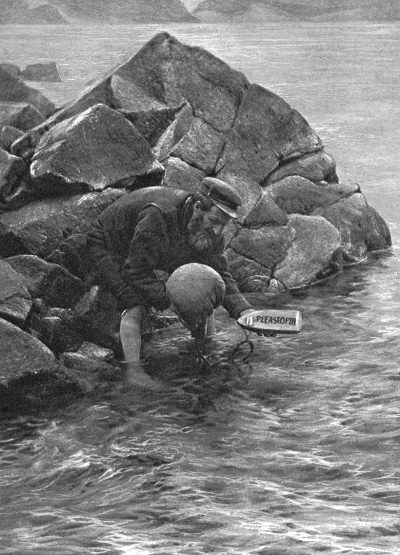
Launching the "St Kilda mailboat"

=== Diet ===
Another significant feature of St Kilda life was diet. The islanders kept sheep and some cattle, and were able to grow a limited amount of food crops, such as barley and potatoes, on the better-drained land in Village Bay; in many ways the islands can be seen as a large mixed farm. Samuel Johnson reported in the 18th century that sheep's milk was made "into small cheeses" by the St Kildans. They generally eschewed fishing because of the heavy, northern seas and unpredictable weather. The mainstay of their food supplies was the profusion of island birds, especially gannet and fulmar. These they harvested as eggs and young birds and ate both fresh and cured. Adult puffins were also caught using fowling rods. The method involved the use of a flexible pole with a noose on the end; a flick of the wrist would flip the noose over the puffin's head and it was killed before its struggles could alarm other birds. A 1764 census described a daily consumption by the 90 inhabitants of "36 wildfoul eggs and 18 wildfoul" (i.e. seabirds).

This feature of island life came at a price. When Henry Brougham visited in 1799 he noted that "the air is infected by a stench almost insupportable – a compound of rotten fish, filth of all sorts and stinking seafowl". An excavation of the Taigh an t-Sithiche (the "house of the faeries" – see below) in 1877 by Sands unearthed the remains of gannet, sheep, cattle, and limpets amidst various stone tools. The building is between 1,700 and 2,500 years old, which suggests that the St Kildan diet had changed little over the millennia. Indeed, the tools were recognised by the St Kildans, who could put names to them as similar devices were still in use.

Razorbill, guillemot, and fulmar eggs were collected before the late 1920s in St Kilda's islands by their men scaling the cliffs. The eggs were buried in St Kilda peat ash to be eaten through the cold, northern winters. The eggs were considered to be similar to duck eggs in taste and nourishment.

These fowling activities involved considerable skills in climbing, especially on the precipitous sea stacks. An important island tradition involved the "Mistress Stone", a door-shaped opening in the rocks northwest of Ruival over-hanging a gully. Young men of the island had to undertake a ritual there to prove themselves on the crags and worthy of taking a wife. Martin Martin wrote:

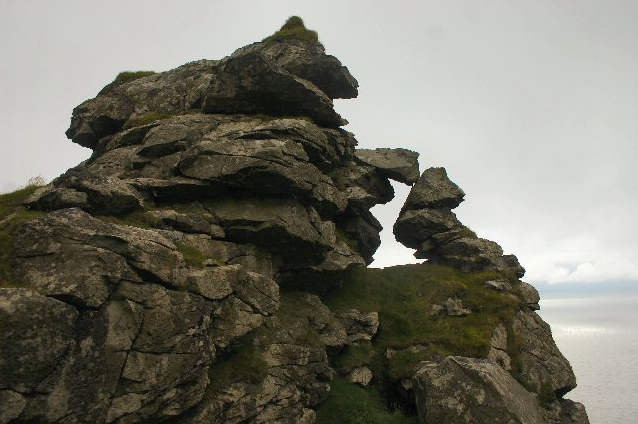
The Mistress Stone

In the face of the rock, south from the town, is the famous stone, known by the name of the mistress-stone; it resembles a door exactly; and is in the very front of this rock, which is 20 or 30 fathom [120 to 180 feet (37 to 55 m)] perpendicular in height, the figure of it being discernible about the distance of a mile; upon the lintel of this door, every bachelor-wooer is by ancient custom obliged in honour to give a specimen of his affection for the love of his mistress, and it is thus; he is to stand on his left foot, having the one half of his sole over the rock, and then he draws the right foot further out to the left, and in this posture bowing, he puts both his fists further out to the right foot; and then after he has performed this, he has acquired no small reputation, being always after it accounted worthy of the finest mistress in the world: they firmly believe that this achievement is always followed with the desired success. This being the custom of the place, one of the inhabitants very gravely desired me to let him know the time limited by me for trying of this piece of gallantry before I design'd to leave the place, that he might attend me; I told him this performance would have a quite contrary effect upon me, by robbing me both of my life and mistress at the same moment.

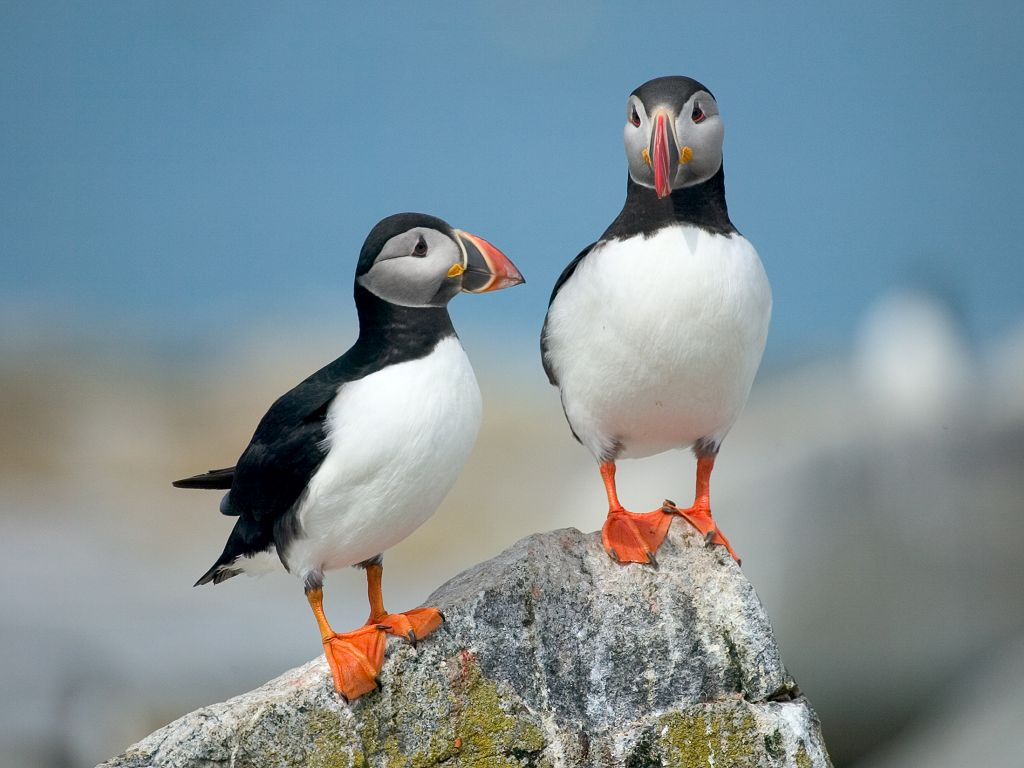
Atlantic puffin (Fratercula arctica). Seabirds were the mainstay of the St Kildan diet.

Another important aspect of St Kildan life was the daily "parliament". This was a meeting held in the street every morning after prayers and attended by all the adult males during the course of which they would decide upon the day's activities. No one led the meeting, and all men had the right to speak. According to Steel (1988), "Discussion frequently spread discord, but never in recorded history were feuds so bitter as to bring about a permanent division in the community". This notion of a free society influenced Enric Miralles' vision for the new Scottish Parliament Building, opened in October 2004.

Whatever the privations, the St Kildans were fortunate in some respects, for their isolation spared them some of the evils of life elsewhere. Martin noted in 1697 that the citizens seemed "happier than the generality of mankind as being almost the only people in the world who feel the sweetness of true liberty", and in the 19th century their health and well being was contrasted favourably with conditions elsewhere in the Hebrides. Theirs was not a utopian society; the islanders had ingenious wooden locks for their property, and financial penalties were exacted for misdemeanours. Nonetheless, no resident St Kildan is known to have fought in a war, and in four centuries of history, no serious crime committed by an islander was recorded there. (Note: A 19th-century commentator wrote: "If St Kilda is not the Eutopia so long sought, where will it be found? Where is the land which has neither arms, money, care, physic, politics, nor taxes? That land is St Kilda". Maclean, Lachlan (1838) Sketches on the Island of St Kilda. McPhun.)

=== Tourism in the 19th century ===
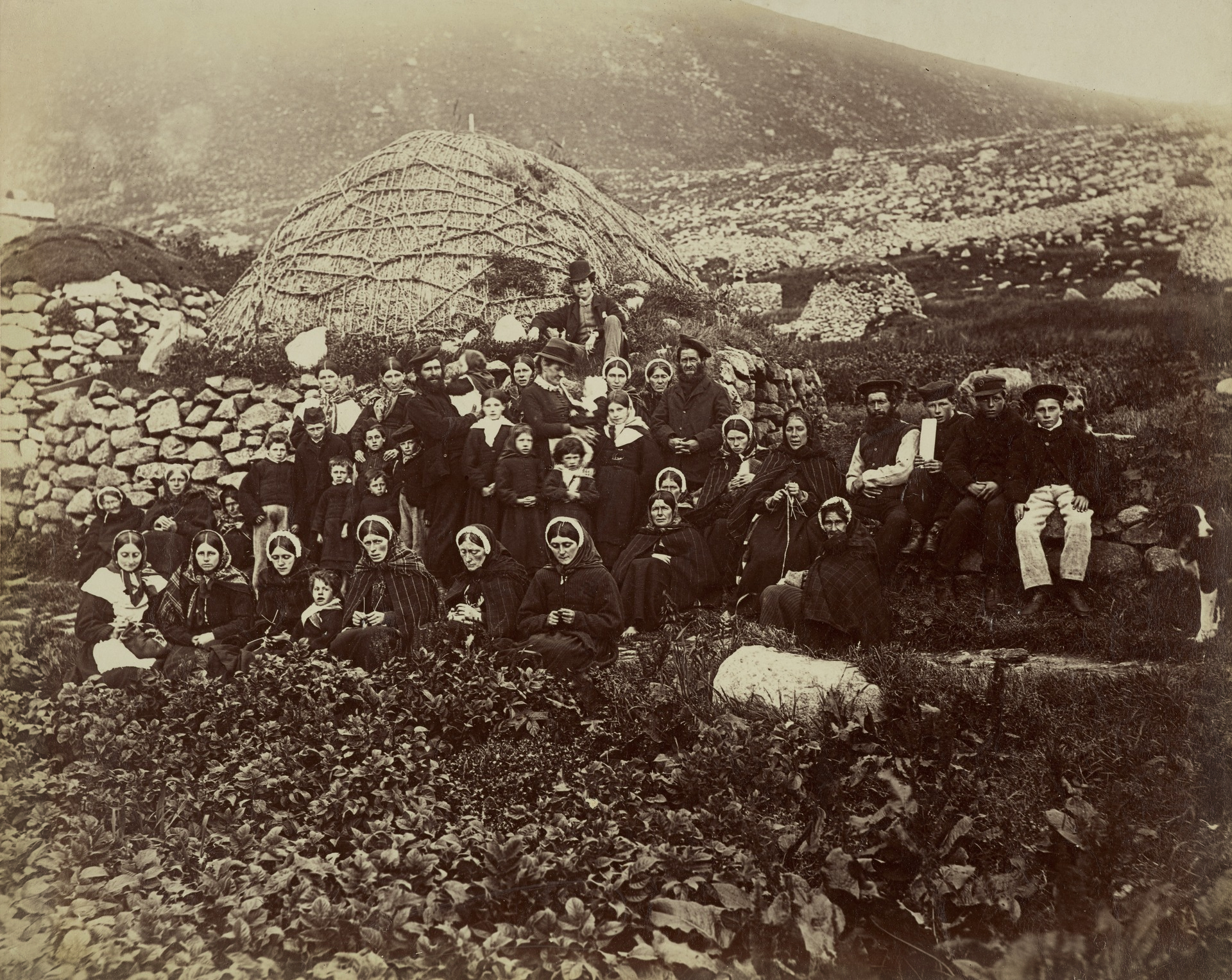
Photograph of the residents by an Edinburgh-based amateur photographer, circa 1890

Norman Heathcote visited the islands in 1898 and 1899 and wrote a book about his experiences. During the 19th century, steamers had begun to visit Hirta, enabling the islanders to earn money from the sale of tweeds and birds' eggs but at the expense of their self-esteem as the tourists regarded them as curiosities. It is also clear that the St Kildans were not so naïve as they sometimes appeared. "For example, when they boarded a yacht they would pretend they thought all the polished brass was gold, and that the owner must be enormously wealthy". The boats brought other previously unknown diseases, especially tetanus infantum, which resulted in infant mortality rates as high as 80 per cent during the late 19th century. The cnatan nan gall (lit. 'flu of the foreigners') or boat-cough, an illness that struck after the arrival of a ship off Hirta, became a regular feature of life.

By the early 20th century, formal schooling had again become a feature of the islands, and in 1906 the church was extended to make a schoolhouse. The children all now learned English and their native Gaelic. From the 1880s, trawlers fishing the north Atlantic made regular visits, bringing additional trade. There was talk of an evacuation in 1875 during MacKay's time as minister, but despite occasional food shortages and a flu epidemic in 1913, the population was stable at between 75 and 80, and there was no obvious sign that within a few years the millennia-old occupation of the island was to end.

=== District nurses of St Kilda ===
The islanders on St Kilda faced a number of health challenges over the years including susceptibility to the effects of influenza-like illnesses (the 'boat-cold'), smallpox, typhus, mumps and whooping cough. Neonatal tetanus led to high neonatal mortality with some expectant mothers travelling to Harris rather than rely on the skills of the island's untrained midwife. In the 21 years prior to 1876 there were 56 live births of whom only 15 survived, with the deaths thought to be due to neonatal tetanus. St Kilda never had a resident doctor but did have a number of resident nurses, although recruiting a district nurse was often seen as a priority for outsiders rather than islanders.

In the late 1800s Miss McAulay was a nurse on St Kilda for 9 years and Mrs Urquhart was a nurse on St Kilda for 1 year. Nurse Macleod left in 1890 citing the challenges of working with islanders. Attempts were made to interest an islander to go to the mainland and undergo nursing and midwifery training but no one wished to do this. In 1890 the minister, Rev Angus Fiddes, contacted the Glasgow Sick Poor and Private Nursing Association requesting a nurse for St Kilda. Nurse Chisnall arrived on St Kilda in 1890 and spent less than a year there. Chisnall was the last nurse to work there before a more than 20-year gap. During the absence of a district nurse, Fiddes did some training with a doctor in Glasgow and took on some of the nurse midwife role. The minister was provided with drugs and dressings by the island's proprietor.

After the Highlands and Islands Medical Service was instigated in 1913, there was a cursory annual visit to the island by a doctor from the Department of Health for Scotland. By 1914 district nurses were stationed on St Kilda. The first nurse supported by the Highlands and Islands Medical Service was Miss Margaret E. McLennan, a Queen's nurse. She trained in general nursing at Dumfries and Galloway Infirmary and midwifery at the Maternity Hospital Glasgow. She also worked in Stornoway on the Isle of Lewis. From the time of McLennan there was a nurse posted to St Kilda on a biennial contract until the island was evacuated in 1930, largely at the instigation of the nurse, Williamina Barclay. Barclay was a nurse on St Kilda for 3 years. Nurse Aitchison started her position there in 1914. In 1919 Nurse McKenzie was the district nurse on St Kilda for a population of 78 islanders. Like all the district nurses, during the winter months there was no further medical support. The district nurse on St Kilda in 1926 was Katherine Littlejohn.

=== First World War ===
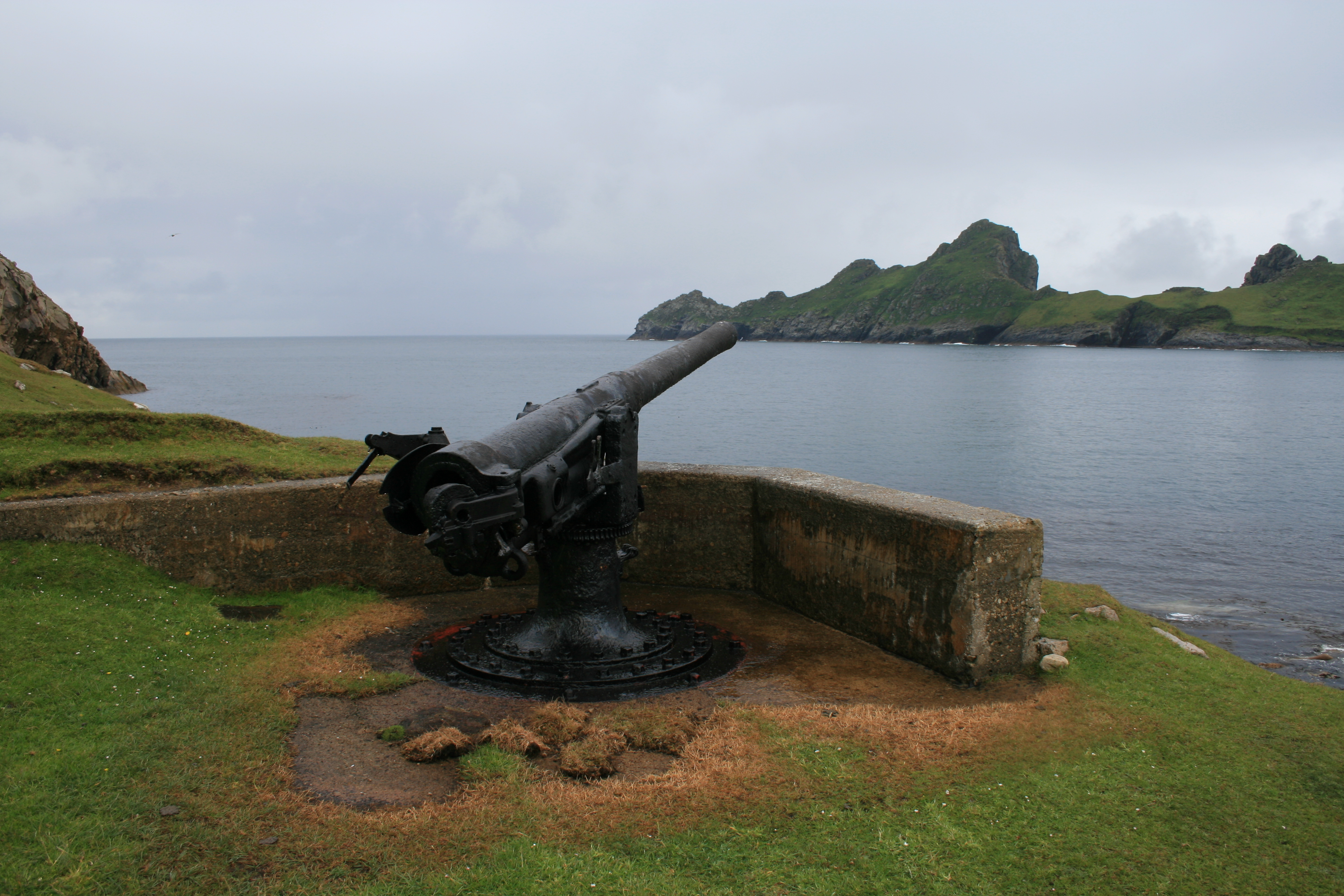
The 4-inch QF gun on Hirta looking towards Dùn.

Early in the First World War, the Royal Navy erected a signal station on Hirta, and daily communications with the mainland were established for the first time. On the morning of 15 May 1918, the German submarine SM U-90 arrived in Village Bay and, after issuing a warning, started shelling the island. Seventy-two shells were fired and the wireless station was destroyed. The manse, church, and jetty storehouse were damaged, but there was no loss of life. One eyewitness recalled: "It wasn't what you would call a bad submarine because it could have blowed every house down because they were all in a row there. He only wanted Admiralty property. One lamb was killed... all the cattle ran from one side of the island to the other when they heard the shots."

As a result of this attack, a 4-inch Mark III QF gun was erected on a promontory overlooking Village Bay, but it never saw action. Of greater significance to the islanders was the introduction of regular contact with the outside world and the development of a money-based economy. This made life easier for the St Kildans but also made them less self-reliant. Both were factors in the evacuation of the island little more than a decade later.

"Ironically, things improved with the war, which brought a naval detachment and regular deliveries of mail and food from naval supply vessels but when these services were withdrawn at end of the war, the sense of isolation increased. Able bodied young islanders left for a better life, resulting in a breakdown of the island economy".

=== Evacuation and aftermath ===
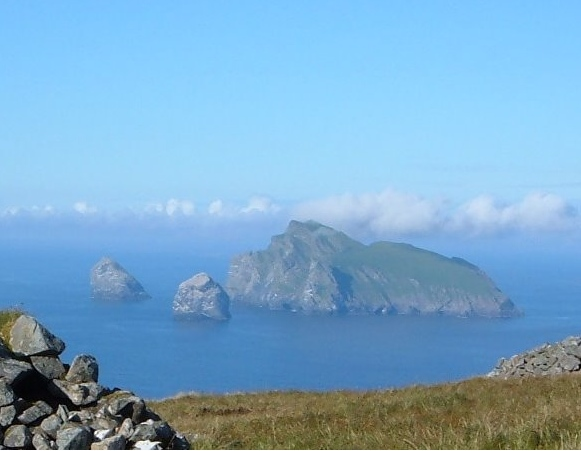
Boreray, Stac Lee, and Stac an Armin (left) from the heights of Conachair, the highest cliff in the United Kingdom.

Numerous factors led to the evacuation of St Kilda. The islands' inhabitants had existed for centuries in relative isolation until tourism and the presence of the military during the First World War led the islanders to seek alternatives to privations they routinely suffered. The changes made to the island by visitors in the 19th century disconnected the islanders from the way of life that had allowed their forebears to survive in this environment. Despite the construction of a small jetty in 1902, the islands remained at the weather's mercy. (Note: Even in the 21st century this is a problem. The National Trust reported in 2006 that it was cancelling 2007 work parties as "adverse weather conditions resulted in our supplies failing to reach St Kilda and our next opportunity to get supplies out is May 2007.")

After the end of the Great War, most of the young men left the island, and the population fell from 73 in 1920 to 37 in 1928. After the death of four men from influenza in 1926, there was a succession of crop failures in the 1920s. Investigations by the University of Aberdeen into the soil where crops had been grown have shown that there had been contamination by lead and other pollutants, caused by the use of seabird carcasses and peat ash in the manure used on the fields. This occurred over a lengthy period of time, as manuring practices became more intensive, and may have been a factor in the evacuation.

The last straw came with the death of a young woman, Mary Gillies, who fell ill with appendicitis in January 1930 and was taken to the mainland for treatment. She died in hospital, having given birth to a daughter who also died. It was assumed that she had died of appendicitis, but her son Norman John Gillies discovered in 1991 that she had died of pneumonia. All the cattle and sheep were taken off the island two days before the evacuation by the tourist boat Dunara Castle for sale on the mainland. However, all the island's working dogs were drowned in the bay because they could not be taken. Although the cats were left behind, many did not survive the winter. In 1931, the remaining cats were shot to protect the native birds and rodents. On 29 August 1930, the ship HMS Harebell took the remaining 36 inhabitants to Morvern on the Scottish mainland, a decision they took collectively themselves.

The morning of the evacuation promised a perfect day. The sun rose out of a calm and sparkling sea and warmed the impassive cliffs of Oiseval. The sky was hopelessly blue and the sight of Hirta, green and pleasant as the island of so many careless dreams, made parting all the more difficult. Observing tradition the islanders left an open Bible and a small pile of oats in each house, locked all the doors and at 7 am boarded the Harebell. Although exhausted by the strain and hard work of the last few days, they were reported to have stayed cheerful throughout the operation. But as the long antler of Dun fell back onto the horizon and the familiar outline of the island grew faint, the severing of an ancient tie became a reality and the St Kildans gave way to tears.

One source states that "officials found forestry work for the men, and most of them were settled at Lochaline near Oban, while other families went to live at Strome Ferry, Ross-shire, Culcabock near Inverness, and at Culross, Fife". Barclay visited the resettled islanders and found that some were experiencing difficulties with disillusionment and adjustment, which she reported to the Scottish Department of Health. The last of the native St Kildans, Rachel Johnson, died in 2016 at the age of 93, having been evacuated at the age of eight.

In 1931, the laird, Sir Reginald MacLeod of MacLeod, sold the islands to Lord Dumfries, later the 5th Marquess of Bute. For the next 26 years they saw few people, save for the occasional summer visitors or a returning St Kildan family. Lord Dumfries was an ornithologist and bought the islands to preserve them as a bird sanctuary, leaving them to the National Trust for Scotland on his death in 1956.

The story of St Kilda has attracted artistic interpretations, including Michael Powell's 1937 film The Edge of the World, the novel The Lost Lights of St Kilda by Elisabeth Gifford, and an opera.

Year	1758	1764	~1799	1841	1851	1852	1861	1911	1913	1927	1930
Population	88	90	just under 100	105	112	76	71	74	75 to 80	47	36

=== Military occupation ===
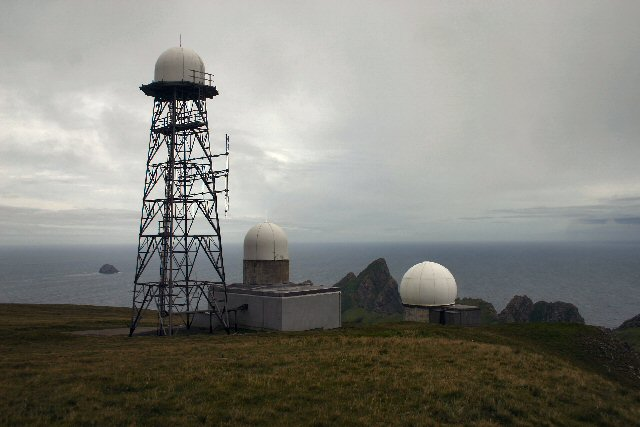
The tracking tower on Mullach Sgar.

The islands saw no military activity during the Second World War, remaining uninhabited, but three aircraft crash sites remain from that period. A Bristol Beaufighter LX798 based at RAF Port Ellen on Islay crashed into Conachair within 100 metres (330 ft) of the summit on the night of 3–4 June 1943. A year later, just before midnight on 7 June 1944, the day after D-Day, a Short Sunderland flying boat ML858 was wrecked at the head of Gleann Mòr. A small plaque in the church is dedicated to those who died in this accident.

A Vickers Wellington bomber crashed on the south coast of Soay in 1942 or 1943. Not until 1978 was any formal attempt made to investigate the wreck, and its identity has not been absolutely determined. Amongst the wreckage, a Royal Canadian Air Force cap badge was discovered, which suggests it may have been HX448 of 7 Operational Training Unit which went missing on a navigation exercise on 28 September 1942. Alternatively, it has been suggested that the Wellington is LA995 of 303 Ferry Training Unit which was lost on 23 February 1943.

In 1955 the British government decided to incorporate St Kilda into a missile-tracking range based in Benbecula, where test firings and flights are carried out. Thus in 1957 St Kilda became permanently inhabited once again. A variety of military buildings and masts have since been erected, including a canteen (which is not open to the public), the Puff Inn. The Ministry of Defence (MOD) leases St Kilda from the National Trust for Scotland for a nominal fee.

Hirta is still occupied year-round by a small number of civilians employed by defence contractor QinetiQ working in the military base (MOD Hebrides) on a monthly rotation. In 2009 the MOD announced that it was considering closing down its missile-testing ranges in the Western Isles, potentially leaving the Hirta base unmanned. In 2015 the base had to be temporarily evacuated due to adverse weather conditions.

In summer 2018, the MOD facilities were being restored as part of building a new base; one report stated that the project included "replacing aged generators and accommodation blocks". With no permanent population, the island population can vary between 20 and 70, most living here temporarily. These inhabitants include MOD employees, National Trust for Scotland employees, and several scientists working on a Soay sheep research project.

== 21st-century tourism ==
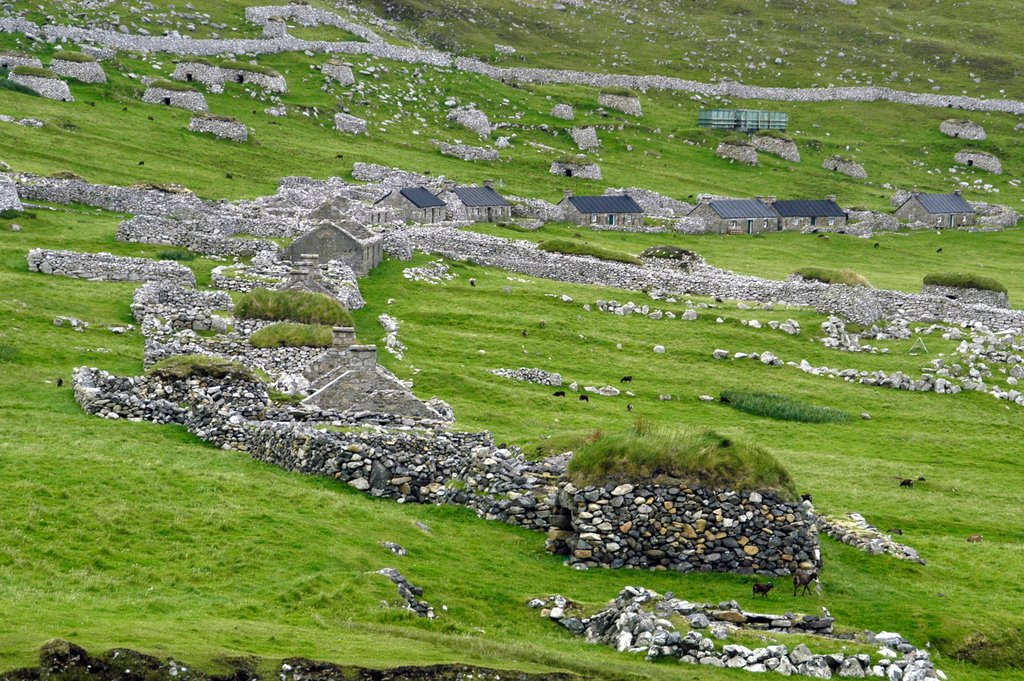
Village Bay (St Kilda Village), Hirta; 2010

Visits to St Kilda were encouraged until facilities closed due to the worldwide COVID-19 pandemic in 2020 but it has since reopened.

The National Trust for Scotland has improved the village on Hirta over the years. "They have reroofed the cottages on the main street, restored the church, and re-stacked stones that years of gales had toppled from the cleits, or bothies, that dot the volcanic landscape". One cottage, #3 on "The Street" has been more extensively restored and turned into the museum. However, a full restoration of the other cottages is not expected.

The Historic Environment Scotland website states that "the plain, two-bay church, with the schoolroom added to its north west in 1898" was "restored as they might have appeared in the 1920s." The site also explains that the "arrangement of St Kilda Village along a curving street is the result of mid-19th century improvement ... Distinctive drystone storage structures, known as cleitan, are scattered throughout the landscape. There are over 1,400 cleitan known throughout the St Kilda archipelago, but they are concentrated in the area around the village".

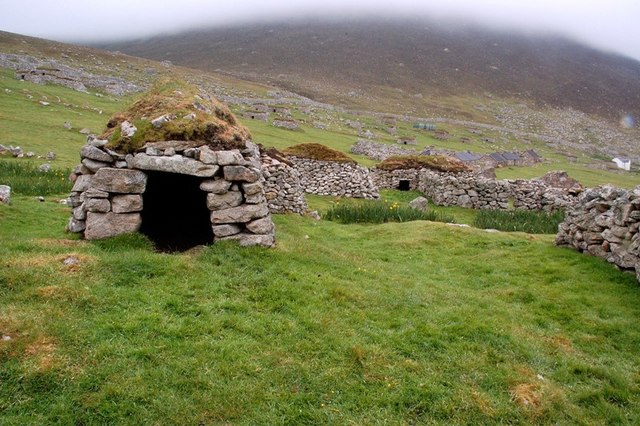
A Cleit (storage shed)

The National Trust for Scotland suggests that there is a great deal of interest in diving in the area as well as viewing of seabirds in "Europe's most important seabird colony, and one of the major seabird breeding stations in the North Atlantic. A review of St Kilda in 2019 warned that landing at the pier can be difficult in rough seas.

== Architecture ==
=== Prehistoric buildings ===
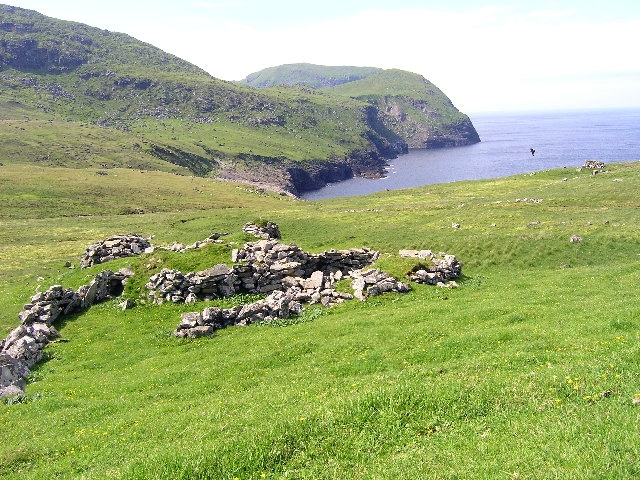
Ruins in Gleann Mòr

The oldest structures on St Kilda are the most enigmatic. Large sheepfolds lie inland from the existing village at An Lag Bho'n Tuath (English: the hollow in the north) and contain curious "boat-shaped" stone rings, or "settings". Soil samples suggest a date of 1850 BC, but they are unique to St Kilda, and their purpose is unknown. In Gleann Mòr, (north-west of Village Bay beyond Hirta's central ridge), there are 20 "horned structures", essentially ruined buildings with a main court measuring about 3 by 3 metres (10 by 10 ft), two or more smaller cells and a forecourt formed by two curved or horn-shaped walls. Again, nothing like them exists anywhere else in Europe, and their original use is unknown. Also in Gleann Mòr is Taigh na Banaghaisgeich, the "Amazon's House". As Martin (1703) reported, many St Kilda tales are told about this female warrior.

This Amazon is famous in their traditions: her house or dairy of stone is yet extant; some of the inhabitants dwell in it all summer, though it be some hundred years old; the whole is built of stone, without any wood, lime, earth, or mortar to cement it, and is built in form of a circle pyramid-wise towards the top, having a vent in it, the fire being always in the centre of the floor; the stones are long and thin, which supplies the defect of wood; the body of this house contains not above nine persons sitting; there are three beds or low vaults that go off the side of the wall, a pillar betwixt each bed, which contains five men apiece; at the entry to one of these low vaults is a stone standing upon one end fix'd; upon this they say she ordinarily laid her helmet; there are two stones on the other side, upon which she is reported to have laid her sword: she is said to have been much addicted to hunting, and that in her time all the space betwixt this isle and that of Harries, was one continued tract of dry land.

Similar stories of a female warrior who hunted the now-submerged land between the Outer Hebrides and St Kilda are reported from Harris. The structure's forecourt is akin to the other "horned structures" in the immediate area, but like Martin's "Amazon" its original purpose is the stuff of legend rather than archaeological fact.

Much more is known of the hundreds of unique cleitean that decorate the archipelago. These dome-shaped structures are constructed of flat boulders with a cap of turf on the top. This enables the wind to pass through the cavities in the wall but keeps the rain out. They were used for storing peat, nets, grain, preserved flesh and eggs, manure, and hay, and as a shelter for lambs in winter. The date of origin of this St Kildan invention is unknown, but they were in continuous use from prehistoric times until the 1930 evacuation. More than 1,200 ruined or intact cleitean remain on Hirta and a further 170 on the neighbouring islands. House no. 16 in the modern village has an early Christian stone cross built into the front wall, which may date from the 7th century.

=== Medieval village ===
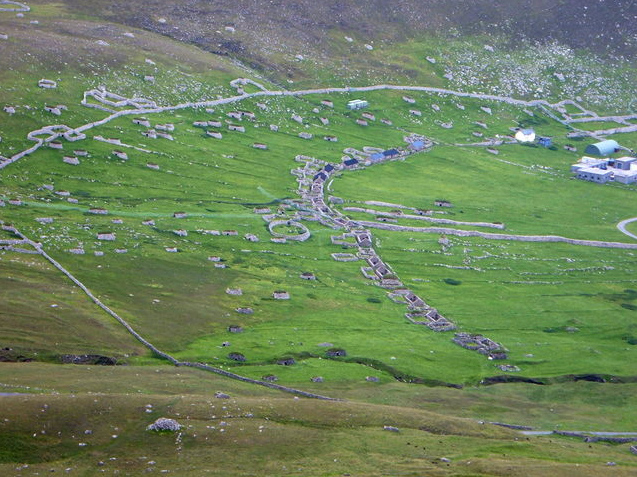
The Village. The Head Wall surrounds the site, with Tobar Childa top left, the 19th-century Street at the centre and the new military base to the right.

A medieval village lay near Tobar Childa, about 350 metres (1,150 ft) from the shore, at the foot of the slopes of Conachair. The oldest building is an underground passage with two small annexes called Taigh an t-Sithiche (house of the faeries) which dates to between 500 BC and 300 AD. The St Kildans believed it was a house or hiding place, although a more recent theory suggests that it was an ice house.

Extensive ruins of field walls and cleitean and the remnants of a medieval "house" with a beehive-shaped annexe remain. Nearby is the "Bull's House", a roofless rectangular structure in which the island's bull was kept during winter. Tobar Childa itself is supplied by two springs that lie just outside the Head Wall that was constructed around the Village to prevent sheep and cattle gaining access to the cultivated areas within its boundary. There were 25 to 30 houses altogether. Most were blackhouses of typical Hebridean design, but some older buildings were made of corbelled stone and turfed rather than thatched. The turf was used to prevent the ingress of wind and rain, and the older "beehive" buildings resembled green hillocks rather than dwellings.

=== Post-Medieval structures ===
The Head Wall was built in 1834 when the medieval village was abandoned and a new one planned between Tobar Childa and the sea some 700 feet (210 m) down the slope. This came about as the result of a visit by Sir Thomas Dyke Ackland, one of the Members of Parliament for Devon. Appalled by the primitive conditions, he gave money for the building of a completely new settlement of thirty new blackhouses. These houses were made of dry stone, had thick walls, and were roofed with turf. Each typically had only one tiny window and a small opening for letting out smoke from the peat fire that burnt in the middle of the room. As a result, the interiors were blackened by soot. The cattle occupied one end of the house in winter, and once a year the straw from the floor was stripped out and spread on the ground.

In October 1860, several of the new dwellings were damaged by a severe gale, and repairs were sufficient only to make them suitable for use as byres. According to Alasdair MacGregor's analysis of the settlement, the sixteen modern, zinc-roofed cottages amidst the black houses and new Factor's house seen in most photographs of the native islanders were constructed around 1862.

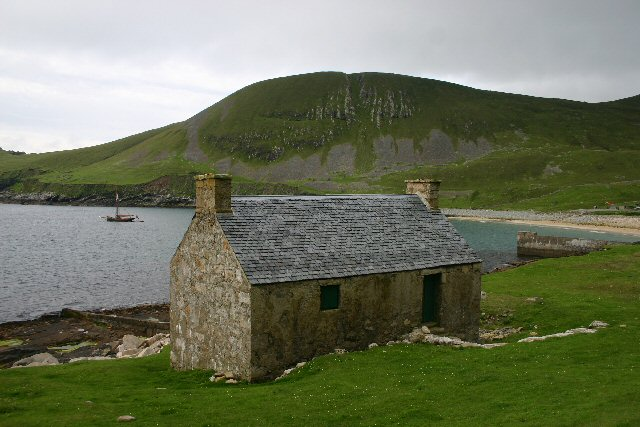
The Feather Store, where fulmar and gannet feathers were kept, and sold to pay the rent

One of the more poignant ruins on Hirta is the site of "Lady Grange's House". Lady Grange had been married to the Jacobite sympathiser James Erskine, Lord Grange, for 25 years when he decided that she might have overheard too many of his treasonable plottings. He had her kidnapped and secretly confined in Edinburgh for six months. From there she was sent to the Monach Isles, where she lived in isolation for two years. She was then taken to Hirta from 1734 to 1740, which she described as "a vile neasty, stinking poor isle". After a failed rescue attempt, she was removed on her husband's orders to the Isle of Skye, where she died. The "house" on Hirta which carries her name is a large cleit in the Village meadows.

Boswell and Johnson discussed the subject during their 1773 tour of the Hebrides. Boswell wrote: "After dinner to-day, we talked of the extraordinary fact of Lady Grange's being sent to St Kilda, and confined there for several years, without any means of relief. Dr Johnson said, if M'Leod would let it be known that he had such a place for naughty ladies, he might make it a very profitable island."

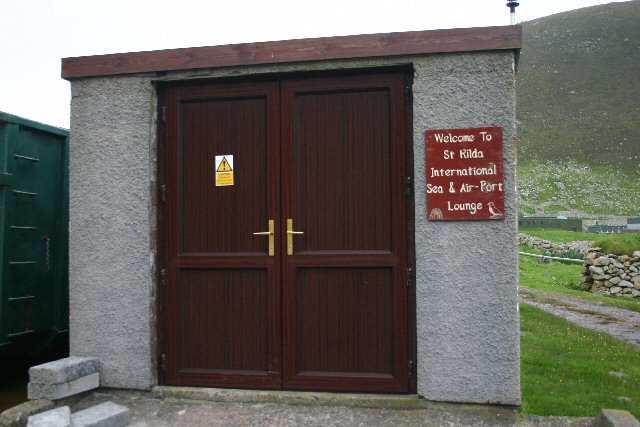
This "International Sea & Airport Lounge" is situated adjacent to the helipad and landing craft slipway.

In the 1860s unsuccessful attempts were made to improve the landing area by blasting rocks. A small jetty was erected in 1877, but it was washed away in a storm two years later. In 1883 representations to the Napier Commission suggested the building of a replacement, but it was 1901 before the Congested Districts Board provided an engineer to enable one to be completed the following year. Nearby on the shoreline are some huge boulders which were known throughout the Highlands and Islands in the 19th century as Doirneagan Hirt, Hirta's pebbles.

At one time, three churches stood on Hirta. Christ Church, in the site of the graveyard at the centre of the village, was in use in 1697 and was the largest, but this thatched-roof structure was too small to hold the entire population, and most of the congregation had to gather in the churchyard during services. St Brendan's Church lay over a kilometre away on the slopes of Ruival, and St Columba's at the west end of the village street, but little is left of these buildings. A new kirk and manse were erected at the east end of the village in 1830 and a Factor's house in 1860.

=== Buildings on other islands ===
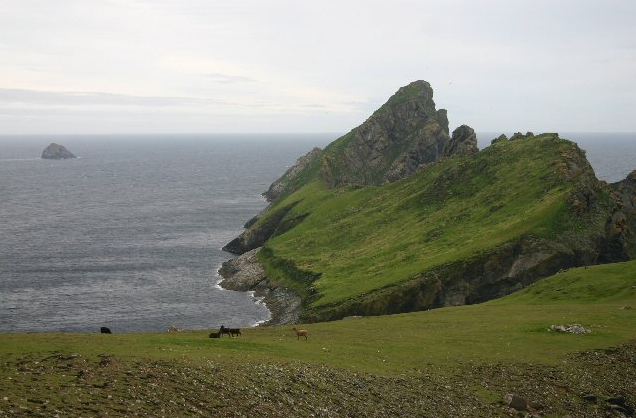
Dùn from Ruival with Stac Levenish in the background at left

Dùn means "fort", and there is but a single ruined wall of a structure said to have been built in the far-distant past by the Fir Bolg. The only "habitation" is Sean Taigh (old house), a natural cavern sometimes used as a shelter by the St Kildans when they were tending the sheep or catching birds. Soay has a primitive hut known as Taigh Dugan (Dugan's house). This is little more than an excavated hole under a massive stone with two crude walls on the sides. The story of its creation relates to two sheep-stealing brothers from Lewis who came to St Kilda only to cause further trouble. Dugan was exiled to Soay, where he died; the other, called Fearchar Mòr, was sent to Stac an Armin, where he found life so intolerable he cast himself into the sea.

Boreray boasts the Cleitean MacPhàidein, a "cleit village" of three small bothies used on a regular basis during fowling expeditions. Here too are the ruins of Taigh Stallar (the steward's house), which was similar to the Amazon's house in Gleann Mòr although somewhat larger, and which had six bed spaces. The local tradition was that it was built by the "Man of the Rocks", who led a rebellion against the landlord's steward. It may be an example of an Iron Age wheelhouse and the associated remains of an agricultural field system were discovered in 2011. As a result of a smallpox outbreak on Hirta in 1724, three men and eight boys were marooned on Boreray until the following May. No fewer than 78 storage cleitean exist on Stac an Armin and a small bothy. A small bothy exists on the precipitous Stac Lee too, also used by fowlers.

== Fauna and flora ==
=== Wildlife ===
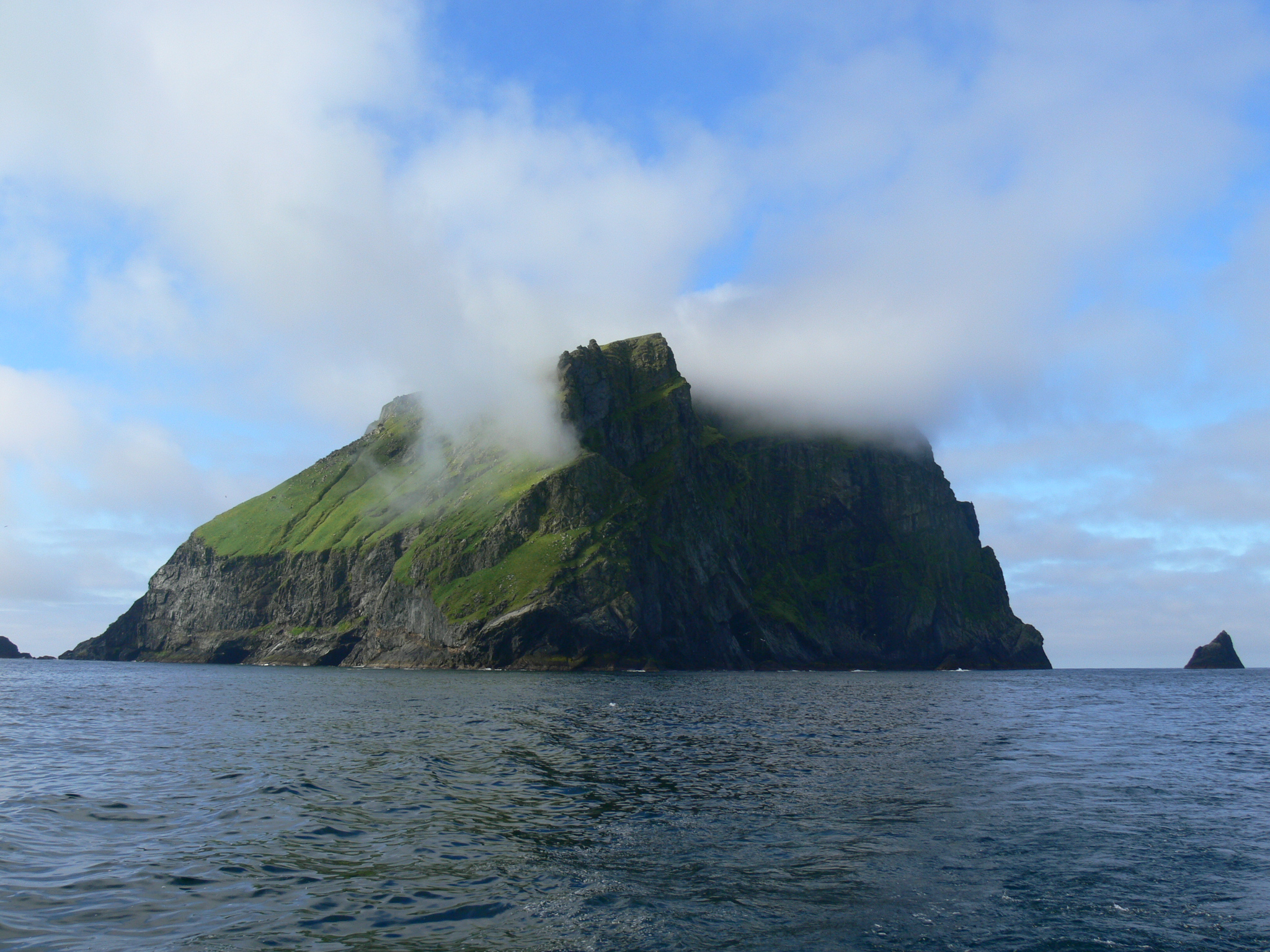
Soay shrouded in mist

St Kilda is a breeding ground for many important seabird species. One of the world's largest colonies of northern gannets, totalling 30,000 pairs, amount to 24 per cent of the global population. There are 49,000 breeding pairs of Leach's petrels, up to 90 per cent of the European population; 136,000 pairs of Atlantic puffins, about 30 per cent of the UK total breeding population, and 67,000 northern fulmar pairs, about 13 per cent of the UK total. Dùn is home to the largest colony of fulmars in Britain. Before 1828, St Kilda was their only UK breeding ground, but they have since spread and established colonies elsewhere, such as Fowlsheugh. The last great auk (Pinguinus impennis) seen in Britain was killed on Stac an Armin in July 1840. Unusual behaviour by St Kilda's bonxies was recorded in 2007 during research into recent falls in the Leach's petrel population. Using night-vision gear, ecologists observed the skuas hunting petrels at night, a remarkable strategy for a seabird. The St Kilda archipelago has been recognised as an Important Bird Area (IBA) by BirdLife International for its seabird colonies.

Two wild animal taxa are unique to St Kilda: the St Kilda wren (Troglodytes troglodytes hirtensis), which is a subspecies of the Eurasian wren, and a subspecies of wood mouse known as the St Kilda field mouse (Apodemus sylvaticus hirtensis). A third taxon endemic to St Kilda, a subspecies of house mouse known as the St Kilda house mouse (Mus musculus muralis), vanished entirely after the departure of human inhabitants, as it was strictly associated with settlements and buildings. It had several traits in common with a sub-species (Mus musculus mykinessiensis) found on Mykines island in the Faroe Islands. The grey seal (Halichoerus grypus) now breeds on Hirta but did not do so before the 1930 evacuation.

The archipelago's isolation has resulted in a lack of biodiversity. The most successful colonists with nearly two hundred species are the flies followed by beetles with approximately 140 species. There are no bees on the islands, so flies are probably important pollinators of plants. One beetle, the rare and endangered weevil, Ceutorhynchus insularis, is known from only Dùn and the Westmann Islands, an archipelago off the south-west coast of Iceland. Less than one hundred species of butterfly and moth occur, compared to 367 recorded on the Western Isles. Red admiral (Vanessa atalanta) and painted lady (Vanessa cardui) are two of only seven species of butterflies, both well known and common migrants. Common summer moths are the antler (Cerapteryx graminis), dark arches (Apamea monoglypha) and the migrant silver Y (Autographa gamma). One unusual moth recorded is the least carpet (Idaea rusticata), an occasional migrant, and in the UK, usually recorded in the south-east of England. On 4 September 2014 a rare vagrant oleander hawk-moth (Daphnis nerii) was recorded. Oleander is not found in the UK every year, and the larva has never been recorded in Britain.

Its plant life is heavily influenced by island's natural environment such as the salt spray, strong winds and acidic peaty soils. No trees grow on the archipelago, although there are more than 130 different flowering plants, 162 species of fungi and 160 bryophytes. Several rarities exist amongst the 194 lichen species. Kelp thrives in the surrounding seas, which contain a diversity of unusual marine invertebrates. The St Kilda dandelion (Taraxacum pankhurstianum) is an endemic species of dandelion, identified in 2012.

The beach at Village Bay is unusual in that its short stretch of summer sand recedes in winter, exposing the large boulders on which it rests. A survey of the beach in 1953 found only a single resident species, the crustacean isopod Eurydice pulchra.

=== Soay sheep ===
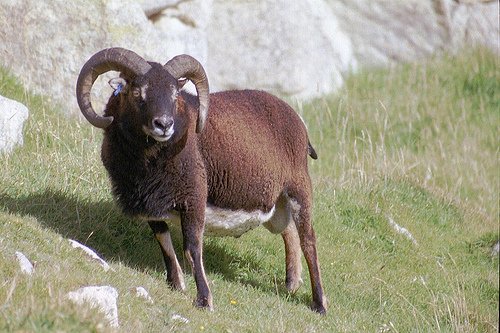
Soay ram on Hirta

On the inaccessible island of Soay are sheep of a unique type, which lived as feral animals and belonged to the owner of the islands, not to the islanders. These Soay sheep are believed to be remnants of the earliest sheep kept in Europe in the Neolithic Era, and are small, short-tailed, usually brown with white bellies, and have naturally moulting fleeces. About 200 Soay sheep remain on Soay itself, and soon after the evacuation a second feral population of them was established on Hirta, which at that time had no sheep; in 1994 these numbered between 600 and 1,700. A few Soays have been exported to form breeding populations in other parts of the world, where they are valued for their hardiness, small size and unusual appearance. On Hirta and Soay, the sheep prefer the Plantago pastures, which grow well in locations exposed to sea spray and include red fescue (Festuca rubra), sea plantain (Plantago maritima) and sea pink (Armeria maritima).

The Soay sheep on Hirta are the subject of long-term ecological and evolutionary research, because of their biological background and isolation.

The St Kildans kept up to 2,000 of a different type of sheep on the islands of Hirta and Boreray. These were a Hebridean variety of the Scottish Dunface, a primitive sheep probably similar to those kept throughout Britain during the Iron Age. During the evacuation, all the islanders' sheep were removed from Hirta, but those on Boreray were left to become feral. These sheep are now regarded as a breed in their own right, the Boreray. The Boreray is one of the rarest British sheep and is one of the few remaining descendants of the Dunface (although some Scottish Blackface blood was introduced in the 19th century).

== Nature conservation ==
On his death on 14 August 1956, the Marquess of Bute's will bequeathed the archipelago to the National Trust for Scotland provided they accepted the offer within six months. After much soul-searching, the executive committee agreed to do so in January 1957. The slow renovation and conservation of the village began, much of it undertaken by summer volunteer work parties. In addition, scientific research began on the feral Soay sheep population and other aspects of the natural environment. In 1957 the area was designated a national nature reserve.

In 1986 the islands became the first place in Scotland to be inscribed as a UNESCO World Heritage Site, for its terrestrial natural features. In 2004, the WHS was extended to include a large amount of the surrounding marine features as well as the islands themselves. In 2005, St Kilda became one of only two dozen global locations to be awarded mixed World Heritage Status for both "natural" and "cultural" significance. The islands share this honour with internationally important sites such as Machu Picchu in Peru, Mount Athos in Greece and the Ukhahlamba/Drakensberg Park in South Africa.

St Kilda is a Scheduled Ancient Monument, a National Scenic Area and a Site of Special Scientific Interest. The St Kilda archipelago and the seas surrounding it are a Special Protection Area. An additional Special Protection Area covers the seas off St Kilda beyond the Special Protection Area described above.

Visiting yachts may find shelter in Village Bay, but those wishing to land are told to contact the National Trust for Scotland in advance. Concern exists about the introduction of non-native animal and plant species into such a fragile environment. In 2008 the National Trust for Scotland received the support of Scotland's Minister for Environment, Michael Russell for their plan to ensure no rats came ashore from the Spinningdale, a UK-registered/Spanish-owned fishing trawler which grounded on Hirta on 1 February. There was concern that bird life on the island could be seriously affected. Fortunately, potential contaminants from the vessel including fuel, oils, bait and stores were successfully removed by Dutch salvage company Mammoet before the bird breeding season in early April.

St Kilda's marine environment of underwater caves, arches and chasms, offers a very challenging but superlative diving experience. Such is the power of the North Atlantic swell that the effects of the waves can be detected 70 metres (230 ft) below sea level.

== See also ==
- St Kilda, Britain's Loneliest Isle (1928 silent film)
- Lady of St Kilda, ship that gave its name to St Kilda, Victoria; wrecked in 1844
- Mingulay – the "near St Kilda"
- John Sands, a Scottish journalist mockingly described by his enemies as "the MP for St Kilda"
- Scarp – a Hebridean island that had a "parliament" similar to St Kilda's
- North Rona – most remote island in the UK
- World Heritage Sites in Scotland
- List of outlying islands of Scotland
- List of Important Bird Areas in the United Kingdom
