= John Sands (journalist) =

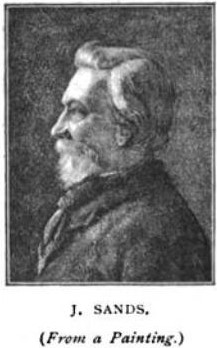
John Sands

John Sands (1826–1900) of Ormiston was a Scottish freelance journalist and artist who also had an interest in archaeology and folk customs, especially the way of life on Scottish islands. He spent almost a year on St Kilda and lived on several other remote islands.

== St Kilda ==
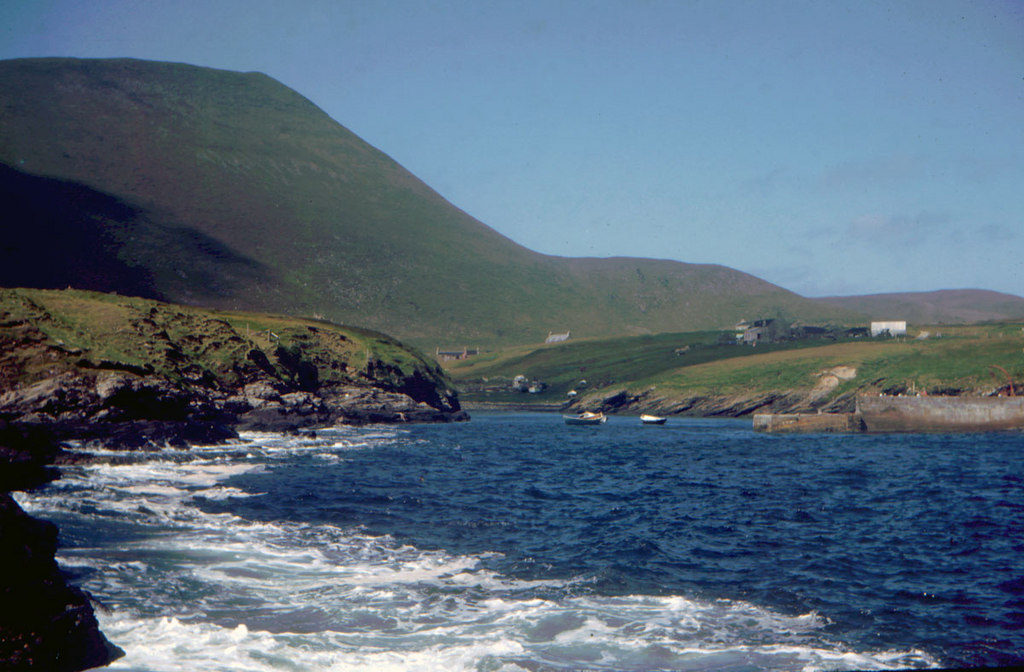
Da Voe, the main anchorage of Foula

St Kilda is an isolated outlying archipelago in the Outer Hebrides of Scotland, and Sands played an important role in bringing the plight of the islanders to the world's attention. On his second visit Sands became stranded there in the winter of 1876–7, and during that time invented the "mailboat" by attaching a message to a lifebuoy salvaged from the wreck of the Peti Dubrovacki and throwing it into the sea. His book Out of the World was published in 1878 after his two visits to the archipelago in 1875 and 1876–7.

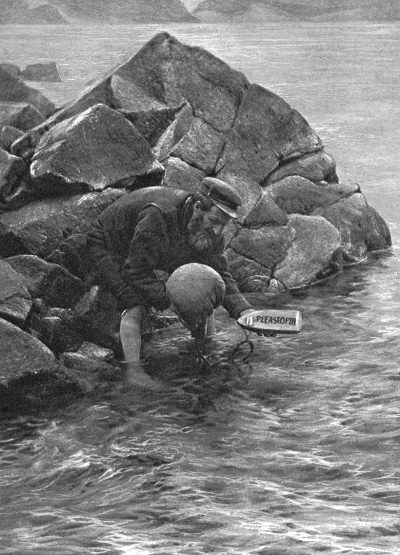
Launching the St Kilda mailboat.

In 1877 he excavated the Taigh an t-Sithiche, an Iron Age souterrain. This unearthed the remains of gannet, sheep, cattle and limpets amidst various stone tools. The building is between 1,700 and 2,500 years old, which suggests that the St Kildan diet had changed little over the millennia. Indeed, the tools were recognised by the St Kildans, who could put names to them as similar devices were still in use. He publicly supported the St Kildans by, for example, writing to The Scotsman newspaper criticising MacLeod of Dunvegan, the island's landlord, for exploiting the residents. He also discovered that the Kelsall Fund, a bequest set up in 1860 to support the island's infrastructure, was unknown to the islanders more than fifteen years later and argued that those who paid taxes on tobacco and whisky were entitled to public services such as postal deliveries. It is possible his visits to St Kilda were in part prompted by his romantic interest in a young woman who lived there.

Sands spoke a little Gaelic and his only reading material whilst there was a Gaelic bible. He spent nearly a year on St Kilda all told, but his outspoken views created enemies. For example, George Seton published St Kilda in 1878 and:

using ridicule, traditional right-wing rhetoric and sarcasm, he sought to discredit Sands, calling him 'the theoretical philanthropist' and mocking his claims to divine inspiration.

Nonetheless, Sands's efforts were influential in creating a regular steamer service to Hirta, the only permanently settled island of the St Kilda group.

== Other islands ==
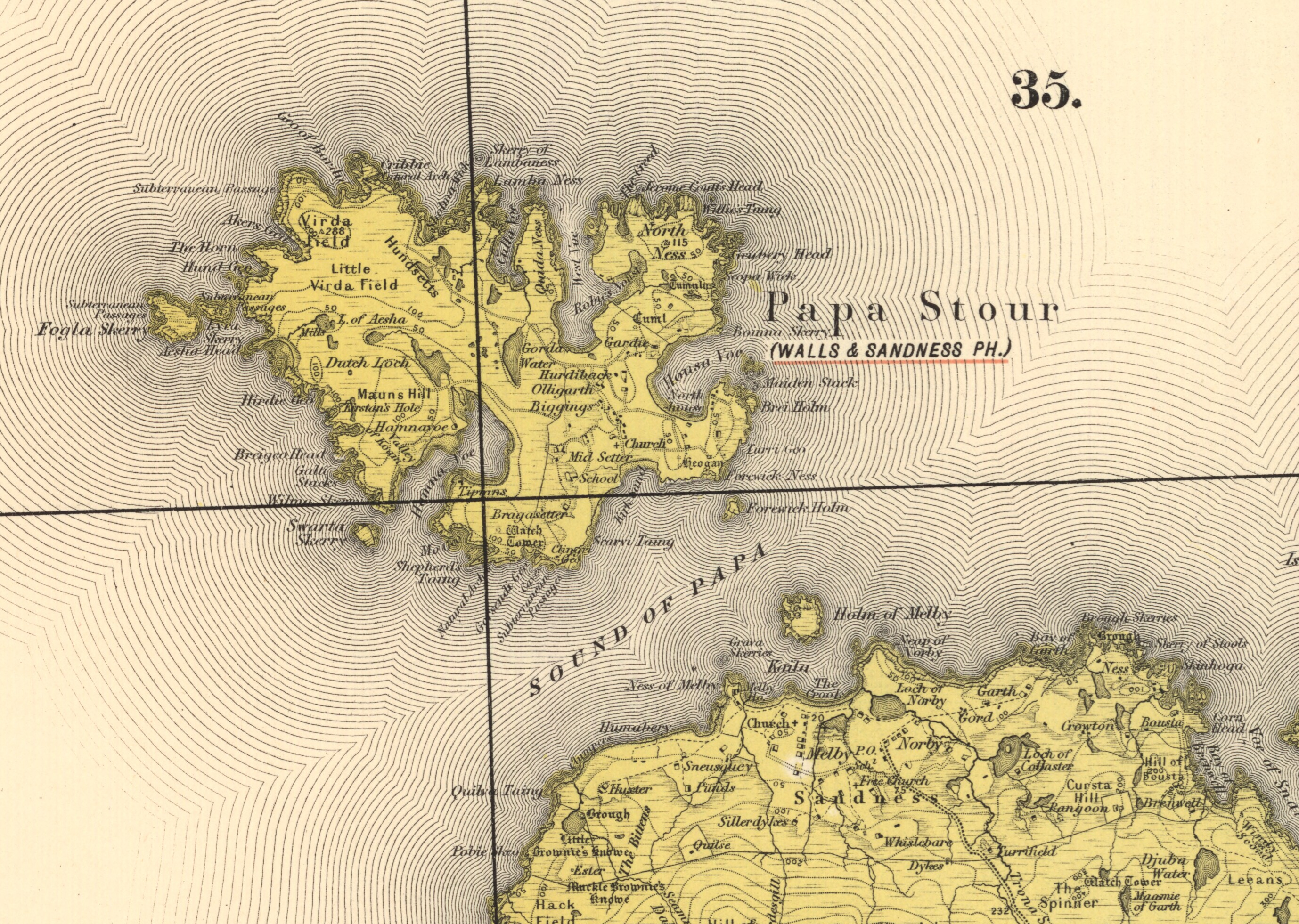
1890s Ordnance Survey map of Papa Stour

Sands also spent time on the remote Scottish islands of Vaila, Papa Stour and Foula in Shetland, and also lived on Tiree in the Inner Hebrides and the Faroe Islands. Whilst on Foula he fought hard against the prevailing truck system and created political cartoons lampooning its deficiencies. In one, he drew Foula as a beautiful young woman being strangled by a boa-constrictor labelled 'landlordism' watched by other reptiles called 'missionary', 'laird' and 'truck'.

== Later career ==
Sands spent the rest of his career as a freelance journalist, artist and poet, writing humorous articles for Punch magazine. He is occasionally described as a Member of Parliament. This may be due to a misinterpretation of his appointment in 1876 by the people of St Kilda as their fear-ionaid or representative in their attempt to arrange for a steamer to call twice yearly at the island. Seton mockingly described him as the "M.P. for St Kilda".
