= Williamina Barclay =

Scottish nurse

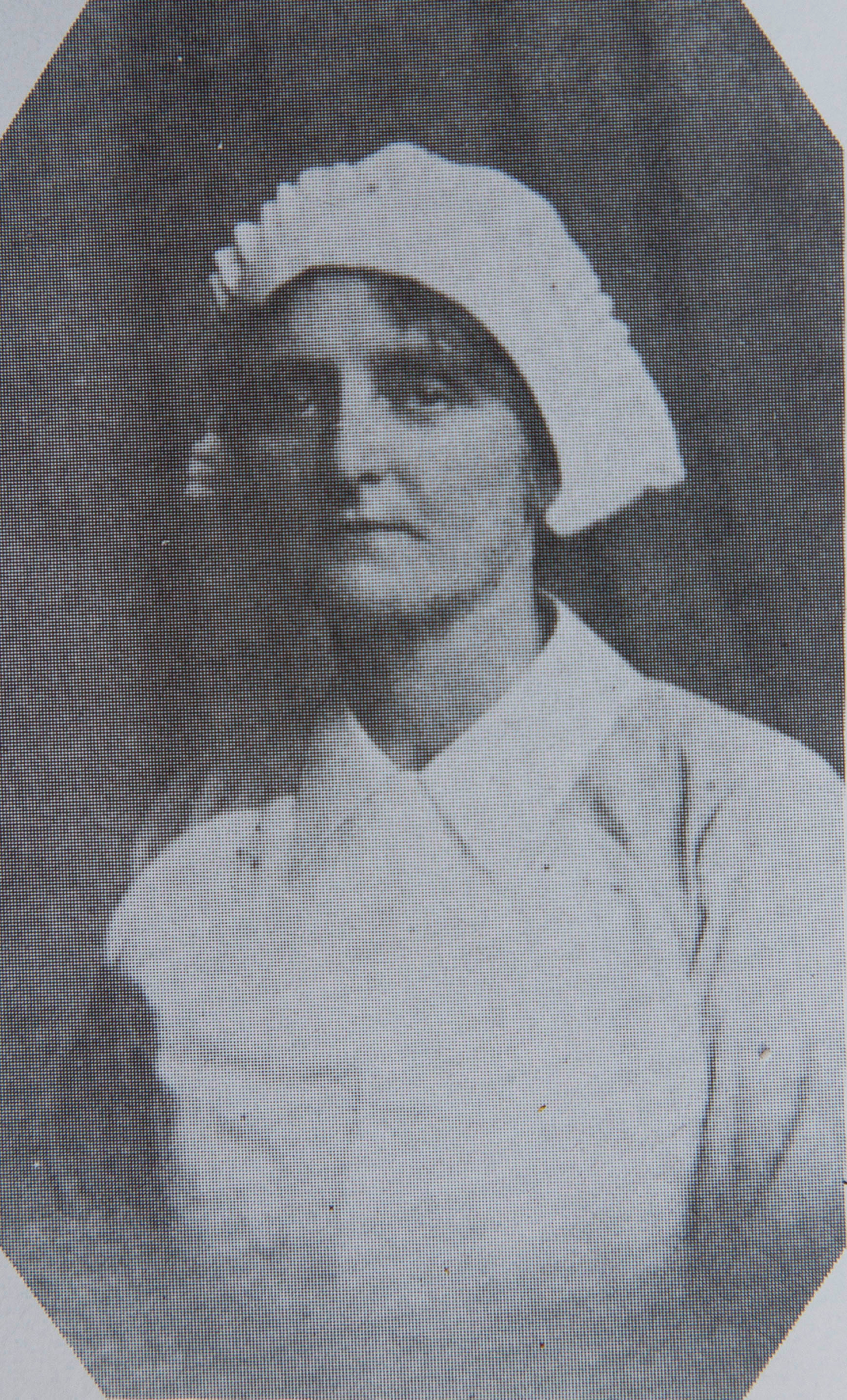
- Born: 5 March 1883; Glasgow, Scotland
- Died: 15 July 1975 (aged 92); Paisley, Scotland
- Occupation: Nurse

Williamina McIntosh Barclay MBE (5 March 1883 – 15 July 1975) was a nurse who was one of the main initiators of the evacuation of the Scottish archipelago St Kilda.

== Biography ==
Barclay was born in Glasgow to Jessie Maxwell and Andrew Barclay, who was an engineer. In 1922, Barclay qualified as a state registered nurse at Glasgow Royal Infirmary. Afterwards, she became a district nurse in Glasgow and trained as a midwife in Dundee. She had been acknowledged as a Queen's Nurse for over five years before she was offered a nurse post on Hirta, the largest island in St Kilda, in 1928.

== St Kilda evacuation ==
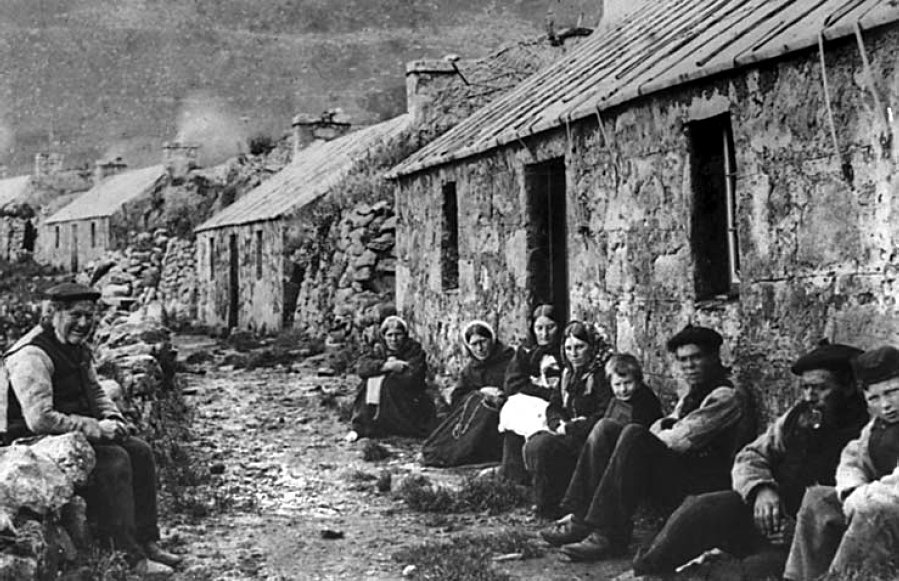
St Kildans sitting on the village street, 1886.

Once Barclay arrived on the island, she was faced with the poor conditions the islanders were living in. Disease and migration during the 1920s had thinned out the population and the community was struggling to produce enough food to sustain itself. The severity of these conditions peaked during the harsh winter of 1929–1930, which caused several islanders to question whether they should continue living on St Kilda. Even though Barclay did not speak Gaelic and most of the islanders were not very fluent in English, she managed to build a relationship with the islanders. Throughout her time on the island, she reported several of her observations to the Scottish Department of Health officials and raised awareness about the conditions at the island. In April 1930, Barclay suggested the possibility of evacuation to the islanders over tea and convinced several of the islanders. She would later go on to assist the islanders, together with the missionary and schoolteacher Dugald Munro, in drawing up an official petition to request assistance with the evacuation and resettlement on the mainland. The majority of islanders signed the petition.

As of 1930, thirteen men, ten women, eight girls and five boys lived in St Kilda, all on Hirta. The 10 households rented cottages from the landowner, with the other six cottages being unoccupied. The evacuation was encouraged by Barclay who was very concerned about health issues, especially after the deaths of two young women. The islanders finally agreed and the majority signed a petition on 10 May 1930, stating that "it would be impossible to stay on the island another winter." The plan was supported by Dugald Munro, the missionary and schoolteacher, and by Nurse Barclay.

Barclay was appointed the government's representative on St Kilda in June 1930 and as such she bore responsibility for the planning of the evacuation and aiding resettlement of thirty-six St Kildans on the mainland, including the movement of their sheep. On 29 August 1930 she sailed on HMS Harebell with the islanders to Lochaline, where the islanders would initially make their new homes. Barclay visited all of the resettled islanders and found that some were experiencing difficulties with the disillusionment and adjustment, which she reported to the Scottish Department of Health. She was awarded the MBE in 1931.

One reliable source states that "officials found forestry work for the men, and most of them were settled at Lochaline near Oban, while other families went to live at Strome Ferry, Ross-shire, Culcabock near Inverness, and at Culross, Fife".
