= Ewen Gillies =

Scottish serial emigrant from St. Kilda

Ewen Gillies (born 1825), also known as 'California Gillies', was a pioneering adventurer and serial emigrant from the remote Scottish island of Hirta, St Kilda. During a lifetime punctuated by migration, he settled for periods of time in Australia, New Zealand, California and possibly Canada, but returned home on three occasions to live in the small remote community on Hirta, the only inhabited island in the small rocky St Kilda archipelago, which has been described as Scotland's most remote and isolated island community, located in the Atlantic Ocean over 40 miles west of the Outer Hebrides.

== Early life ==
Ewen was born in 1825 to John and Mary Gillies. The Gillies family was a large clan whose origins can be traced to the settlers that came to St Kilda from the Isle of Skye and Harris in the eighteenth century after a smallpox outbreak had reduced the St Kilda population to 42. Ewen spent his childhood on the island and in 1849 he married Margaret McDonald, the beautiful daughter of a respected Island elder. In the 1851 census, Ewen is shown as 24 years old and Margaret as 19, and 33 of the St Kilda population of 110 were members of the Gillies family.

== First emigration (1852) ==
His first voyage started in 1852, when he, his wife and their baby daughter Mary were among 36 St Kildans who decided to emigrate to Australia with the help of the Highland and Island Emigration Society, reducing the population of the island to 70. He sold his croft, furniture and other belongings, raising £17, and they set off in September 1852, first by boat to Skye, then with 400 other emigrants to Glasgow on the steamer Islay, arriving on 1 October. On the following day they travelled by ship to Birkenhead. The owner of St Kilda, Sir John MacLeod, tried without success to persuade some of the group to return to the island, offering to pay for their passage plus two years' living allowance. When they were unconvinced, he generously paid for their voyage to Australia, and they boarded the ship Priscilla and sailed on 13 October 1852. Unfortunately, an epidemic onboard resulted in 80 passenger deaths, of whom 18 were members of the St Kilda group, including the Gillies's young daughter. The ship arrived at Port Phillip on 19 January 1853, but quarantine regulations delayed disembarkation.

Gillies and his wife settled near Melbourne in a new area called Little Brighton that had lost most of its labour force in the 1852 gold rush. Gillies worked for George Walstab as a brickmaker for six months, but is reported to have been sacked for laziness. They then set off for the goldfields, and during the next two years found sufficient gold to buy a large farm, but subsequently suffered financial problems, sold the farm and returned to Melbourne. Gillies went to New Zealand in search of more gold and his wife and two children remained with friends in Melbourne. He returned eighteen months later, only to find that his wife had remarried, assuming he would not return.

Gillies sailed to North America, joined the Union Army and fought in the American Civil War, but in 1861 he deserted and joined a gold rush in California, where he mined successfully for six years. He accumulated a considerable fortune and went back to Australia to reclaim his children, then sailed with them back to St Kilda in 1871, where they were enthusiastically welcomed. However, after five weeks he and his children became dissatisfied with the remote and isolated life on Hirta and decided to emigrate to America.

== Second emigration (1871) ==
In 1871, Gillies left St Kilda with his children and sailed to North America, settling in California, where his priority was his children's future. Eleven years later, after settling his children, he returned to St Kilda, arriving in 1884. On 27 April 1885, at the age of 59, he married an island girl, Rachel MacQueen, aged 31 according to the certificate. Her silver ring was the only metal wedding ring on St Kilda; a piece of woollen thread was traditionally used.

During his stay he tried to persuade the islanders to emigrate, stirring up discontent and ill-feeling against their landlord. By October 1885 almost all the islanders were keen to relocate, either to the mainland or to Australia. However, in June 1886, Robert Connell visited the island and reported that they had changed their minds.

== Third emigration (1885) ==
Gillies and his new wife left St Kilda in 1885 and travelled to Australia, settling in Melbourne. His wife, however, was homesick and did not like the climate, so within eight months she brought him back to live in St Kilda. At this time, they lost their only child to infantile tetanus. The islanders quickly tired of his overpowering self-assurance and his attempts to make them change their ways and introduce modern methods, and they forced him to leave.

== Fourth emigration (1889) ==
Gillies and his wife took the first boat from St Kilda in summer 1889, travelling to Canada, where they settled for a while in Vancouver. Their final move, some time in the 1890s, was to Los Angeles County, California, where one of his daughters was married. A gravestone stands in Downey District Cemetery in Los Angeles County, California, inscribed "Ewen Gillies: Nov 11 1826 – May 10 1904" and "Rachel Gillies: died April 28 1905".

== Ewan and the Gold ==
Gillies' life story is the subject of Scots song-writer Brian McNeill's song Ewan and the Gold, which is featured on his 1991 album Back O' The North Wind.

== See also ==
- Highland Clearances
- Australian gold rushes
- 1853 in Australia
- 1861 in the United States
