= Haskeir =

Island in Scotland

Eilean Hasgeir (Gaelic)
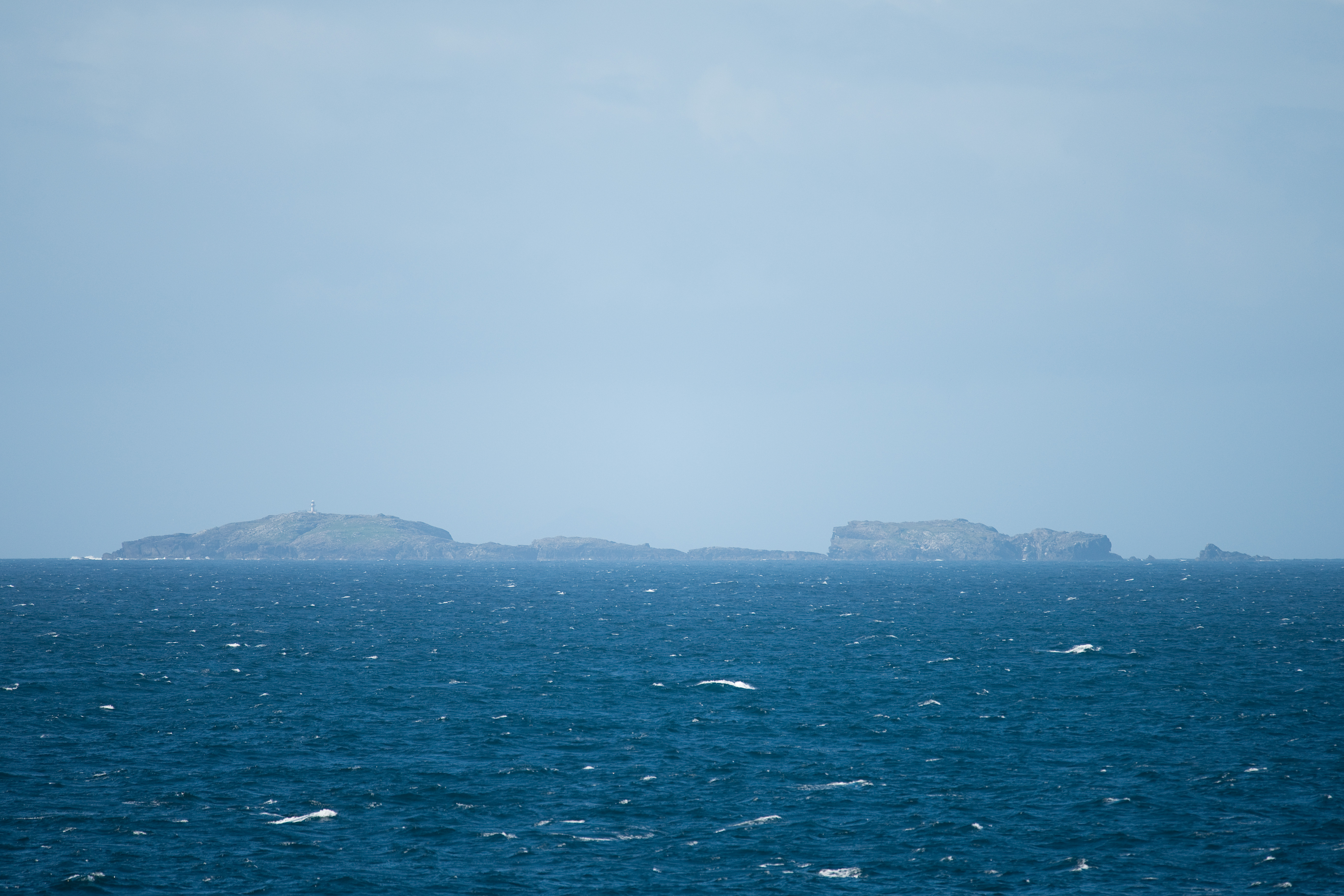
- Haskeir Island as seen from Rubha Ghriminis, North Uist

Location
- Haskeir shown within the Outer Hebrides
- OS grid reference: NF615818
- Coordinates: 57.8°N 7.8°W

Name
- Name meaning: Possibly Old Norse for "shields"
- Old Norse name: Skilðar?

Physical geography
- Island group: Uist and Barra
- Area: 15 ha (37 acres)
- Highest elevation: 37.5 m (123 ft)

Administration
- Council area: Na h-Eileanan Siar
- Country: Scotland
- Sovereign state: United Kingdom

Demographics
- Population: 0
- Haskeir Lighthouse
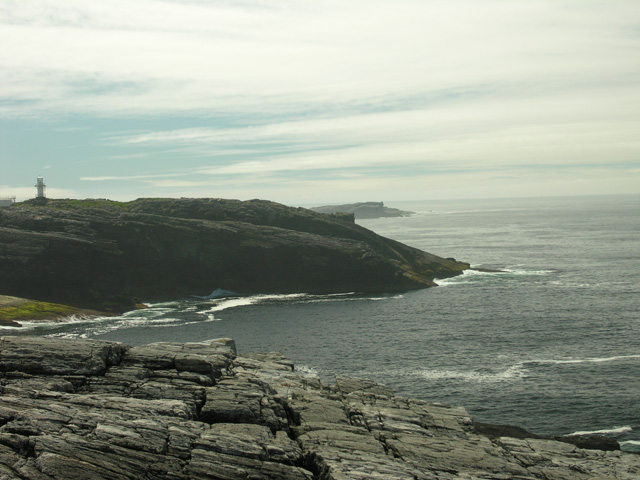
- Haskeir Lighthouse, and Haskeir Eagach in the distance
- Coordinates: 57.699084°N 7.688555°W
- Constructed: 1997
- Foundation: concrete base
- Construction: fiber glass tower
- Height: 9 m (30 ft)
- Shape: cylindrical tower with balcony and lantern
- Power source: solar power
- Operator: Northern Lighthouse Board
- Focal height: 44 m (144 ft)
- Range: 29 nmi (54 km)
- Characteristic: Fl W 20 s

Haskeir (Scottish Gaelic: Eilean Hasgeir), also known as Great Haskeir (Scottish Gaelic: Hasgeir Mhòr) is a remote, exposed and uninhabited island in the Outer Hebrides of Scotland. It lies 13 kilometres (7 nautical miles) west-northwest of North Uist. One kilometre (1/2 nautical mile) southwest lie the skerries of Haskeir Eagach, made up of a colonnade of five rock stacks, and 40 km (22 nmi) northwest is St Kilda.

== Geography, geology and botany ==
There is no anchorage or shelter and access via the steep rocky cliffs may be difficult, even in calm conditions. There are several natural rock arches and a high cliff on the northern end of the island called Castle Cliff. Various small skerries lie immediately to the north and south. There is very little vegetation save for a few sea-pinks, campion, plantain and orache that can survive the salt spray.

Much of the bedrock is Lewisian gneiss

== History ==
Skilðar or Skilðir (meaning 'shields') may have been the Old Norse name for Haskeir. Skildar certainly appears on a map by Nicholas de Nicolay from 1583. There are various theories that somehow the transposition of this name to nearby St Kilda may have created the name for this latter archipelago, whose origins are otherwise obscure.

There is an active lighthouse on the island constructed in 1997 and operated by the Northern Lighthouse Board, as well as the remains of a bothy, possibly built by fishermen from the Monach Islands.

== Gallery ==
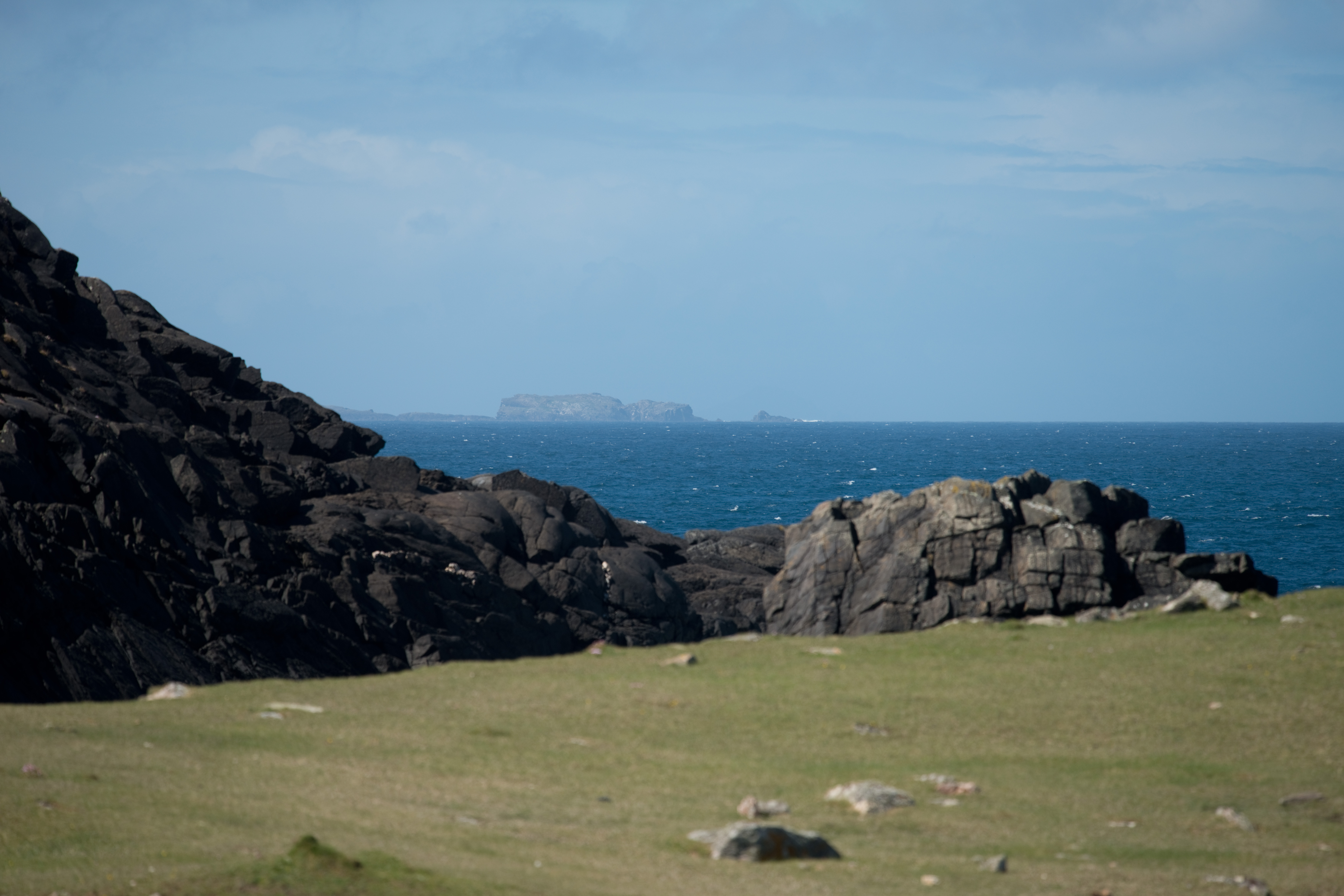
North east of Haskeir from Griminish, North Uist

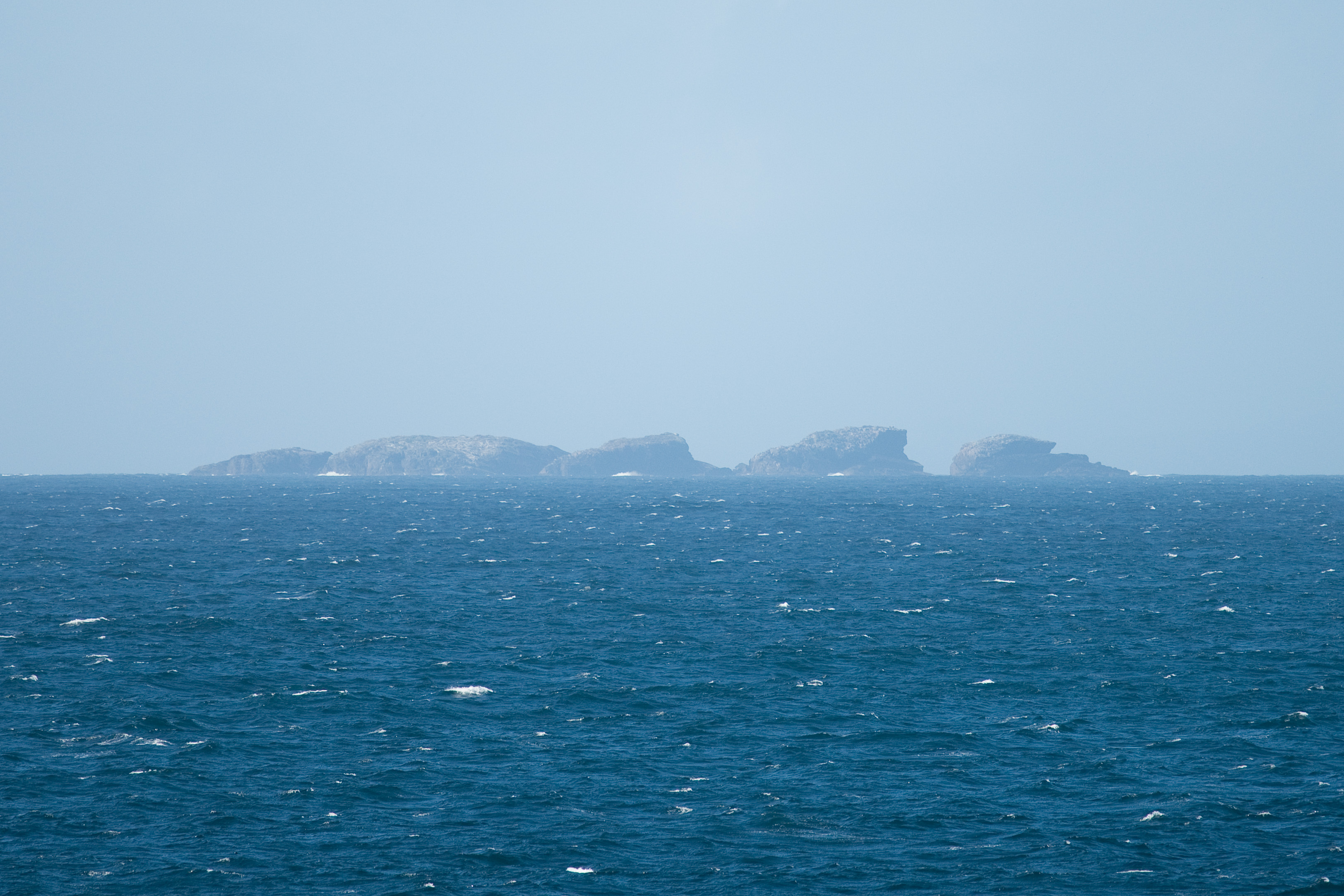
Heisgeir Eagach from Rubha Ghriminis, North Uist

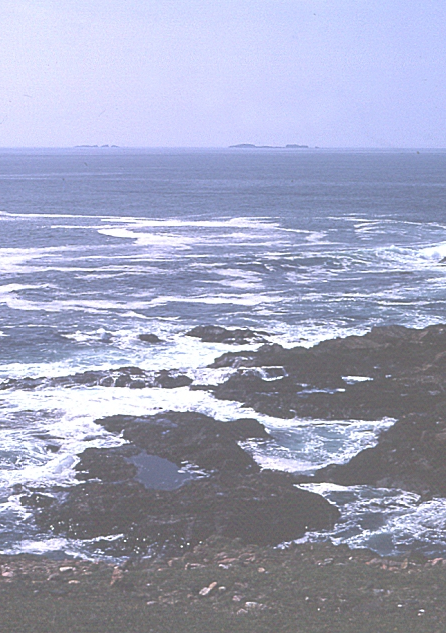
Haskeir (on the right) and Haskeir Eagach from Griminish Point, North Uist

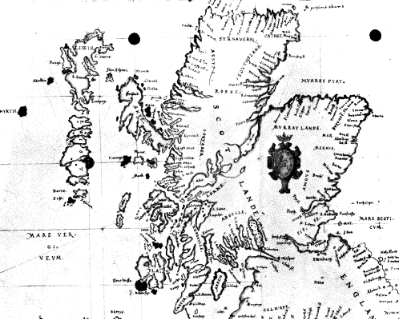
1580 Carte of Scotlande showing Hyrth (i.e. Hirta in St Kilda) at left and Skaldar (Haskeir) to the north west

== See also ==
- List of islands in Scotland
- List of lighthouses in Scotland
- List of Northern Lighthouse Board lighthouses
