= Haskeir Eagach =

Island group in the Outer Hebrides, Scotland

Hesgeir Eagach (Gaelic)
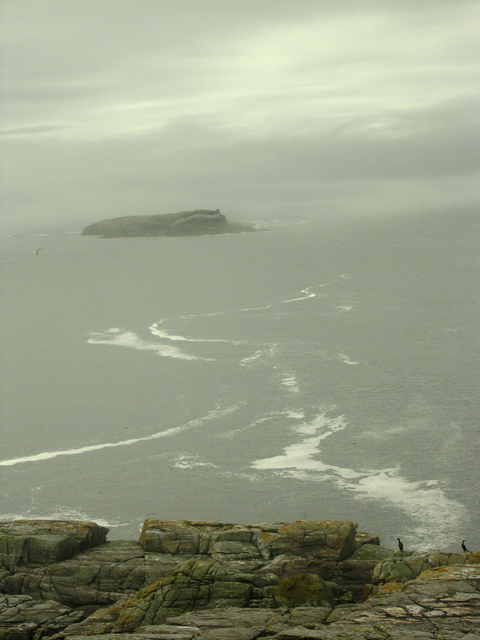
- Haskeir Eagach from Haskeir Lighthouse

Location
- Location within Outer Hebrides
- OS grid reference: NF 59699 81000
- Coordinates: 57.7°N 7.7°W

Physical geography
- Island group: Uist and Barra

Administration
- Council area: Na h-Eileanan Siar
- Country: Scotland
- Sovereign state: United Kingdom

Demographics
- Population: 0

Haskeir Eagach is an uninhabited group of skerries, located two kilometres (1 1/4 miles) southwest of Haskeir in the Outer Hebrides, Scotland.

== See also ==
- List of islands in Scotland
