= Kenneth Macaulay (minister) =

Scottish church minister and local historian

Kenneth Macaulay (1723 – 2 March 1779) was a Scottish church minister, and writer of a history of St Kilda, Scotland.

== Life ==
Macauly was the third son of Aulay Macaulay (1673–1758), minister of Harris, Outer Hebrides, and his wife Margaret Morison. He was educated at King's College, Aberdeen, where he graduated M.A. in 1742. In 1749 he was appointed missionary to Lochaber, but declined it, and in November 1751 he was ordained as assistant and successor to his father, whom he succeeded as sole pastor in 1758. In 1761 he was presented by Archibald, duke of Argyll, to the parish of Ardnamurchan, Argyllshire, and was admitted there in July. In October 1772 he was translated to Braaven, now known as Cawdor.

He married in 1758 Penelope Macleod, and they had five children. Neil, the eldest, became a missionary minister in Harris. Macaulay died on 2 March 1779, in his fifty-sixth year, survived by his wife.

== The History of St Kilda ==
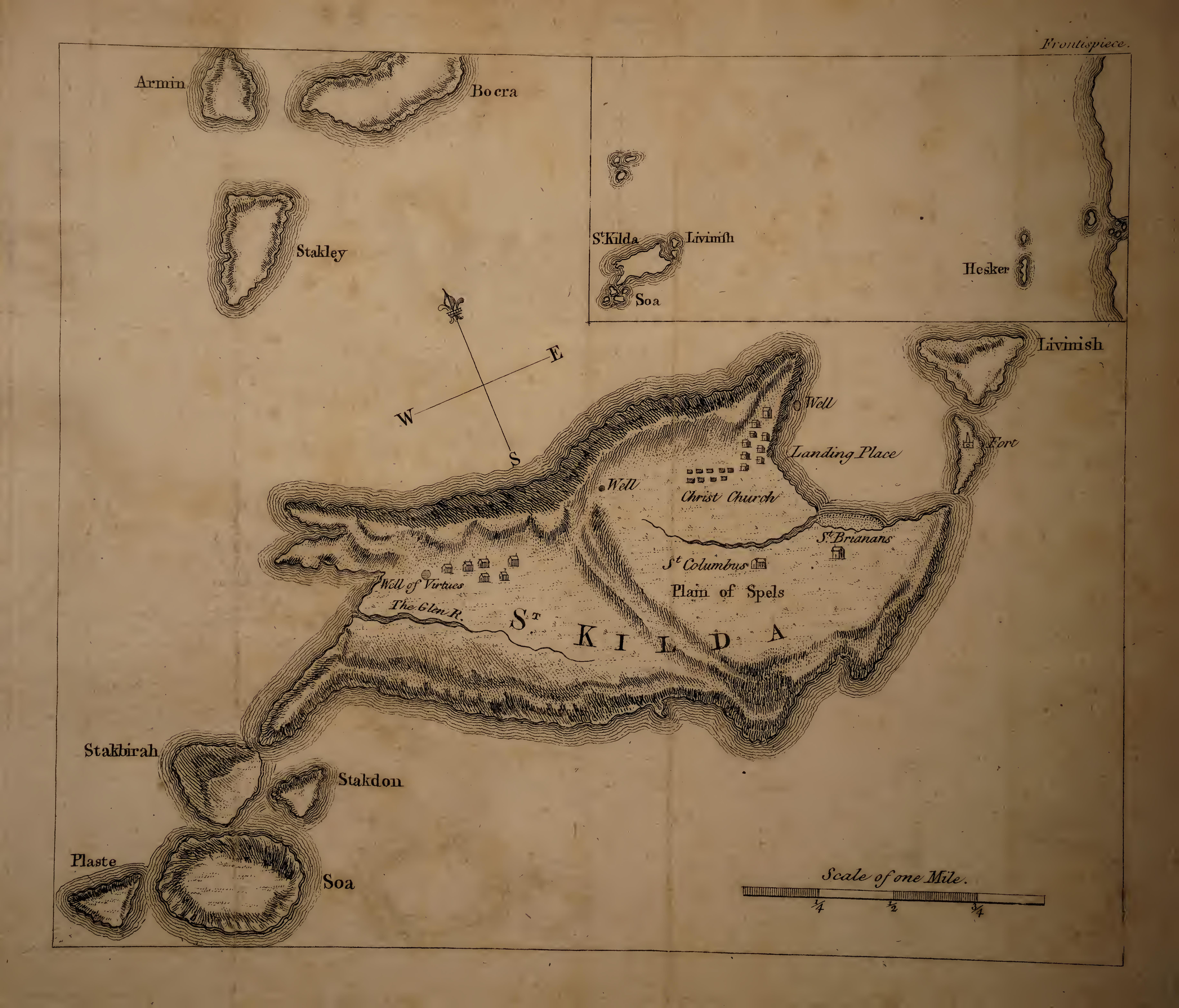
Map of St Kilda, from The History of St Kilda

Macaulay visited St Kilda in 1759, on behalf of the Society in Scotland for Propagating Christian Knowledge (SSPCK), and published in 1764 The History of St Kilda, containing a Description of this Remarkable Island, the Manners and Customs of its Inhabitants, the Religious and Pagan Antiquities there found, with many other curious and interesting particulars. The volume was shown to Samuel Johnson by James Boswell prior to his visit to the Hebrides in 1773. Johnson pronounced it "very well written, except some foppery about liberty and slavery". With Boswell he visited Macaulay on his journey to the Hebrides, and from conversation with him came to the conclusion that he could not have written the book. "There is," he said, "a combination in it of which Macaulay is not capable." Johnson may have been partly influenced in his opinion by a discussion he had on the English clergy with Macaulay, who was by no means respectful towards episcopal claims. Johnson pronounced him a "bigot to laxness". Boswell was told that the book had been written by John Macpherson of Skye from materials supplied by Macaulay. It is now generally accepted that the book is mostly Macaulay's own work, with some parts contributed by Macpherson.
