= Points (coat color) =

Coloration of animal coat/fur

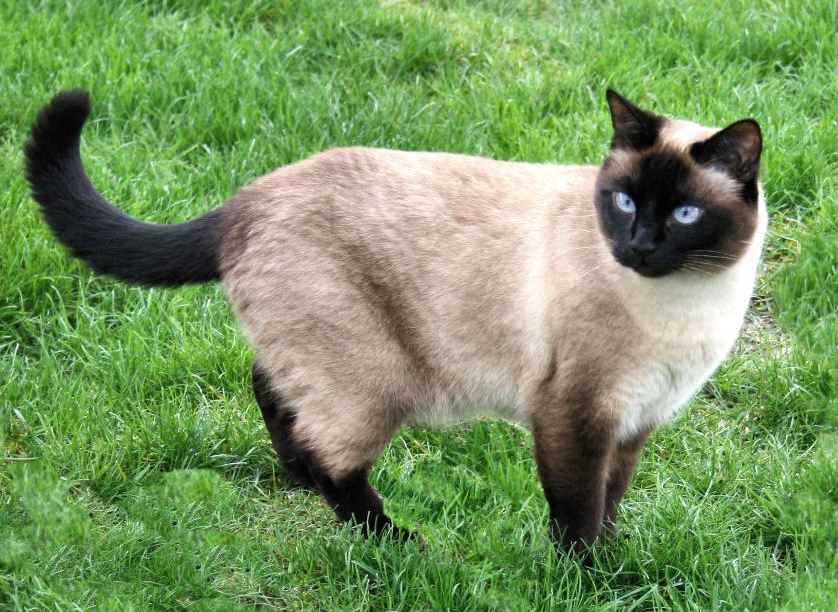
A cat with black point coloration

Points are specific areas of an animal coat that are colored differently from the main body colorations. Point coloration may be represented by a pale body color and relatively darker extremities, such as face, ears, feet, tail, and external sex organs, as seen on Siamese cats. However, colored points can be found in many mammal species and some points are lighter than the main body color.

== Temperature-dependent colorpoint ==
In many species, colorpoint patterns come from a genetic mechanism causing pigment to be produced only in cooler areas of the body, called acromelanism. This can be seen in cats, dogs (rare), fancy rats, guinea pigs, and rabbits.

Temperature-dependent colorpoint

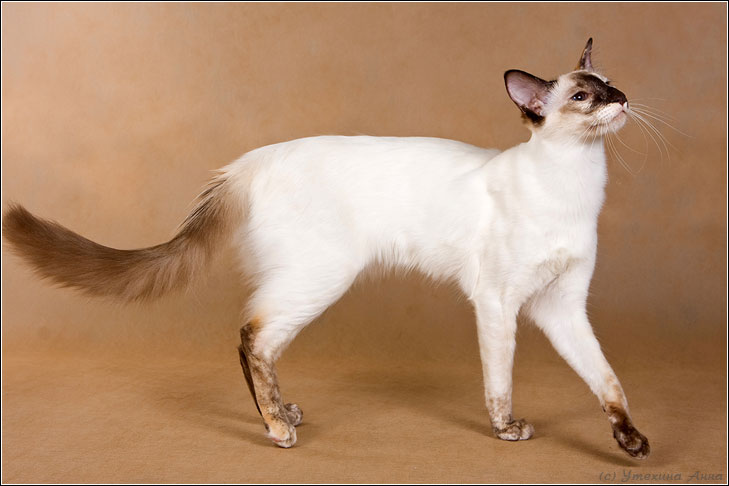
Cat

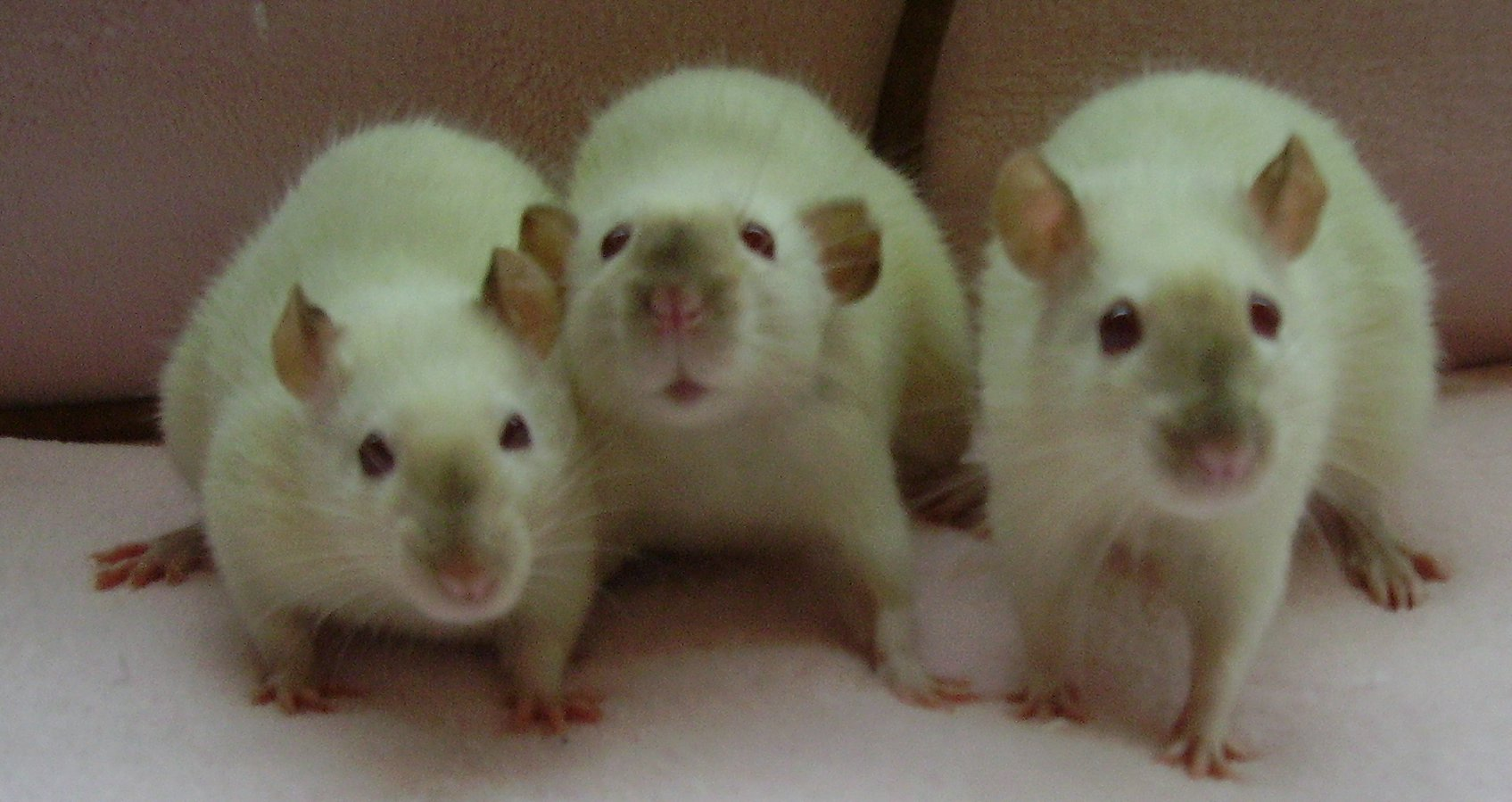
Fancy rat

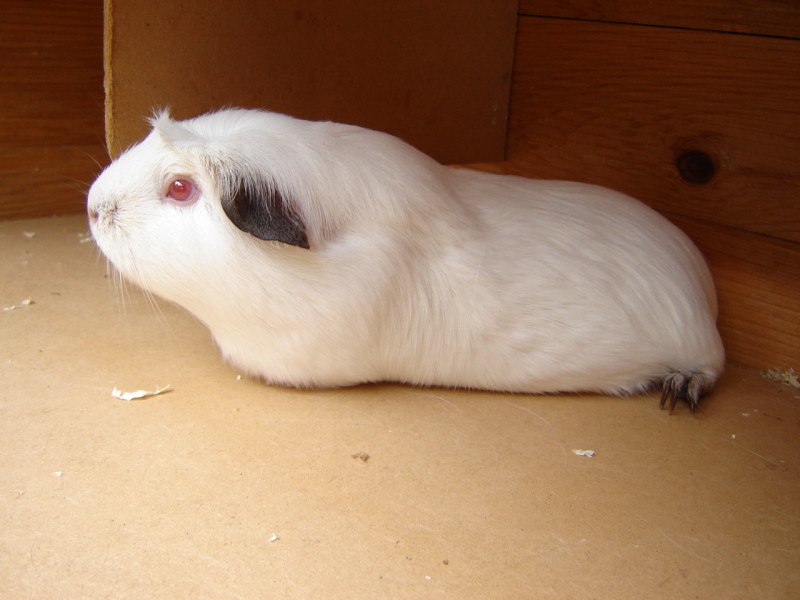
Guinea pig

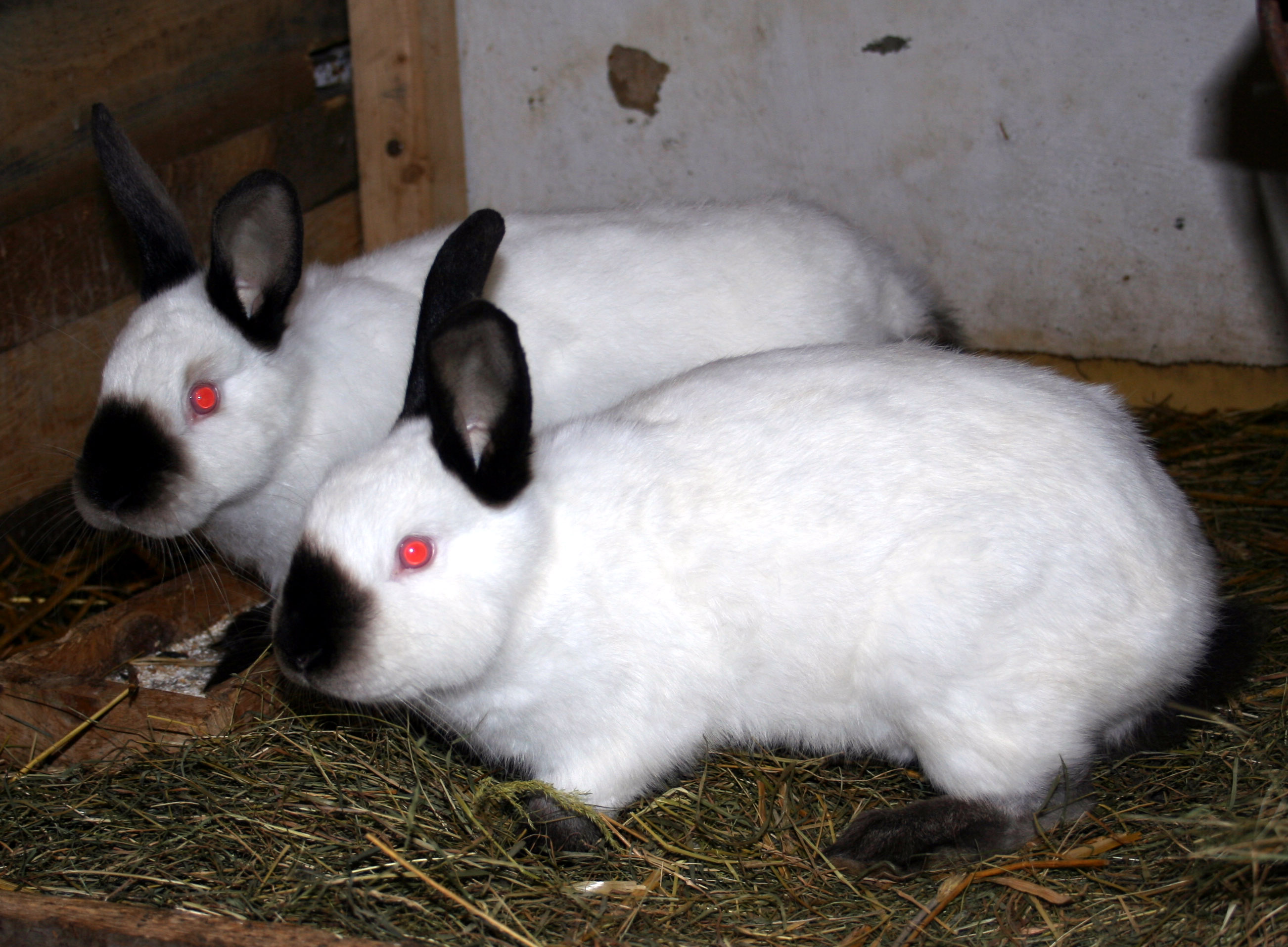
Rabbit

== Dogs ==
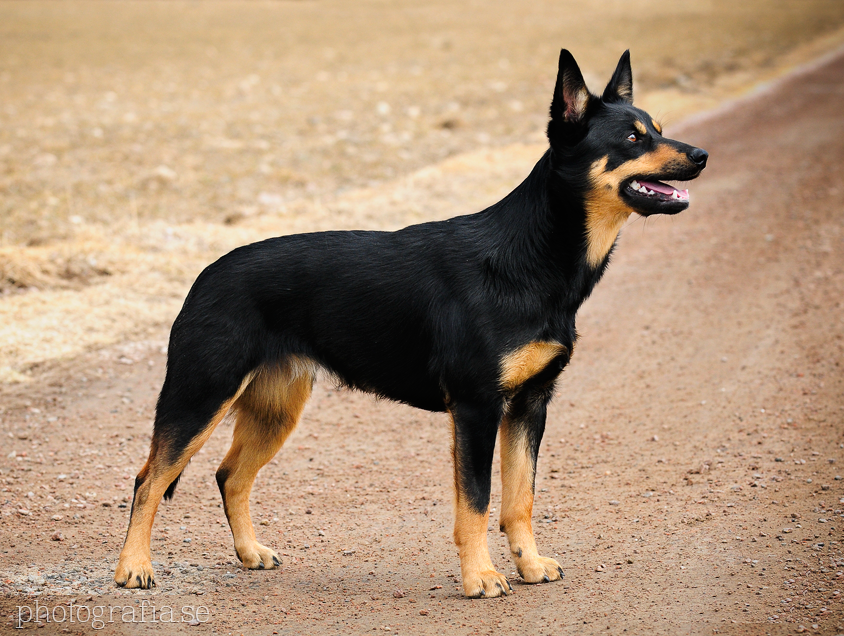
Dog with tan points

Colored points in dogs are lighter than the body coat, and usually tan. Tan points include small patches above the eyes and on the cheeks, the sides of the muzzle, front of neck and chest, lower legs and insides of legs, and under the tail.

== Horses ==
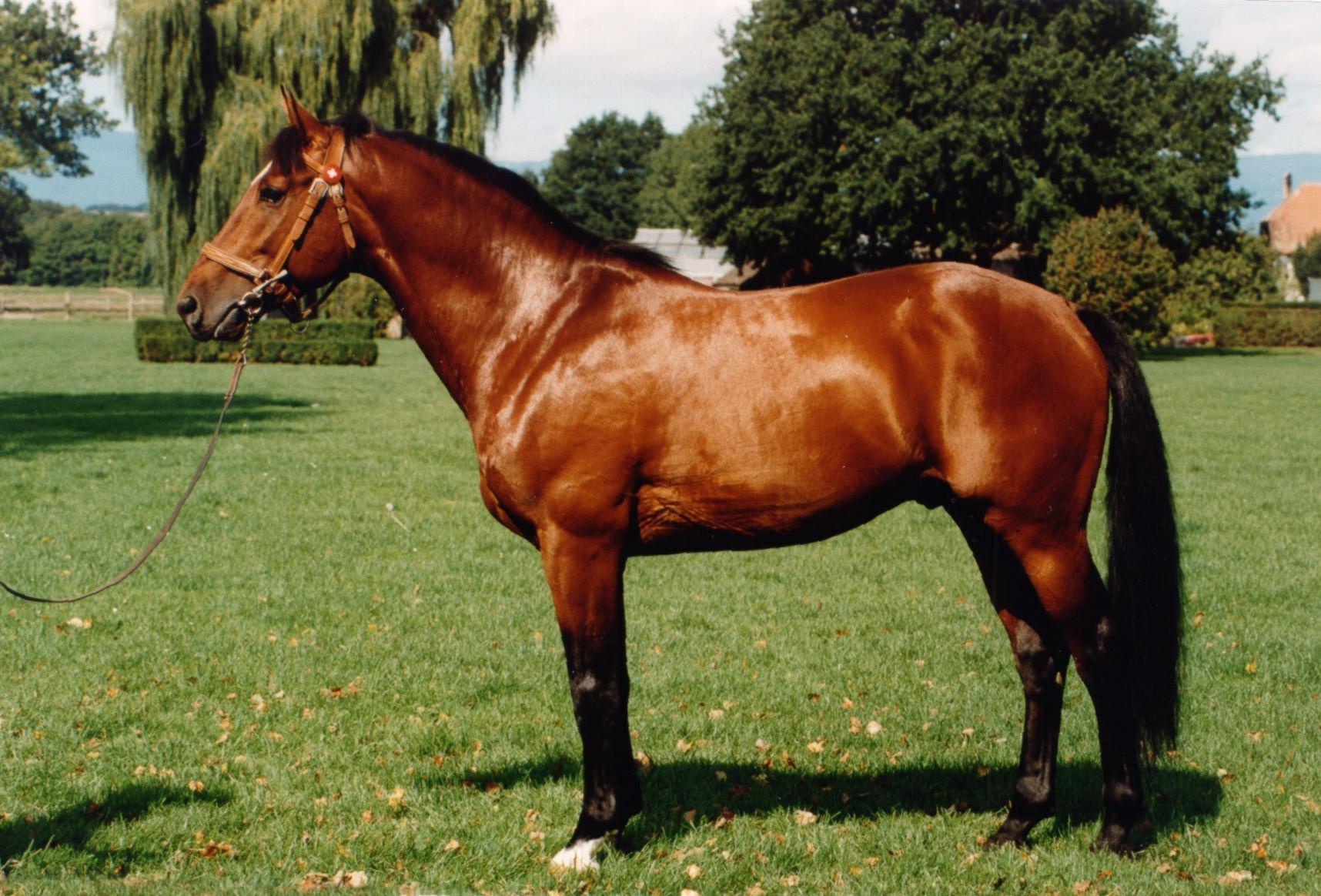
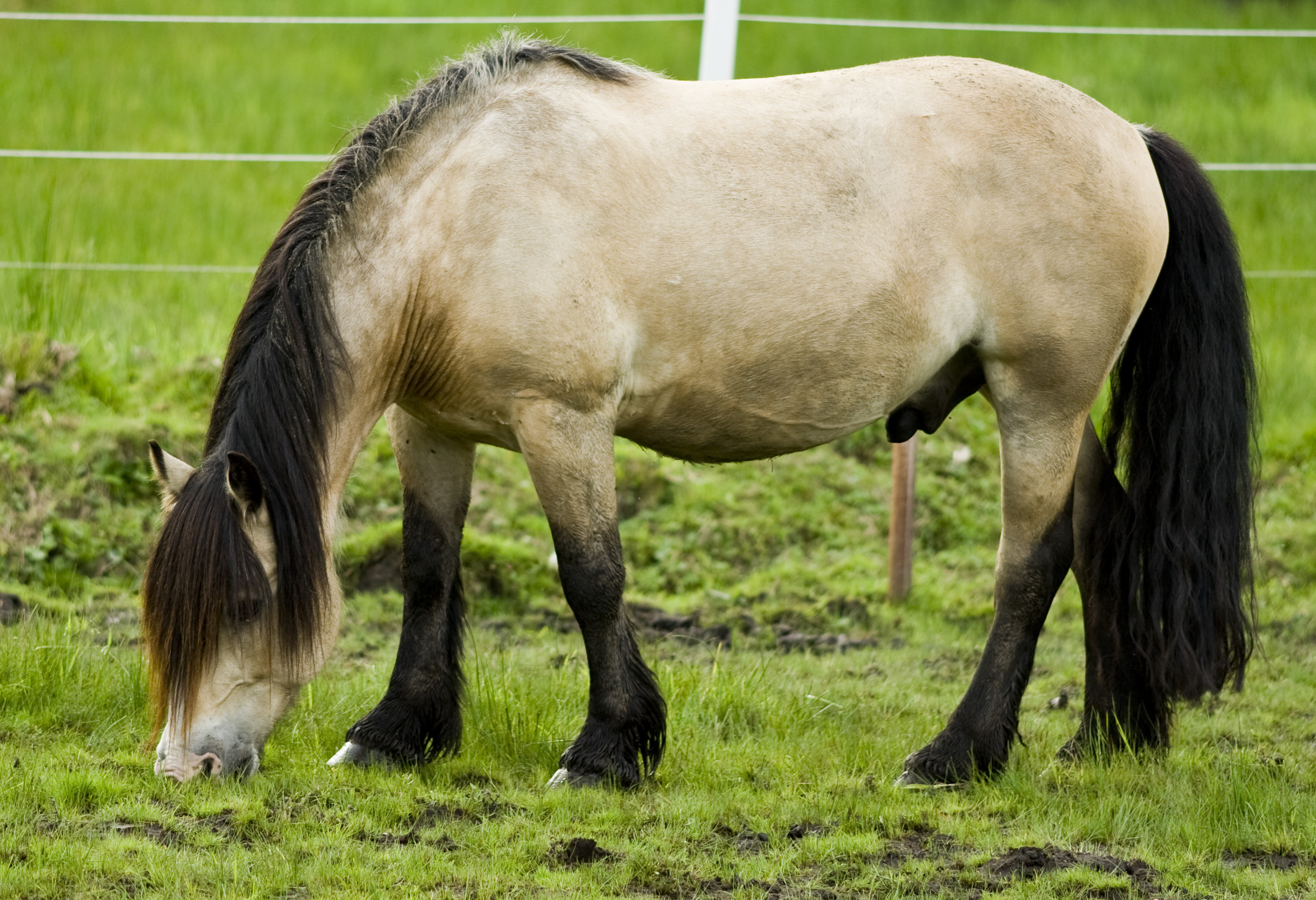
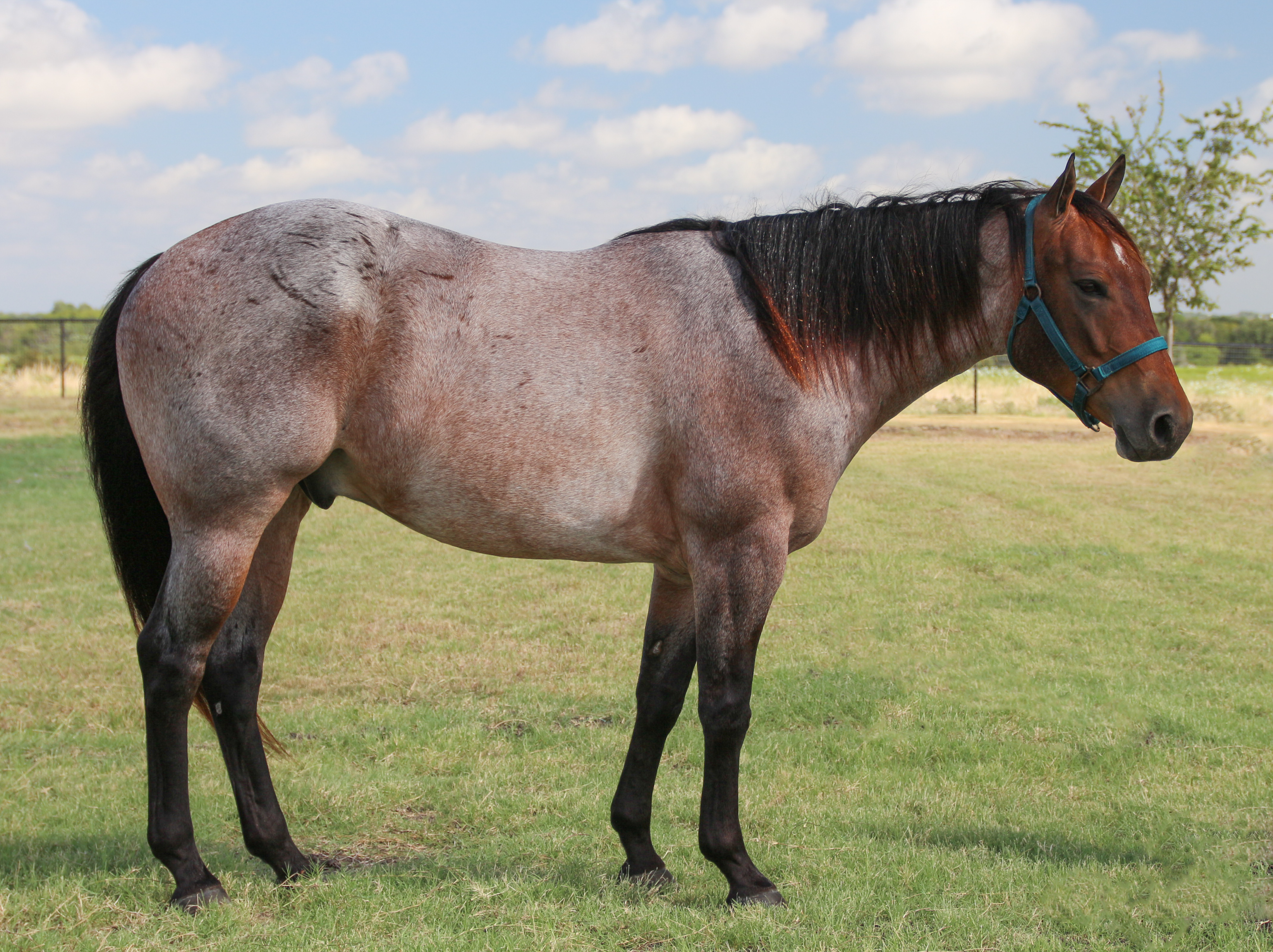
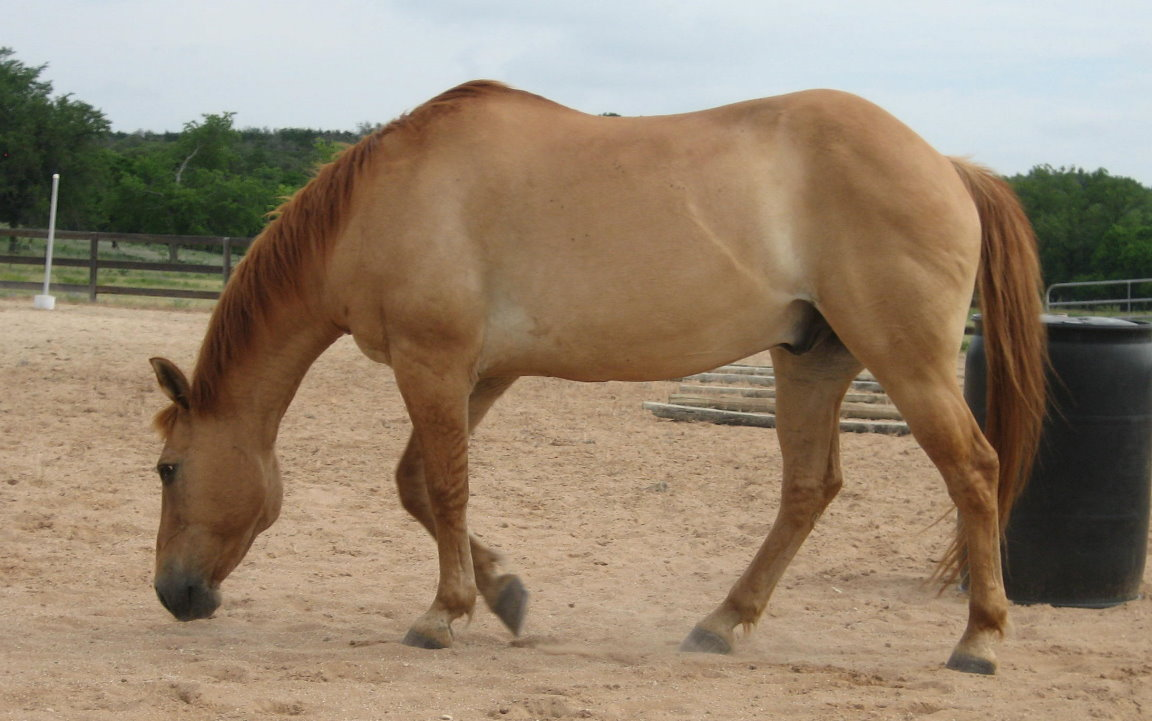
Some horse colors showing points: Bay, buckskin, roan, red dun

When referring to horse colors, the points are the mane, tail, lower legs, and ear rims. Certain combinations of point color and body color determine most horse color names. For example, a bay horse has a reddish-brown body color with black points, and a buckskin is a yellowish horse with black points. Some horse colorations have nonblack points (cream, red or brown), such as the red dun which has red to brown points.

In a color with points (black or nonblack) the legs are dark and the color goes all the way down to the hoof, whereas in a horse color without points the color just above the hoof is lighter than its body color. Roan horses have white hairs interspersed throughout their body color, but the points are unaffected and remain black, however a horse with high white leg markings might have their points obscured.

== Livestock ==
Some breeds of sheep exhibit point coloration with a white fleece and colored head and legs, usually black. Sheep breeds with black points include: Clun Forest, Dorset Down, Hampshire Down, Norfolk Horn, Oxford Down, Shropshire, Suffolk, and Valais Blacknose. Instead of black, American Tunis sheep have a red face, and Wensleydale sheep have a blue-grey face.

In cattle, extreme color-sidedness creates a colorpoint pattern with a white body and darker ears, nose, and feet. Breeds displaying this pattern include the White Park, British White and some Irish Moiled.

Points in pigs are usually referred to in the color scheme "six white points" where the pig coat color is black and there is white on the four feet, the head, and the end of the tail. Pig breeds with six white points include the Berkshire pig and Poland China.

In donkeys, the term "points" refers to the muzzle, rings around the eyes, belly, and upper inner legs, which are usually light in color. The mane, tail, and ear rims are referred to as "trim" and roughly correspond to the "points" of horses. Most donkeys have light points. The coat colors without light points may be called "no light points", "dark points", or "black points". Dark points are caused by a recessive allele of agouti found in Normand and Miniature donkeys. The light areas may vary in extent, with some donkeys having a dark nose but with light areas on the insides of the legs.

Livestock points

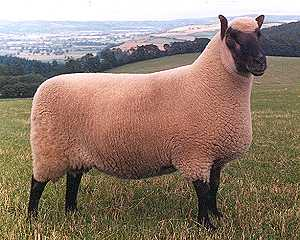
A sheep showing dark points on its face, ears, and legs

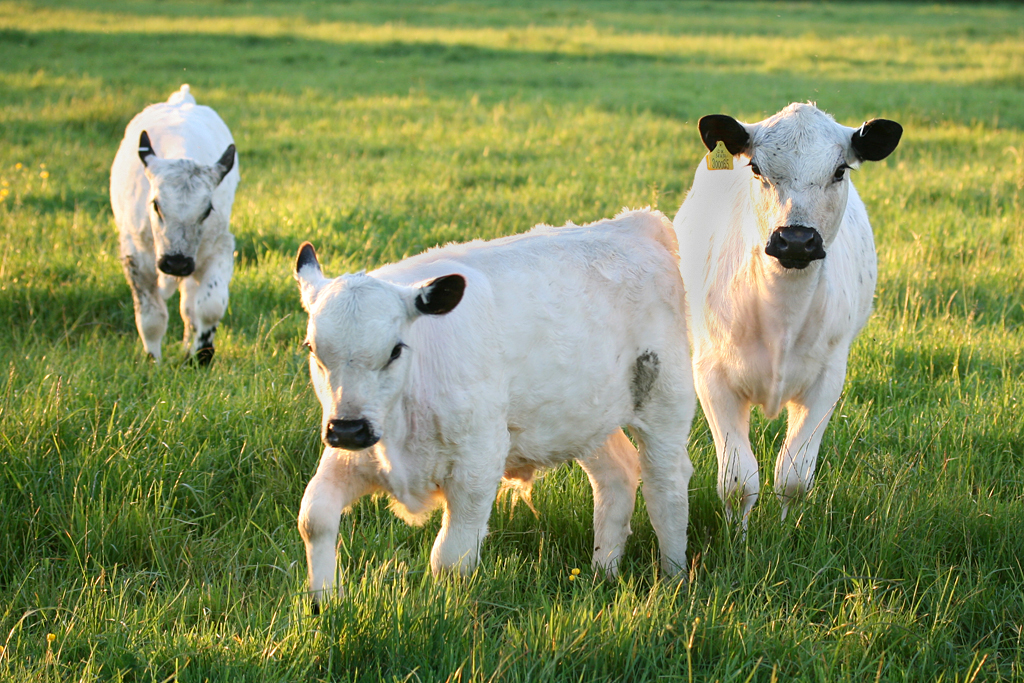
British White calves

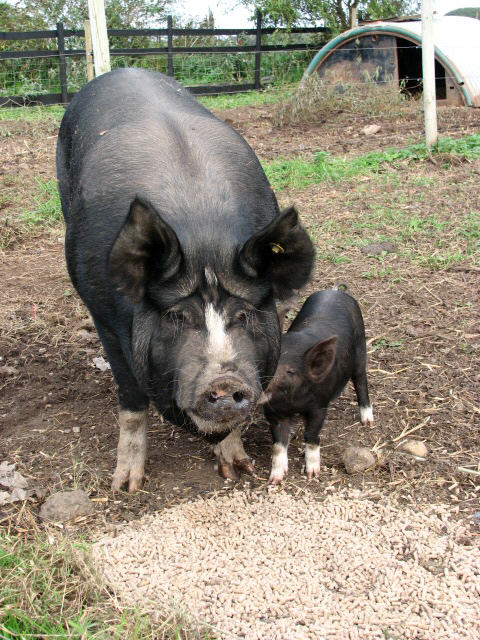
Berkshire pigs showing white points

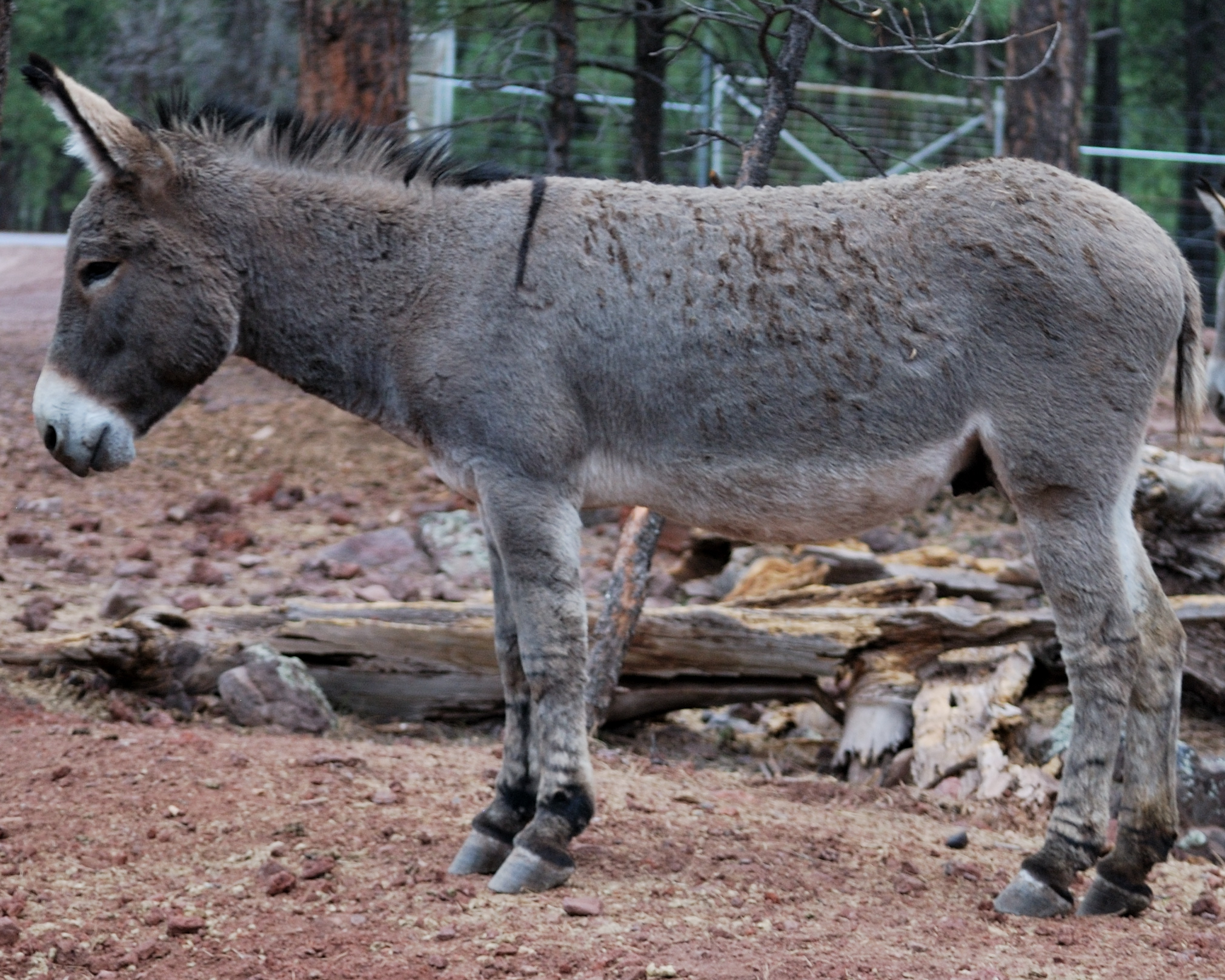
A donkey with typical light points

== See also ==
- Cat coat genetics
- Dog coat genetics
