= Latvian Black-headed sheep =

Latvian sheep

The Latvian Black-headed Sheep or dark-headed sheep is a breed of domestic sheep found throughout Latvia. The breed originated between 1927 and 1937 by importing Oxford Down and Shropshire sheep from England and crossing them with indigenous coarse-woolled sheep.
