= Southdown sheep =

British breed of sheep

Southdown
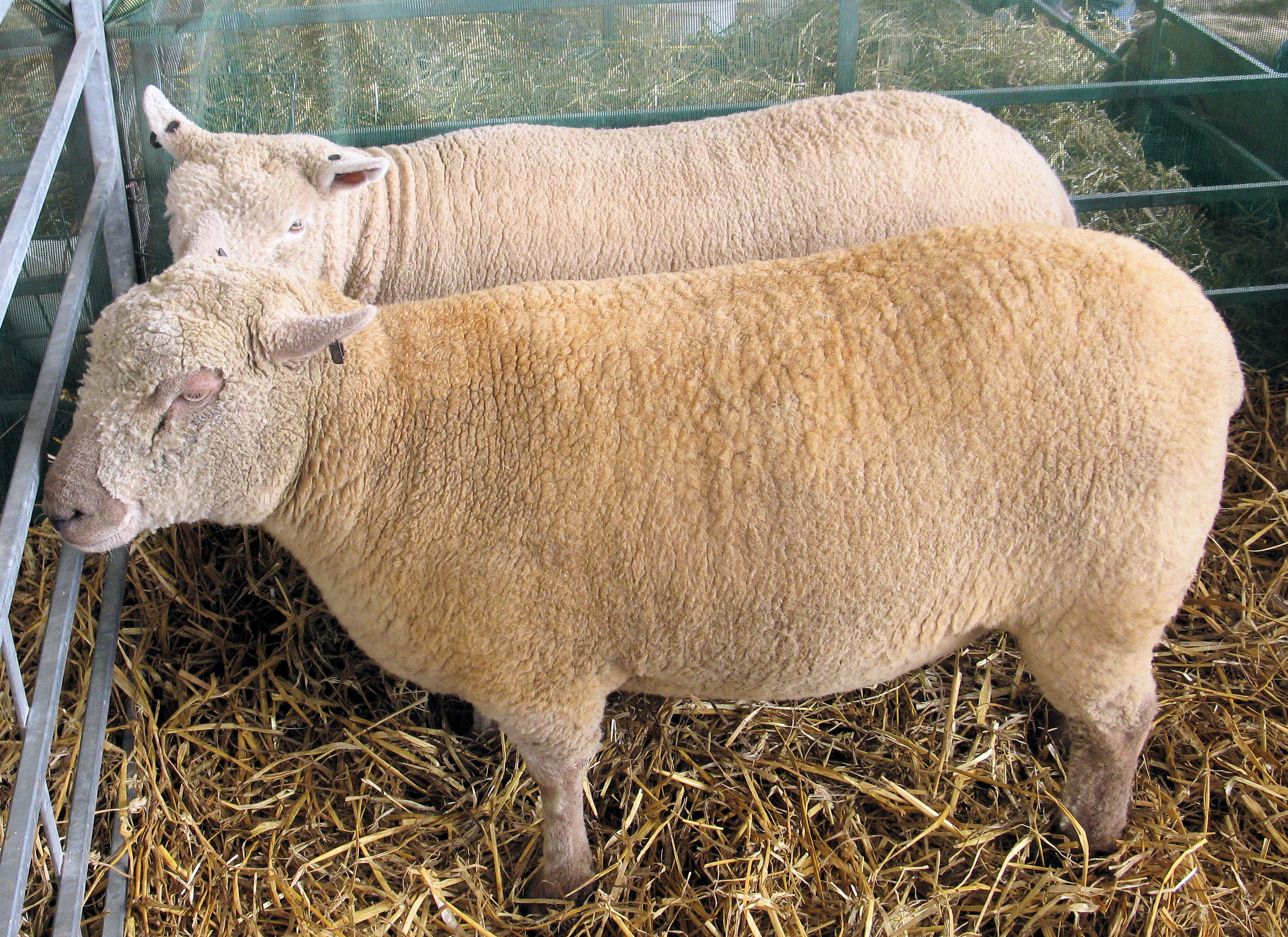
- At the Great Yorkshire Show in 2011
- Conservation status: FAO (2007): not at risk; DAD-IS (2021): at risk; RBST (2021): not at risk
- Other names: South Down
- Country of origin: United Kingdom
- Distribution: international
- Standard: Southdown Sheep Society

Traits
- Weight: Male: 78–90 kg; Female: 59–68 kg
- Height: Male: 67 cm; Female: 60 cm
- Wool colour: white
- Face colour: formerly mouse-grey, now white
- Horn status: polled

The Southdown is a British breed of small domestic sheep. It is a shortwool breed, and the basis of the whole Down group of breeds. It was originally bred by John Ellman of Glynde, near Lewes in East Sussex, in about 1800. It has been exported to many countries; it has been of particular importance in New Zealand, where it was used in the production of Canterbury lamb. In the twenty-first century it is kept principally as a terminal sire.

It is listed by the Rare Breeds Survival Trust among the UK native breeds; it was formerly listed as "priority" or "at risk".

== History ==
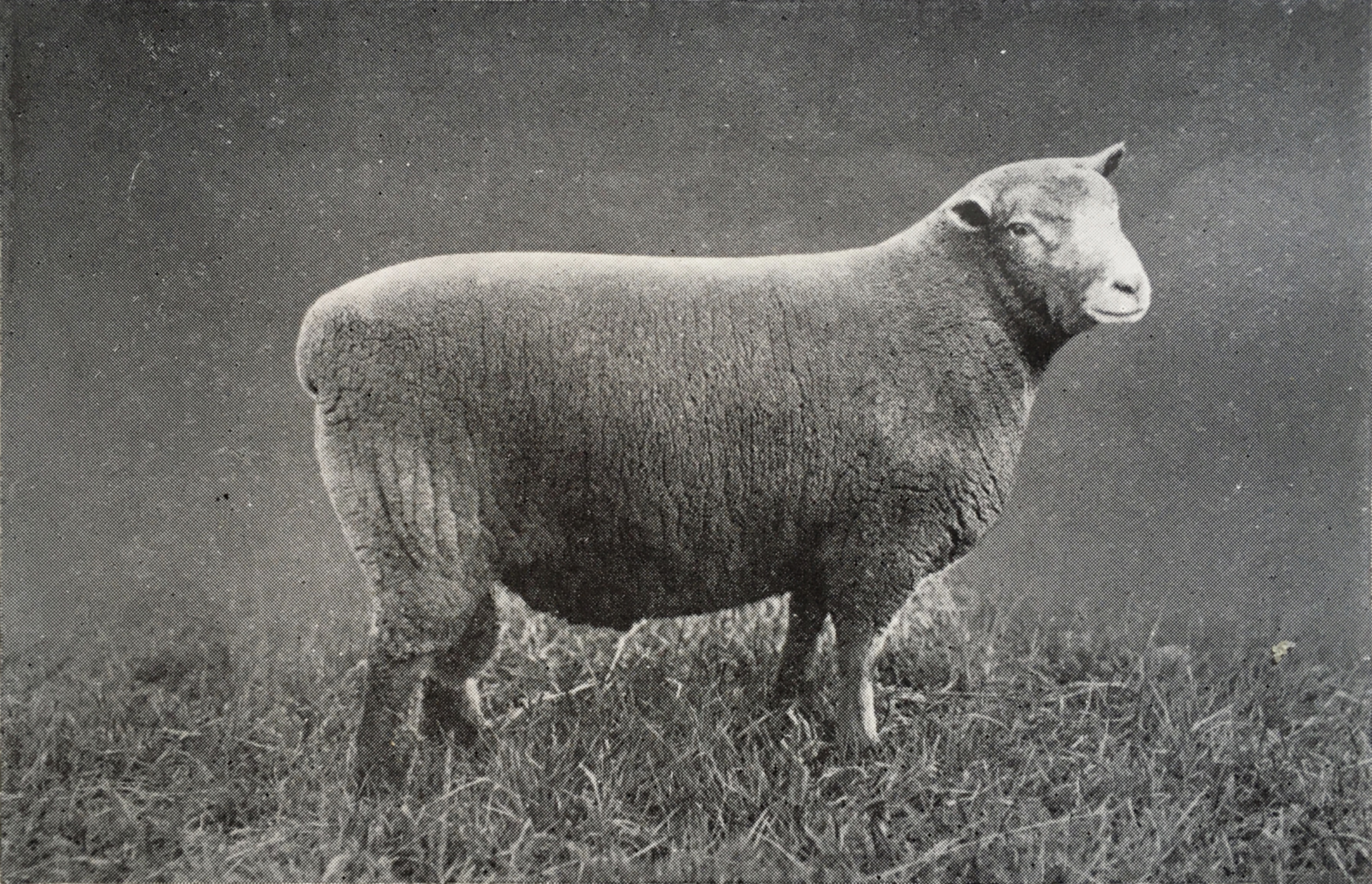
Southdown ram, photograph by Frank Babbage, from the Encyclopædia Britannica, eleventh edition, 1911

From Mediaeval times, small grey-faced polled sheep were kept on the chalk uplands of the South Downs of the counties of Kent and Sussex in south-east England. From about 1780 John Ellman, of Glynde, near Lewes in East Sussex, began selectively breeding them to improve their productive qualities; there are no records of how this breeding was carried out. By the end of the century the breed had become well known, its reputation rivalling that of the Dishley Leicester bred by Robert Bakewell. In the nineteenth century further selective breeding was carried out by Jonas Webb, of Babraham in Cambridgeshire, with such success that the breed was at times known as the Cambridgeshire.

The Southdown has contributed to the development of several other breeds, among them the other Down breeds:

- the Dorset Down, with local polled sheep and Hampshire Down, in south-west England in the later nineteenth century
- the Hampshire Down, with Berkshire Nott and Wiltshire Horn, in Berkshire in the 1830s
- the Oxford Down, with Cotswold and Hampshire Down, in Oxfordshire in the first half of the nineteenth century
- the Ryeland, with local Hereford sheep, Dishley Leicester and other Down sheep, in Herefordshire in the nineteenth century
- the Shropshire, with local breeds of Shropshire and Staffordshire including the Cannock Chase, the Longmynd and the Morfe Common, in the early nineteenth century.
- the Suffolk, with Norfolk Horn, in Suffolk in the early nineteenth century; originally known as the Southdown-Norfolk.

== Characteristics ==
The Southdown is a small sheep, the smallest both of the Down breed group and of the United Kingdom. Ewes stand about 60 cm, with weights in the range 59–68 kg, rams average 67 cm in height and weigh from 78 to 90 kg; maximum weights in the USA are higher, at 81 kg and 104 kg respectively. The fleece is white; the face was formerly bare of wool and dusky grey in colour, but is now woolly and white.

== Use ==
The Southdown was traditionally reared for meat and wool. During the day the sheep pastured freely on the downs, and at night they were close-folded in the arable fields of the farmers, where they helped to increase soil fertility. In the twenty-first century it is used principally as a terminal sire, in the expectation of easy delivery of a well-conformed and fast-growing lamb. It became the principal sire used in the production of Canterbury lamb in New Zealand.

Fleece weights (greasy) are about 2–3.5 kg for ewes, 3.5–5.5 kg for rams; clean wool yield is 40–55%. Staple length is some 50–60 mm, and fibre diameter about 23–25 μm (equivalent to a Bradford count of 58/60s).

The sheep may be used for vegetation management in vineyards, where they can reach weeds on the ground but not the grapes on the vines.
