= Devon and Cornwall Longwool =

British breed of sheep

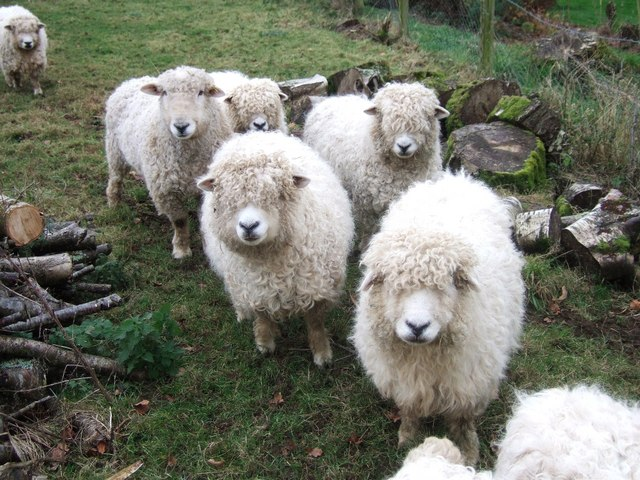
- Conservation status: FAO (2007): not at risk; DAD-IS (2024): endangered/at risk; RBST (2024–2025): at risk
- Country of origin: United Kingdom
- Distribution: south-west England
- Standard: Devon & Cornwall Longwool Flock Association
- Type: upland
- Use: wool

Traits
- Weight: Male: 115–135 kg; Female: 85–110 kg
- Height: Male: average 84 cm; Female: average 76 cm
- Wool colour: white
- Face colour: white with black nostrils
- Horn status: polled (hornless)

The Devon and Cornwall Longwool is a British breed of domestic sheep from south-west England. It was created in 1977 through merger of two local breeds, the Devon Longwool and the South Devon.

== History ==
The Devon and Cornwall Longwool was created in 1977 through merger of two long-established traditional local breeds, the Devon Longwool and the South Devon. A breed society, the Devon & Cornwall Longwool Flock Association, was formed through merger of the existing breed societies of the two constituent breeds.

In the twenty-first century it is an endangered breed. In 2023 the reported population was 546 breeding ewes and no rams, distributed in 42 herds; 252 ewes were registered in the flock book. In 2024 its conservation status was listed in DAD-IS as "at risk/endangered", while the Rare Breeds Survival Trust listed it as "at risk", its second level of concern.

== Characteristics ==
It is a large heavy sheep, somewhat stockier and shorter in the leg than some other British longwool breeds; rams usually weigh some 115–135 kg, ewes about 85–110 kg. Like the breeds from which it derives, it is polled (hornless). The wool is long and forms curls or ringlets, covering the head and legs as well as the body. The face is white, with black nostrils.

== Use ==
It is a productive provider of wool, and may give the heaviest fleece of any British breed. Fleece weight is usually in the range 7–10 kg, but weights over 20 kg have been recorded. The wool is of coarse but hard-wearing quality, with a Bradford count of 32s–36s and a staple length of about 30 cm; it is suitable for making carpets and for some industrial uses. Lambs may be shorn at about six months; the lambswool is much sought after.
