= Spider lamb syndrome =

Genetic disorder of sheep

Spider lamb syndrome, also known as spider syndrome and more formally as ovine hereditary chondrodysplasia, is a homozygous recessive disorder affecting the growth of cartilage and bone in sheep. The name derives from the limbs of afflicted animals being thin, elongated, and "spider-like".

It is a semilethal trait, which is thought to have been first observed in the 1970s, and is most common in sheep of the Suffolk and Hampshire breeds. These are both black-faced breeds of sheep; the syndrome has never been detected in white-faced breeds.

The syndrome was an economically significant issue for sheep breeders in the 1980s, but with strict testing and breeding programs it has become less common.

The mutation which causes spider lamb syndrome is found on ovine chromosome 6, and involves the inactivation of fibroblast growth factor receptor 3. It has been compared to dwarfism in beef cattle.

Afflicted animals may be visibly deformed at birth and unable to stand, or seemingly normal for the first 4 to 6 weeks of their lives.

== Symptoms ==
Symptoms have been observed on fetal lambs as early as by the completion of the second gestational trimester. Under normal production circumstances, the lambs usually do not survive past the neonatal period. For this reason, the disease is considered semi-lethal. The disease typically affects the musculo-skeletal system. The clinical signs can include: skeletal abnormalities, twisted or humped spines, facial defects, bent legs, abnormally long legs, flat ribs, and underdeveloped muscles. Due to these symptoms, lambs cannot stand to nurse.

Spider lamb syndrome is untreatable, and in almost all cases, the lambs must be euthanized.

== Causes ==
Spider lamb syndrome is caused by a mutation to the gene for fibroblast growth factor receptor 3 (FGFR3), on ovine chromosome 6. FGFR3 is in the tyrosine kinase receptor family and its function is to restrict the proliferation of cartilage at the growth plates of the long bones: regulating ossification (the conversion of cartilage into bone), limiting skeletal elongation, and thereby ensuring that the limbs are the right length.
