= Manx Ark Project =

Conservation project

Manx Ark Project is a project to provide sanctuary for rare animal breeds (sheep, cattle, pigs and goats) at a number of farm sites in the Isle of Man.

In July 2014, the Isle of Man Post Office issued a commemorative stamp set featuring artwork by Jeremy Paul that highlighted endangered traditional livestock breeds and marked both the work of the Manx Ark Project and the centenary of the Southern District Agricultural Society.
