= Hampshire Down =

British breed of sheep

Hampshire
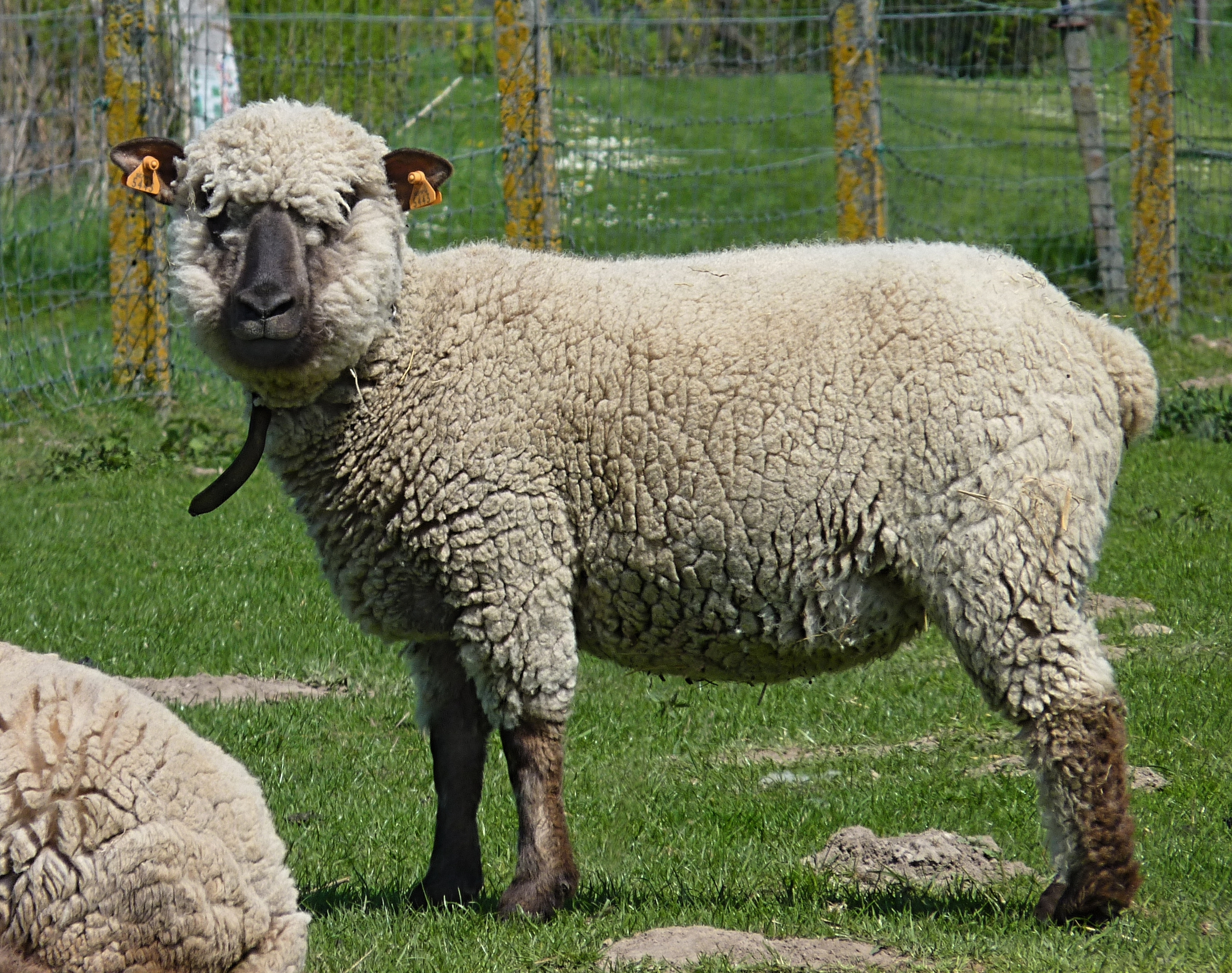
- An ewe

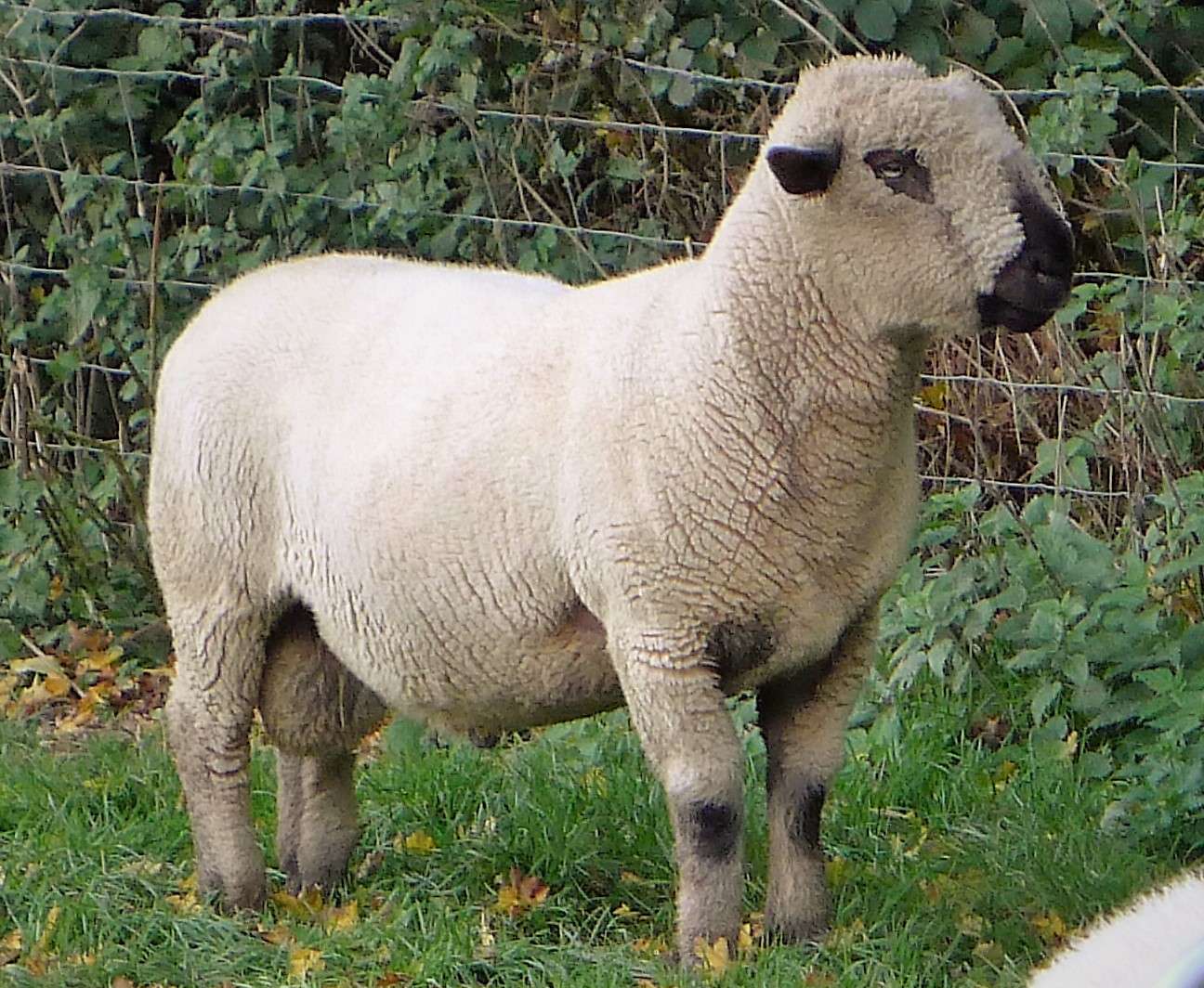
- A ram
- Conservation status: International: FAO (2007): not at risk; DAD-IS (2025): not at risk; United Kingdom: FAO (2007): not listed; DAD-IS (2025): at risk/vulnerable; RBST (2025): other native breeds
- Other names: Hampshire
- Country of origin: United Kingdom
- Distribution: 21 countries world-wide
- Standard: Hampshire Down Sheep Breeders Association

Traits
- Weight: Male: average 120 kg (260 lb); Female: average 80 kg (180 lb)
- Height: Male: average 80 cm; Female: average 70 cm
- Wool colour: white
- Horn status: polled (hornless) in both sexes

The Hampshire Down or Hampshire is a British breed of sheep. It originated in the early nineteenth century from cross-breeding of the new Southdown breed with the traditional tall, horned, white-faced sheep native to the open, untilled, chalk downland of the Hampshire Downs – the Wiltshire Horn, the Berkshire Nott and the old local Hampshire sheep. It is much used as a terminal sire.

== History ==
The Hampshire Down originated in the first half of the nineteenth century from cross-breeding of the new Southdown breed with the traditional tall, horned, white-faced sheep native to the open, untilled, chalk downland of the Hampshire Downs. From 1839 the breeder William Humphrey, of Newbury in Berkshire, used a ram from the Southdown flock of Jonas Webb, of Babraham in Cambridgeshire, on local Berkshire ewes; The resulting stock was later crossed with the Wiltshire Horn and with the old local Hampshire sheep.

The new breed received the recognition of the Royal Agricultural Society of England in either 1859 or 1861; a breed society was formed in 1890, and a flock-book was started in the same year.

In the twenty-first century it is distributed principally in Berkshire, in Hampshire and in Wiltshire, with some stock elsewhere in southern England. Its conservation status world-wide is "not at risk". In the United Kingdom, where the total population for 2024 is reported at 4430 head, its status is "at risk/vulnerable"; the Rare Breeds Survival Trust listed it on its watchlist for 2025–2026 among the "other native breeds", the lowest level of concern of the trust.

The sheep have been exported to many countries on all five inhabited continents; populations of over 10000 head are reported by Argentina and Brazil. The Hampshire Down has contributed to the development of many other breeds, among them the other Down breeds of the United Kingdom – including the Oxford Down and Dorset Down – and also the German Schwarzköpfiges Fleischschaf, the Black-Headed Polish of Poland and the Gorki of the Russian Federation.

== Characteristics ==
It is a large sheep: average weights are 80 kg for ewes and 120 kg for rams; heights at the withers are usually in the ranges 55 to 70 cm and 95 to 115 cm respectively. The fleece is thick and white, extending over the upper part of the face; the face, ears and legs are brown or black, the skin fine and unpigmented.

== Use ==
The Hampshire Down is reared principally for meat. Rams are much used as terminal sires in the three-generation cross-breeding system commonly used by commercial breeding operations.

Ewe fleeces usually weigh some 2.5–4 kg greasy, with a staple length of 60–100 mm and a fibre diameter of 25–33 μm, equivalent to a Bradford Count of 56/60s. The wool may be used to make knitting wools or in the manufacture of hosiery, felts and flannel, or for blending with wools of other types.

== Gallery ==
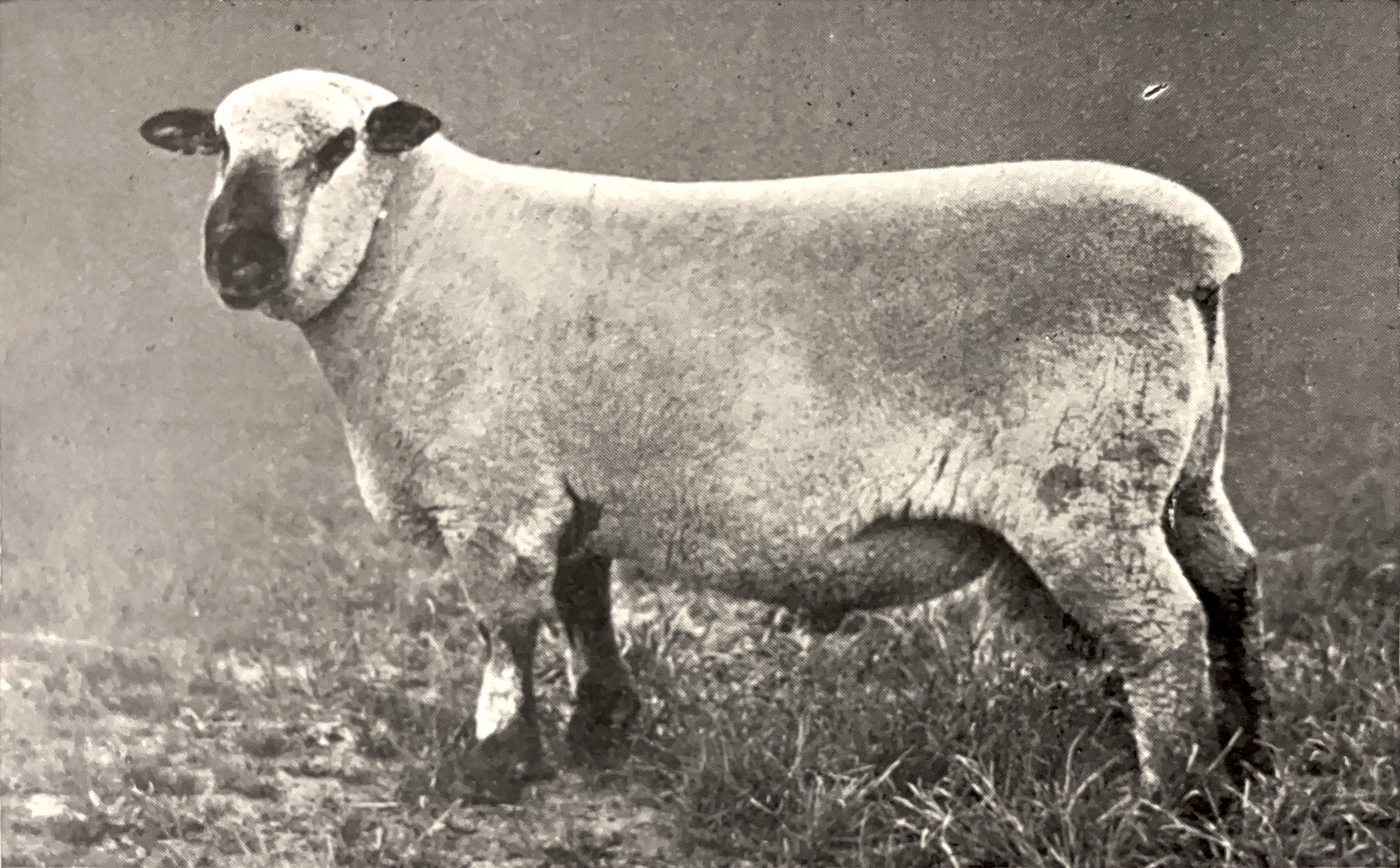
Photograph by Frank Babbage, Encyclopædia Britannica, 1911

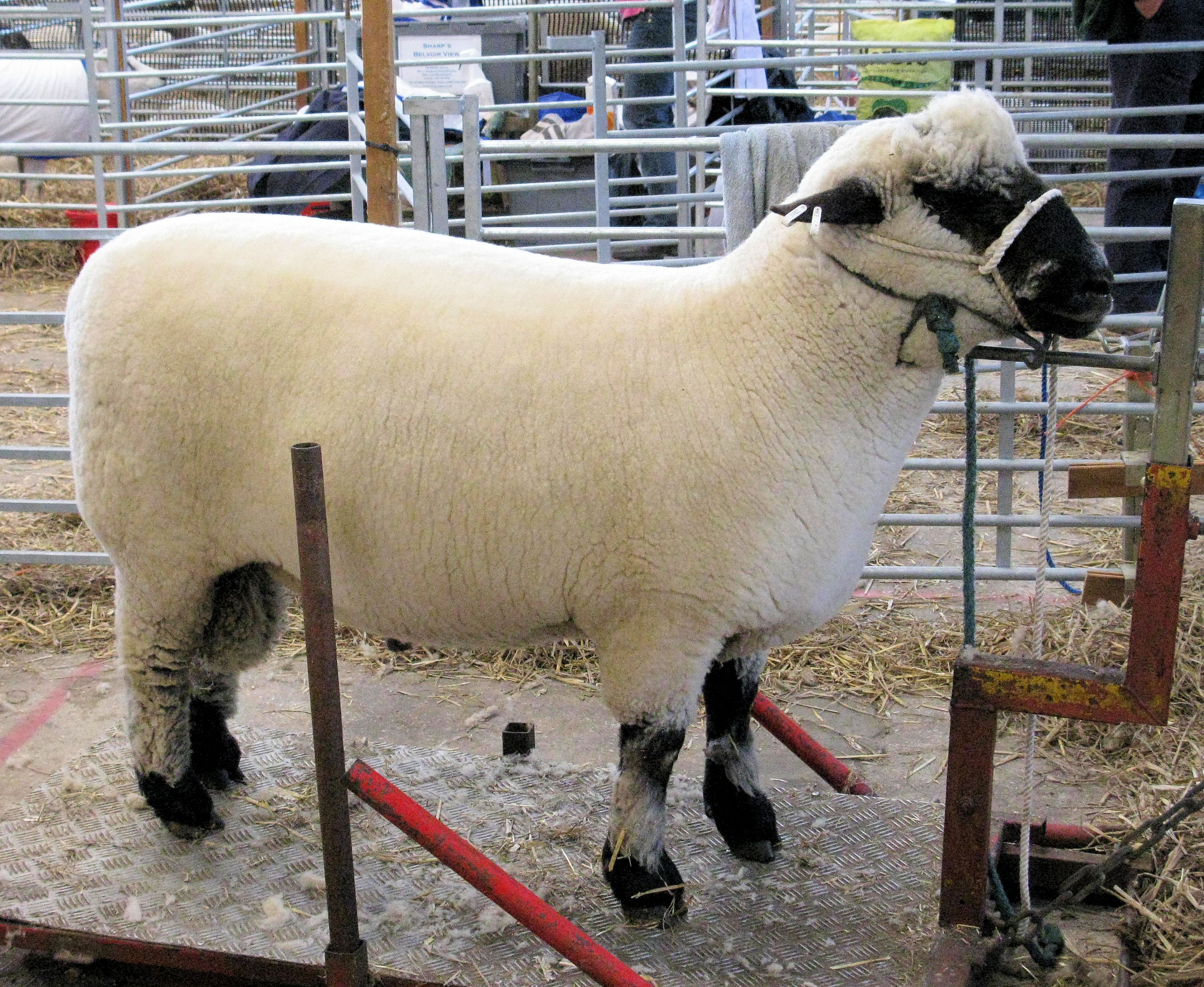
At the East of England Show, 2011

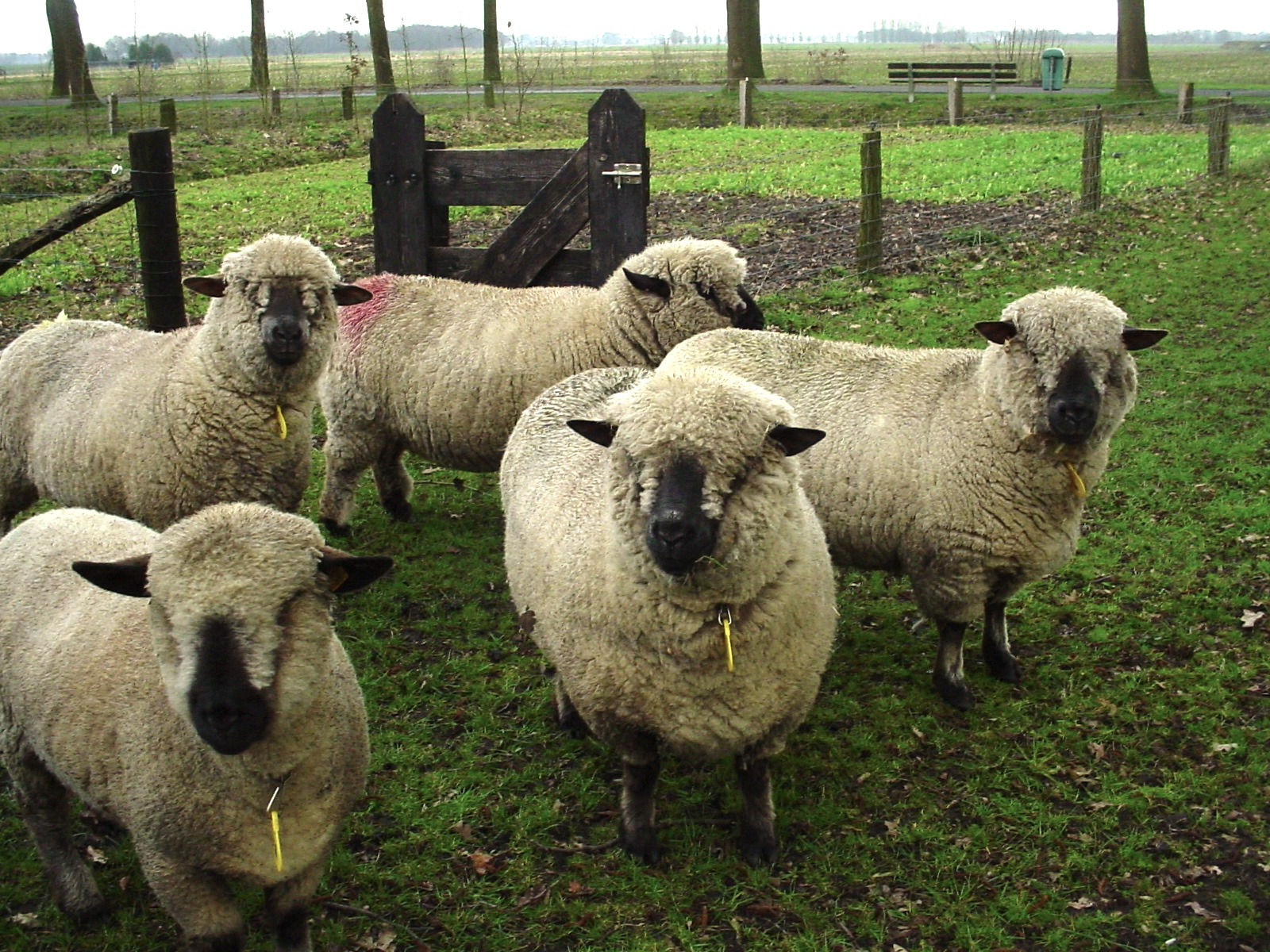
