= Norfolk Horn =

Breed of sheep

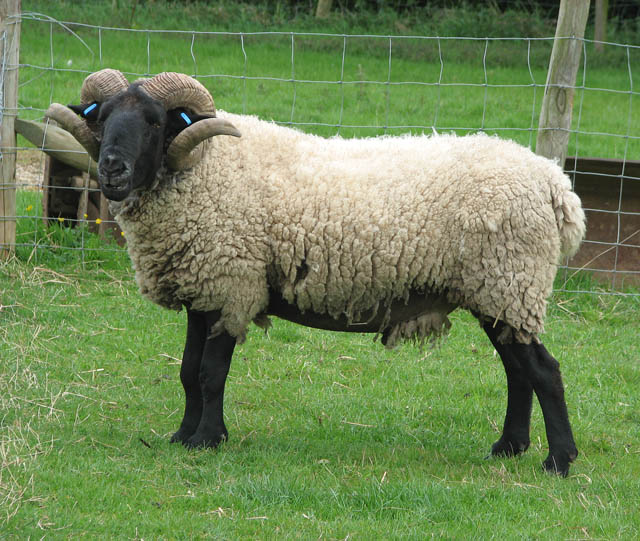
A Norfolk Horn wether

The Norfolk Horn (also known as Blackface Norfolk Horned, Norfolk Horned, Old Norfolk or Old Norfolk Horned) is one of the British black-faced sheep breeds. It differs from other black-faced breeds, which are mainly found in high-rainfall, upland areas, and from most other modern, lowland British sheep breeds in being lightly built and very hardy. This breed is raised primarily for meat.

The Norfolk Horn developed on the sandy heathlands of the Breckland area of Norfolk, England, and is adapted to surviving on poor forage in cool but dry environments. Similar black-faced sheep were formerly more widespread in lowland Britain. The breed is long-legged with black faces and legs. Both sexes have horns, although these are larger in the males. At maturity, a ewe weighs about 70 kg (150 lb). The breed is described as "flighty" and is likened to goats in their ability to jump over obstacles such as fencing.

It was a popular breed in Norfolk until the middle 19th century, when "improved" breeds such as the Leicester and Southdown were developed. After Norfolk Horn ewes were mated to Southdown rams to produce high quality, meat-producing lambs. This cross became established as a separate breed, the Suffolk.

The number of the Norfolk Horn breed fell to one flock in 1919, but it was built up and survived due to the efforts of one man, J. D. Sayer. After building up the flock, Sayer divided it and gave half to the Cambridge animal research university. There were only 10 registered ewes and two rams. By 1950, though, there were also unregistered stock. The breed was revived also through the efforts of the Rare Breeds Survival Trust (RBST) at the National Agricultural Centre, Stoneleigh and at Aldenham Country Park, Hertfordshire.

Given the shortage of pure-bred fertile rams (the last pure-bred ram died in 1973), a related breed, the Suffolk, as well as unrelated breeds such as the Wiltshire Horn and Swaledale, were used to breed animals that were more than 90% (15/16ths) Norfolk Horn. In 1986, the breed was recognised by the RBST, appearing on their Priority List at that time as "Category 1, Critical". The breed has since increased in numbers, and was rated in the 2007 RBST watchlist as "Category 4, At Risk".
