= Joe Henson =

Farmer and television presenter (1932-2015)

Joseph Leslie "Joe" Henson, MBE (16 October 1932 – 5 October 2015) was a farmer who founded the Rare Breeds Survival Trust and appeared as a presenter on BBC shows such as Animal Magic.

== Biography ==
Joe Henson was born in London. His father, Leslie Henson, was a well-known comedy actor, and his mother Harriet Collins was also a stage performer, using the name "Billie Dell". Joe's younger brother was the actor Nicky Henson; Joe's nephew is composer Christian Henson. The family moved to Northwood, where as a child he enjoyed visiting a nearby farm where they still used working horses and milked the cows by hand. Attended Follyfield House at Felsted School from 1946 to 1950.

After work as a herdsman in Somerset he attended the Royal Agricultural College, Cirencester (now the Royal Agricultural University). He worked for Earl Bathurst, then managed Salperton Park Estate near Cheltenham, before taking over the tenancy of Bemborough Farm from Corpus Christi College, Oxford with a former schoolfriend, John Neave.

He started to keep rare breeds, including Gloucestershire Old Spot pigs, and in 1971 opened the Cotswold Farm Park to the public. He was the founder-chairman of the Rare Breeds Survival Trust, and received an MBE in the 2011 Queen's Birthday Honours for services to conservation.

His son, Adam, who took over the running of the farm in 1999, is a presenter on the weekly BBC countryside show Countryfile. Joe Henson also occasionally appeared on Countryfile, usually as a specialist adviser on items relating to rare breeds.
