= Dorset Down =

Breed of sheep

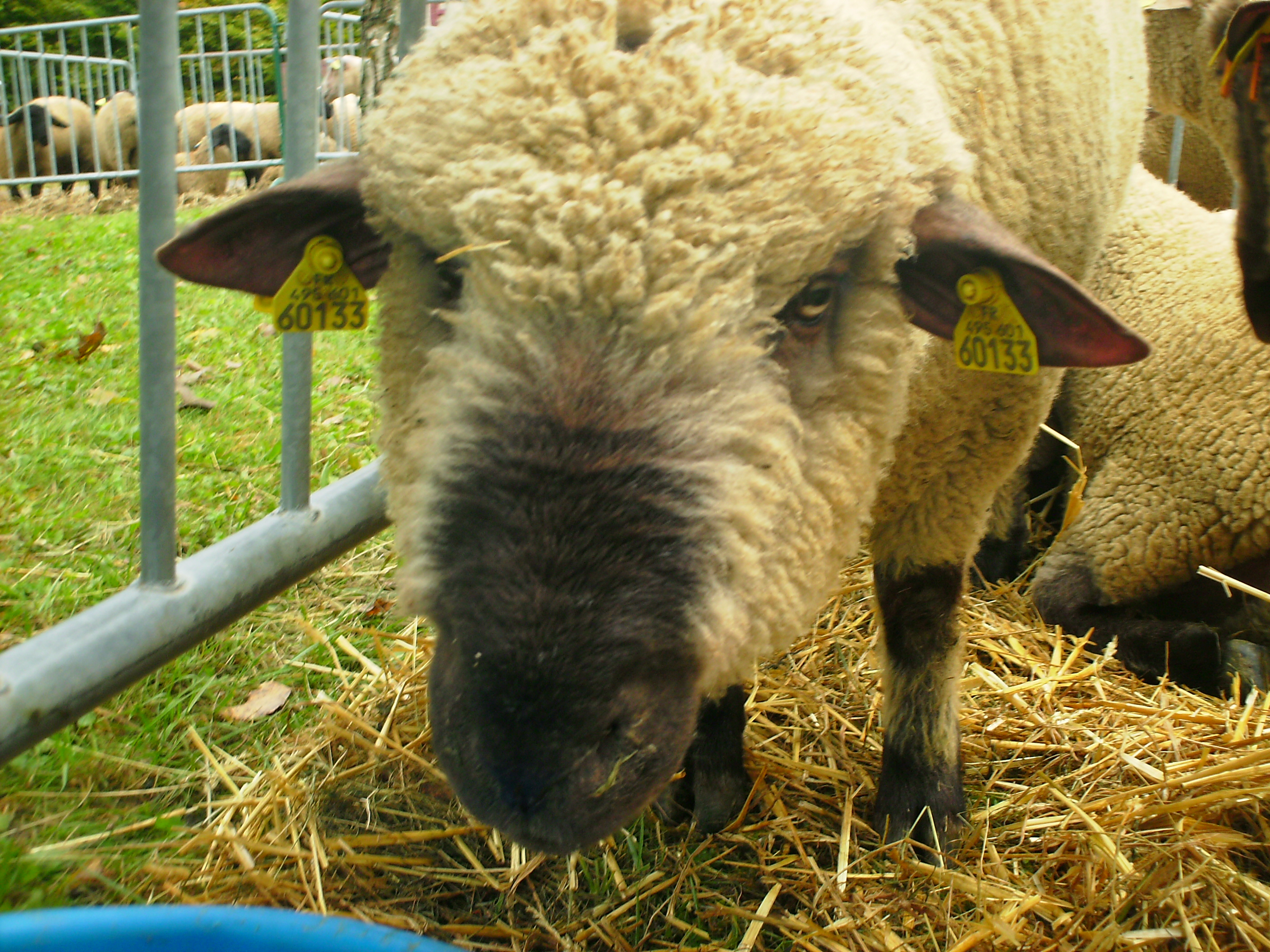
A Dorset Down in France

The Dorset Down is a breed of sheep native to the Dorset Downs region of England. It originated in the early 19th century from crosses of local and Hampshire ewes with Southdown rams. The breed is not closely related to the Dorset (a.k.a. Dorset Horned), which is a white-faced sheep.

Dorset Downs are medium-sized, robust sheep with dark faces and short wool. Prior to the importation of Continental breeds like the Texel, the Dorset Down was a popular terminal sire breed in the United Kingdom. Today it is listed as a minority breed by the Rare Breeds Survival Trust. It was also exported to North and South America, New Zealand and Australia, but remains fairly rare in those countries as well.
