= Oxford Down =

Breed of sheep

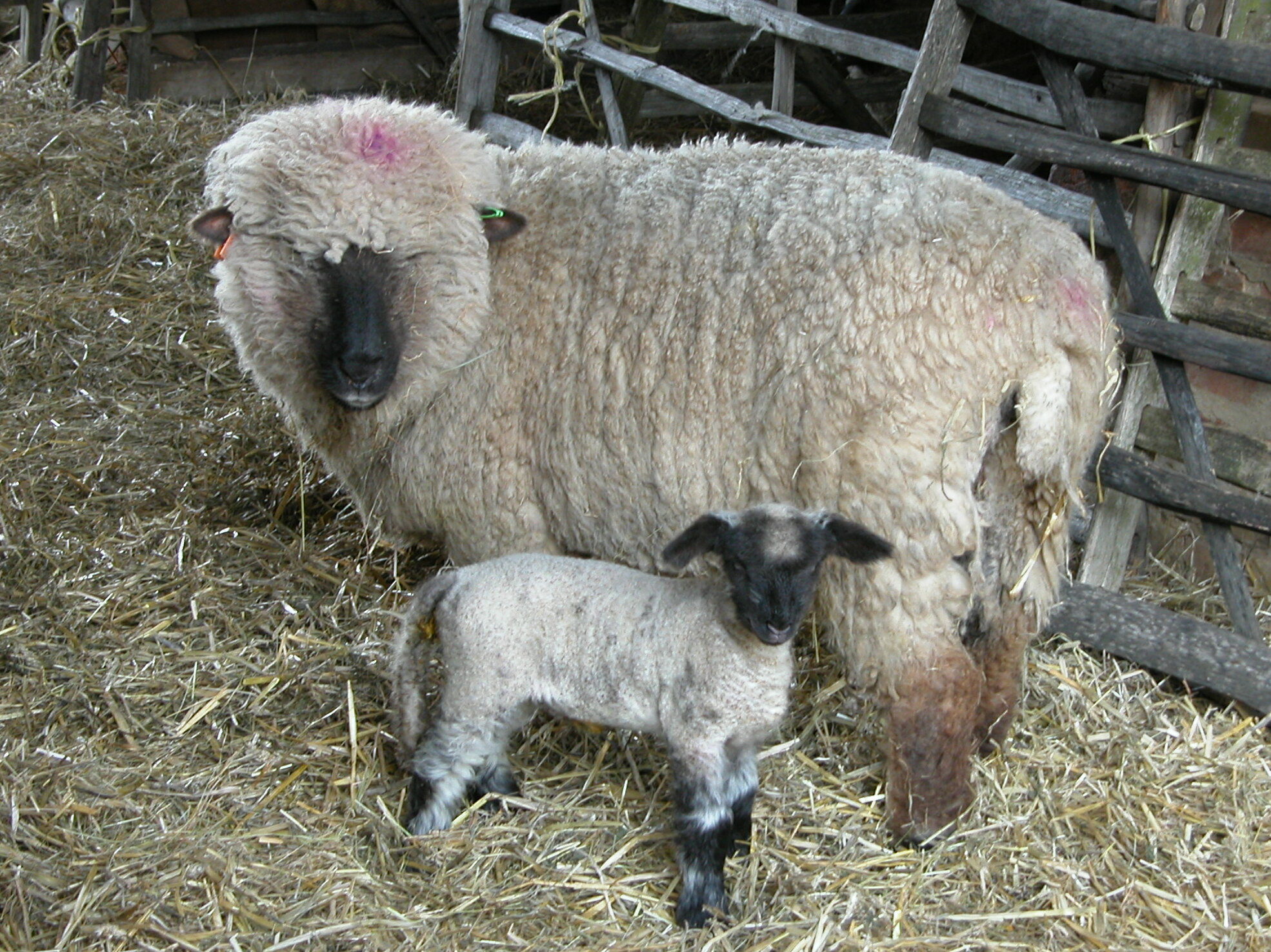
- Ewe and lamb at the Chiltern Open Air Museum
- Conservation status: FAO (2007): not at risk; DAD-IS (2022): at risk/endangered; RBST (2022): at risk
- Country of origin: United Kingdom
- Distribution: Europe, North America
- Standard: Oxford Down Sheep Breeders Association
- Use: meat; terminal sire

Traits
- Weight: Male: 110–145 kg; Female: 90–110 kg
- Height: Male: 86 cm; Female: 76 cm
- Wool colour: white
- Face colour: brown or black
- Horn status: polled

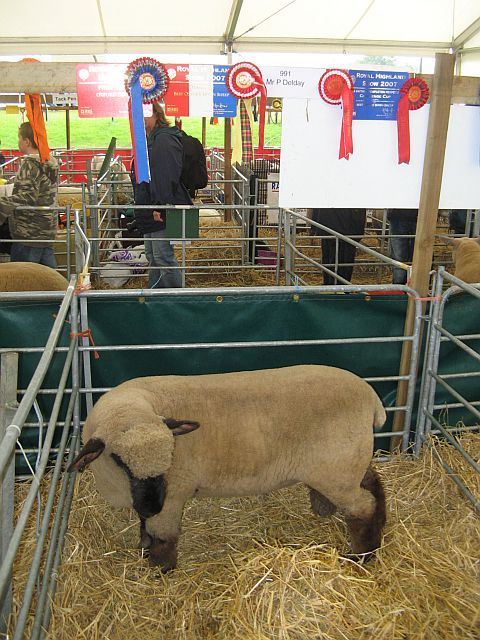
Oxford Down sheep at a livestock show

The Oxford Down is a British breed of domestic sheep. It was developed in the 1830s by cross-breeding of Hampshire Down and Southdown ewes with Cotswold rams. It is reared primarily for meat.

== History ==
The Oxford Down developed from about 1830, when Hampshire Down and Southdown ewes were put to Cotswold rams. Much of this breeding took place in the area of Witney in western Oxfordshire, and this gave rise to the breed name. A breed society, the Oxford Down Sheep Breeders Association, was formed in 1889 and a flock-book was published in the same year.

In the twenty-first century it is an endangered breed in the United Kingdom, and is listed as 'at risk' on the watchlist of the Rare Breeds Survival Trust. A population of just over 1000 head was reported to DAD-IS in 2021. Outside the UK, it is distributed ten other European countries and in Canada and the United States; the global population is estimated to be some 20000 head, and its international conservation status is 'not at risk'.

== Characteristics ==
The Oxford Down is a very large sheep, the largest of the Down breeds, robust and powerful. Rams weigh some 110–145 kg and ewes 90–110 kg. It is a shortwool breed, white on the body with brown or black wool on the face and lower legs. It produces the heaviest fleece of any of the Down breeds. Its capacity to produce a large, meaty carcase for further processing has stimulated interest from the meat industry, and it also grows the most wool of any of the terminal sire breeds.
