= Devon Longwool =

British breed of sheep

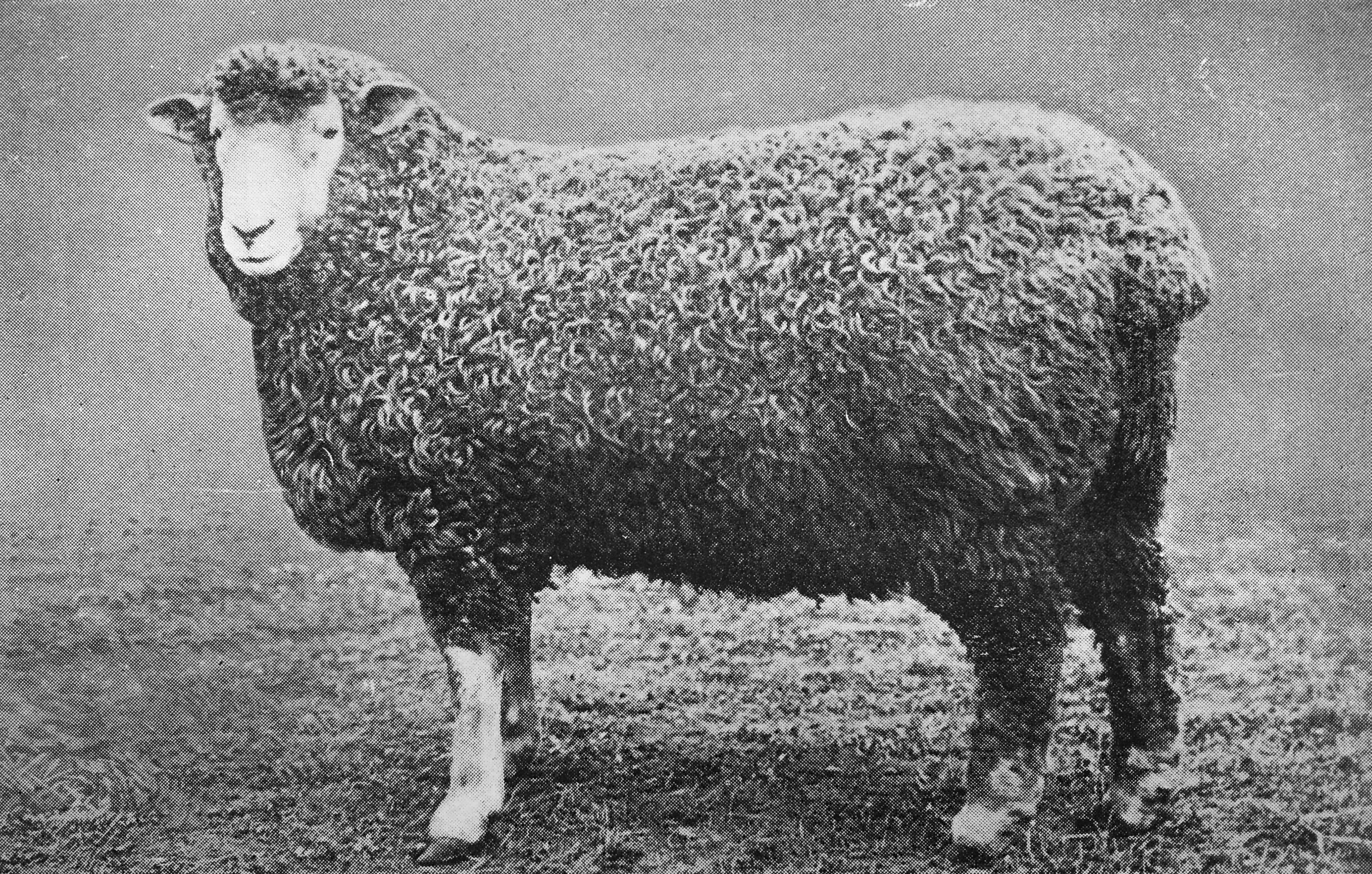
- Photograph from the Encyclopædia Britannica of 1911
- Conservation status: Extinct
- Other names: Devon Longwoolled
- Country of origin: United Kingdom
- Distribution: Northern Devon, southern Somerset
- Type: Upland
- Use: Wool

Traits
- Face colour: white
- Horn status: Polled (hornless)

The Devon Longwool was a British breed of domestic sheep from south-west England. It was distributed in southern Somerset and northern Devon, and was – like the Greyface Dartmoor and the South Devon – a polled longwool sheep. It is now considered extinct, as in 1977 it was merged with the South Devon to form the Devon and Cornwall Longwool.

== History ==
A breed society, the Devon Longwool Sheep Breed Society, was formed in 1898. A flock book was begun in 1900.
