= Suffolk sheep =

British breed of sheep

Suffolk
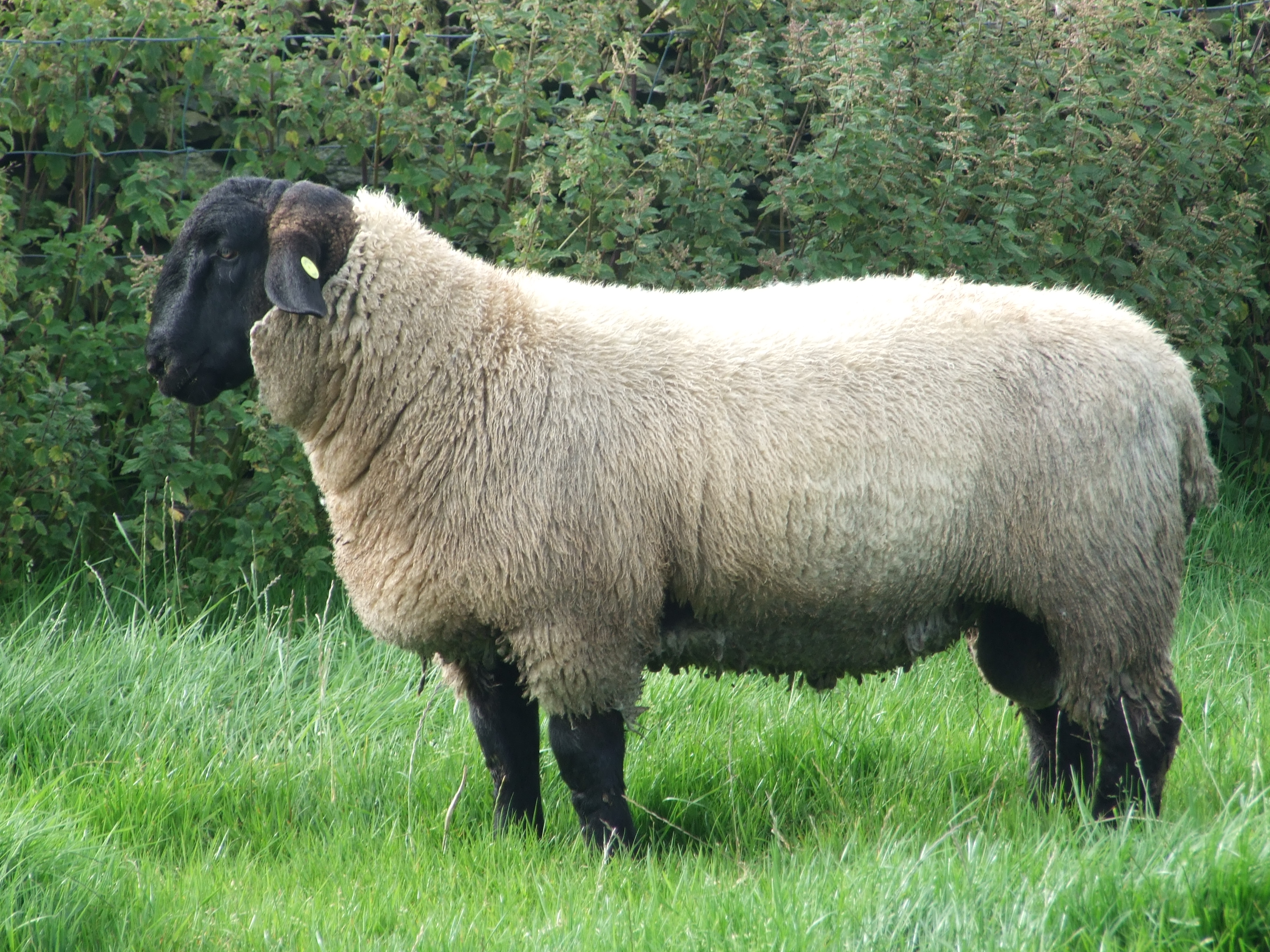
- A seven-month-old ram lamb
- Conservation status: FAO (2007): not at risk; DAD-IS (2022): not at risk
- Country of origin: United Kingdom
- Distribution: world-wide
- Standard: Suffolk Sheep Society
- Use: meat; cross-breeding

Traits
- Weight: Male: 125 kg; Female: 88 kg
- Height: Male: 80 cm; Female: 74 cm
- Skin colour: unpigmented
- Wool colour: white
- Face colour: black
- Horn status: polled

The Suffolk is a British breed of domestic sheep. It originated in the late eighteenth century in the area of Bury St. Edmunds in Suffolk, as a result of cross-breeding when Norfolk Horn ewes were put to improved Southdown rams. It is a polled, black-faced breed, and is raised primarily for its meat. It has been exported to many countries, and is among the most numerous breeds of sheep worldwide.

== History ==
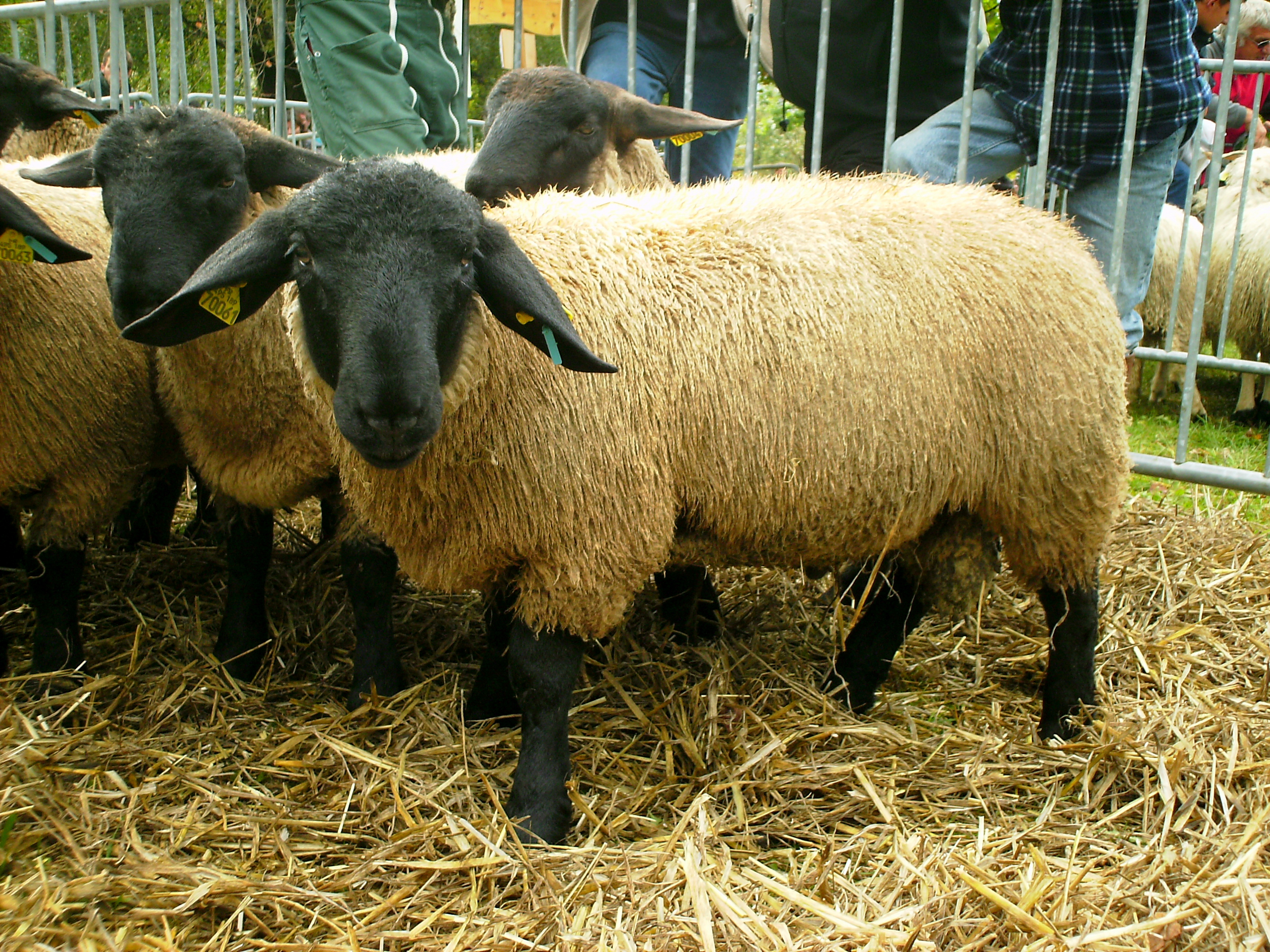
At an agricultural show

The Suffolk originated in the area surrounding Bury St. Edmunds in Suffolk in the late eighteenth century, as a result of cross-breeding when Norfolk Horn ewes were put to improved Southdown rams. They were at first known as Blackfaces or Southdown-Norfolks; the first use of the name "Suffolk" for these sheep dates to 1797. In 1810 it was recognised as distinct breed, but was not known by the present name until 1859. A breed society, the English Suffolk Society, was formed in 1886; a flock-book published in the following year recorded some 15000 ewes. By the end of the nineteenth century the Suffolk had displaced the Oxford Down as the principal terminal sire used on cross-bred ewes in Scotland. By the 1980s breed numbers in the United Kingdom had risen to some 500000 head, but later fell; in 2020 a total population of 14266 was reported.

The Suffolk has been exported to many countries including Australia, Austria, Belgium, Brazil, Canada, Czechoslovakia, France, Germany, Italy, Kenya, the Netherlands, New Zealand, Portugal, South Africa, Spain, and the United States, and has become one of the most numerous sheep breeds in the world. It was introduced to the United States in 1888 by one G. B. Streeter of Chazy, New York. A large and long-legged sub-type has developed there; it is fast-growing, but the carcase is of lower quality.

== Characteristics ==
The Suffolk is a large sheep, white-woolled and polled, with a black face and black legs free of wool.

Spider lamb syndrome may occur in the Suffolk breed.

== Use ==
Suffolk rams are commonly used as a terminal sire on cross-bred ewes to produce fast-growing lambs for slaughter.
