= Jonas Webb =

British farmer (1796–1862)

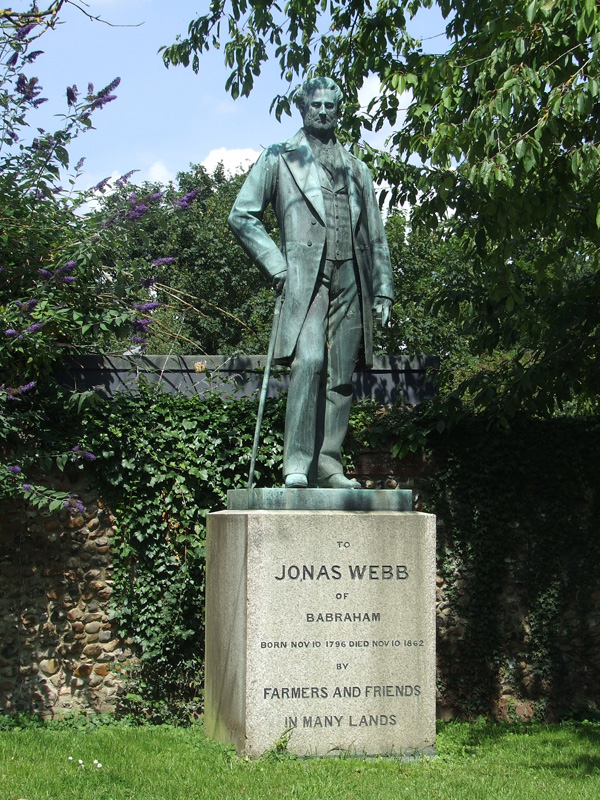
Statue of Jonas Webb in Babraham, Cambridgeshire

Jonas Webb (10 November 1796 – 10 November 1862) was an English farmer and stock breeder who was responsible for developing the Southdown breed of sheep into its modern form.

Webb was born in Great Thurlow in Suffolk but began farming in Babraham, Cambridgeshire in 1822. He acquired a flock of the then rare Southdowns from John Ellman of Glynde, Sussex and bred them to produce a strain of larger size, earlier maturity and improved fleece quality.

By the 1830s, he had become the leading breeder of Southdowns and in the 1840s and 1850s won prizes at virtually every annual Royal Agricultural Society exhibition, until in 1860 he won all six prizes offered by the society for rams. He achieved international recognition in 1855 at the Paris Universal Exhibition, winning a gold medal. Emperor Napoleon III admired his exhibits and was presented with Webb's prize ram in return.

Webb was also a noted breeder of cattle; his shorthorn herd was praised by contemporaries and won him several prizes.

Webb died in 1862, shortly after breaking up his flocks and retiring. His sheep were exported all over the world, to countries including France, Spain, Australia and New Zealand. He was commemorated with a statue at the Cambridge Corn Exchange; it is now located in his home village of Babraham.
