= Shropshire sheep =

Breed of sheep

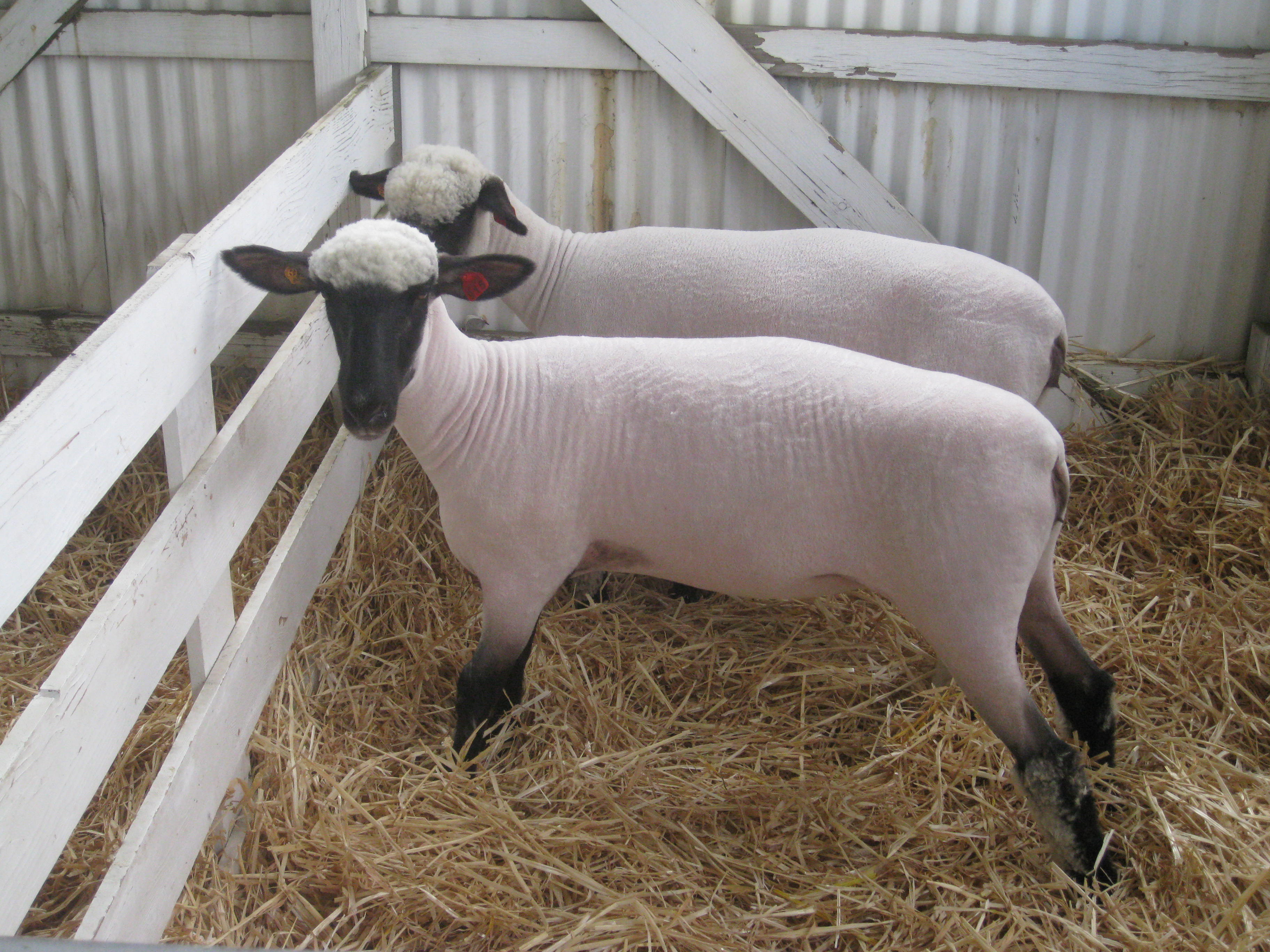
Modern American Yearling Shropshire ewes shorn for showing at a fair

The Shropshire breed of domestic sheep originated from the hills of Shropshire, and North Staffordshire, England, during the 1840s. The breeders in the area used the local horned black-faced sheep and crossed them with a few breeds of white-faced sheep (Southdown, Cotswold, and Leicester). This produced a medium-sized polled (hornless) sheep that produced good wool and meat. In 1855 the first Shropshires were imported into the United States (Virginia). This breed is raised primarily for meat.

== 1800s ==
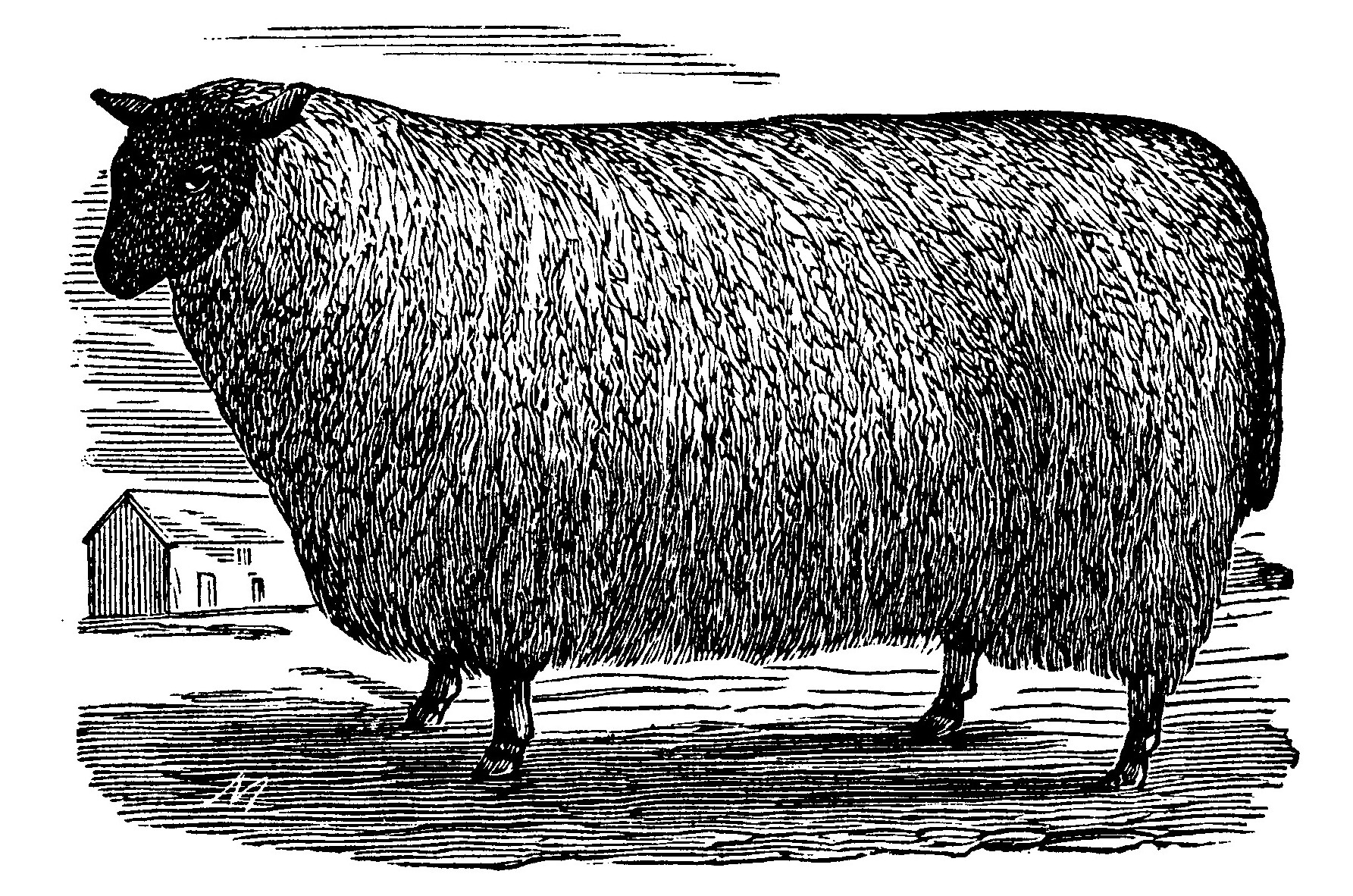
In Brett's Colonists' Guide (1883)

In 1859 the breed was officially recognized by the Royal Agricultural Society as being a distinct breed. The popularity of the Shropshire breed grew rapidly in England, and in 1882 Shropshire breeders founded the Shropshire Sheep Breeders' Association and Flock Book Society, the world's first such society for sheep. The same year the Society published the first Flock Book, a record of sheep bred and their breeders. The Society still survives, and still publishes a Flock Book annually.

By 1884 more Shropshires were exhibited at the local shows than all other breeds combined. The first documented flock in the United States (one ram and twenty ewes) was brought to Maryland in 1860 by Samuel Sutton. Thousands of Shropshires were exported to the United States after that, as well as to other parts of the English speaking world, notably Australia and New Zealand, and to South America. The breed's adaptability to most environments and their dual-purpose nature led to them quickly becoming a popular breed.

In 1884 the American Shropshire Registry was formed and by the turn of the 20th century the Shropshire was the most numerous breed of sheep in the United States.

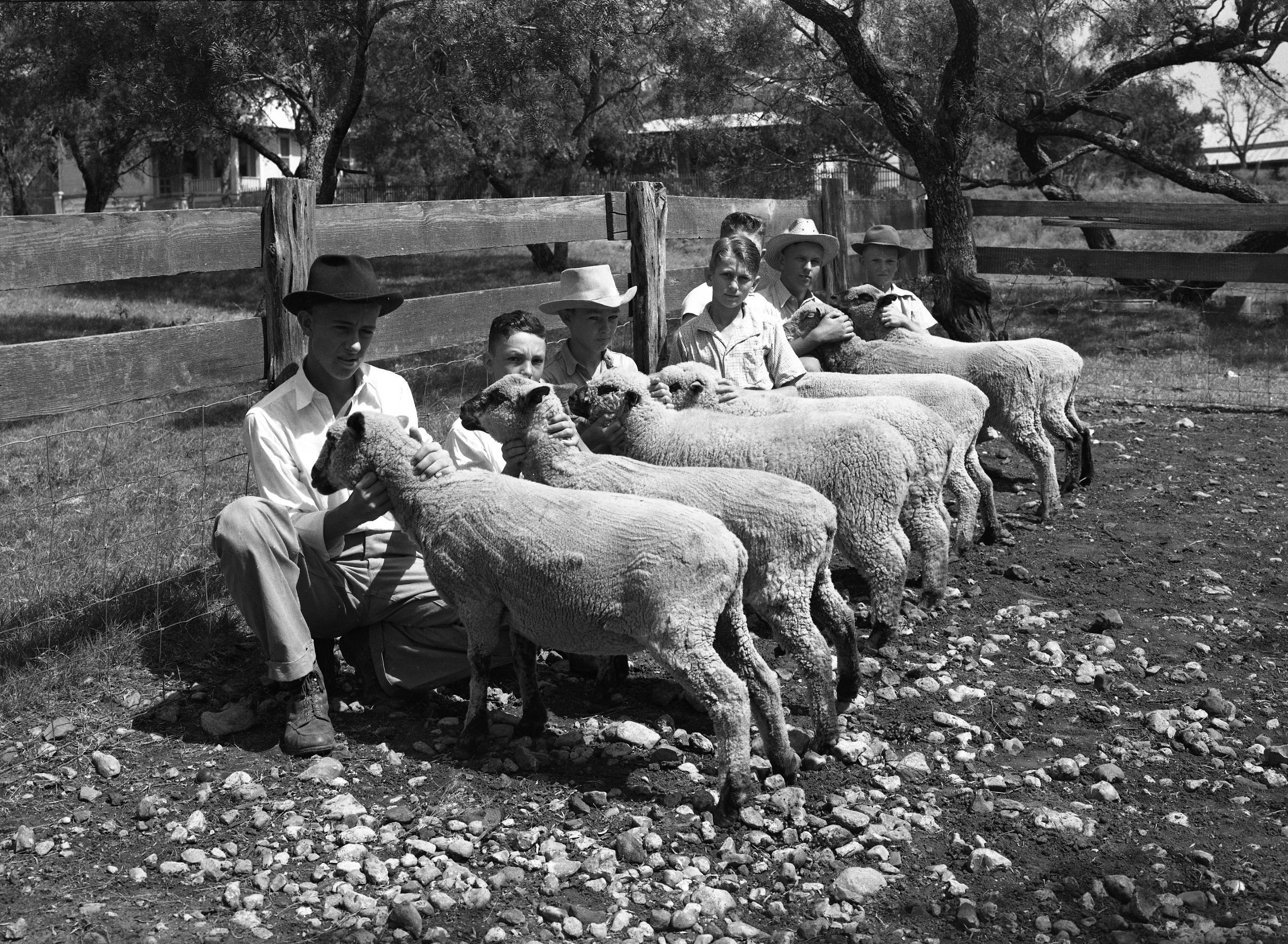
4-H Shropshire sheep, recently shorn. Circa 1940s

== 1900s ==
By the 1930s the Shropshire had been dubbed "the farm flock favorite" in the United States; but in the 1940s, US breeders began producing Shropshires with more wool cover and decreased size. This led to the breed having increased wool cover around the eyes, thus needing to be trimmed around the eyes for better sight. This hindrance and overall loss of size led to the numbers of the breed decreasing among American farmers. They were no longer the most popular breed of sheep, and became increasingly rare around the world, even in their homeland.

In the 1950s, some Shropshire breeders began going back to the original traits that made the breed so popular. They imported some select open-faced Shropshire rams from England with larger size, which helped once again to produce a breed of sheep with medium size and good wool and meat production. The Shropshire became an increasing popular breed among farmers with their ability to adapt to varying environments.

Despite its popularity in the early 1900s, today the traditional Shropshire sheep is considered a rare breed in most countries. However, the modern Shropshire is rising in popularity as a show sheep, especially in the Midwestern US. Its gentle nature and medium size make it very popular with 4-H exhibitors. The mature weights for modern Shropshire rams are between 225 and 250 pounds and between 150 and 180 pounds for the females. The long-legged, long-necked modern American Shropshire bears little resemblance to the breed type and character of the heritage-type Shropshire sheep.

In the 1990s, Shropshires were found to be the only breed that would not nibble on conifers or bite off the bark of fruit trees, making them especially popular with Christmas tree farmers. Not only do they keep the grass short, making herbicides unnecessary, but their droppings turned out to be good manure for the saplings.

== The original 1929 heritage Shropshire Breed Description ==
General Appearance: Alert, attractive, indicating breeding and quality, with stylish carriage and a symmetrical form, showing the true characteristics of the Shropshire, covered with fine, dense wool. Active with a free action. Shoulders blending smoothly into the ribs. A full heart girth, strong and straight back with adequate body capacity.

Constitution: Robust as indicated by width and depth of chest, strength and formation of neck, and by bold active movement.

Size: Medium-sized; in breeding condition when fully matured, rams should weigh 180 to 240 lbs, and ewes should be 140 to 200 lbs. Fleece and Skin:

Fleece: Of good length, dense, elastic to touch, medium fine, free from black fibre, well crimped, with evenness of texture throughout; scrotum of rams well covered with wool. The skin of a light cherry colour, clear and free from dark spots.

Body: Well fleshed, long, deep and symmetrical. Well proportioned, with shoulders strong, smooth and blending well into body, well placed, fitting smoothly upon chest, which should be deep and wide; forearm well muscled; long, broad, straight level back; well sprung ribs; thick, wide and long loins well covered with firm flesh; hips wide and smooth. Rump long, hind quarters well developed, long and wide with dock well set on and twist deep and full, legs of mutton full, deep and well-muscled.

Head and Neck: Head, short, broad between the ears and eyes, bold and masculine in rams, without horns; straight or slightly dished face, broad muzzle, masculine on rams, feminine on ewes; white dense wool well covering the whole poll and cheeks and jaw; eyes bright and alert; colour of face and ears dark brown, grey nose hairs permissible. Neck short, strong and muscular (especially in rams), symmetrically blending head and shoulders in graceful outlines..

Ears: Short, alert and well set, not upright but perpendicular to head, moderate thickness, colour same as face and legs, cinnamon to dark brown or soft black. Rounded tips, wool covering outside ear.

Legs and Feet: Legs strong, short, straight, well wooled and well set apart; colour of hair on legs dark chocolate brown, and colour of wool on legs white; feet sound, short in the hoof, and set squarely under the sheep.

Objections: Animals otherwise good, undersized, oversized; long legs; long neck; narrow bodies; dark fibre in wool, dark skins, white specks on ears, face and legs; horns or horn stubs on rams; lack of wool covering on cap or underneath body, face and legs; skin folds in neck area; long, large or drooping ears, thick skinned or coarse; coarse or Roman nose; jet-black face and leg colour; black armpit; lack of wool below hocks and knees.
