= Cotswold sheep =

British breed of sheep

Cotswold
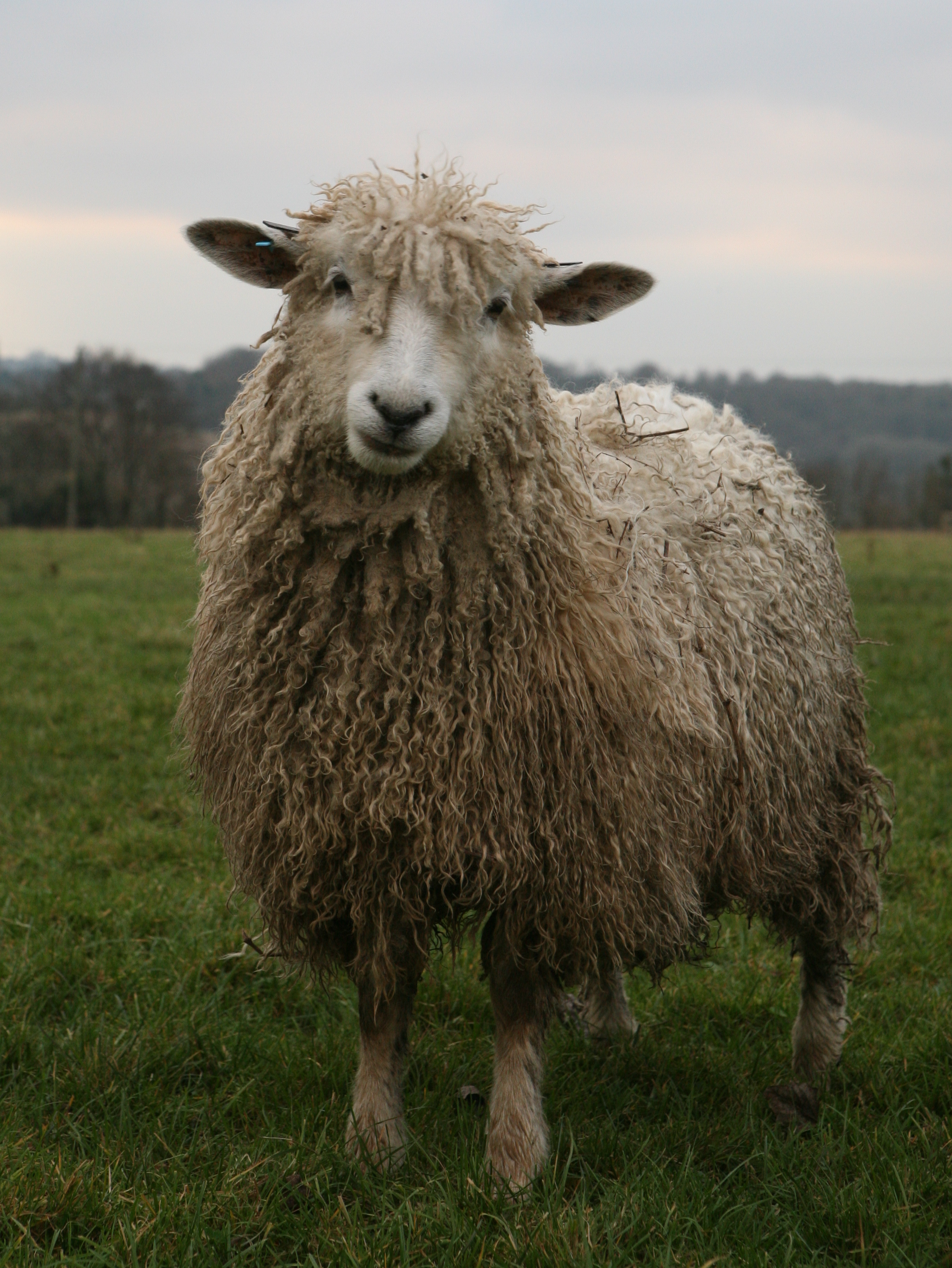
- Ewe at Combe, Witney, Oxfordshire

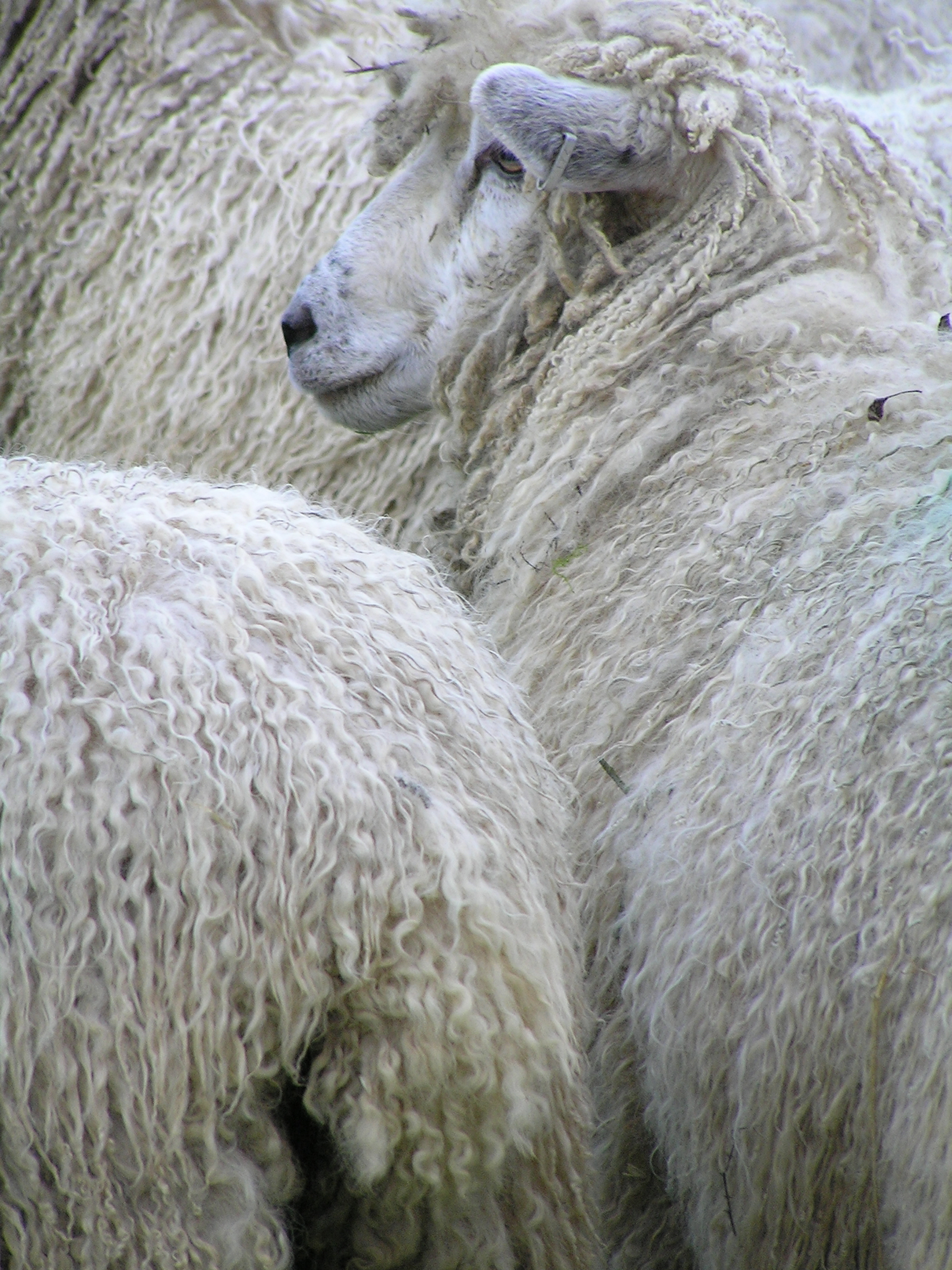
- Conservation status: FAO (2007), worldwide: not at risk; DAD-IS (2021), local: at risk; RBST: at risk
- Country of origin: United Kingdom
- Standard: Cotswold Sheep Society

Traits
- Weight: Male: 130 kg; Female: 85–90 kg
- Wool colour: white
- Face colour: white
- Horn status: polled in both sexes

The Cotswold is a British breed of domestic sheep of lustre longwool type. It originates in, and is named for, the Cotswold range of limestone hills in the South West, South Central England and West Midlands. It is a large sheep, and is kept as a dual-purpose breed, providing both meat and wool.

It is a rare breed: in 2021, it was listed as "at risk" on the watchlist of the Rare Breeds Survival Trust.

== History ==
From Brett's Colonists' Guide (1883)

A separate show class for Cotswold stock was created at the Royal Show of 1862 in London. A breed society, the Cotswold Sheep Society, was established in 1892, and published a flock book with entries going back to late eighteenth century; this society became defunct in the 1920s. A new society with the same name was formed in 1966.

In 2009, it was classified on the watchlist of the Rare Breeds Survival Trust as "minority", the lowest of five levels of concern; in 2021, it was one of twenty-four breeds listed as "at risk".

In July 1964, a Roman-sculpted replica of a sheep's head was described as having been unearthed near Bibury Church in Gloucestershire, England. A photo of this sculpture is on page 6 of the booklet The Cotswold Sheep. The resemblance to modern Cotswold sheep is striking.

Stock was introduced to the United States by Christopher Dunn of New York State in 1832.

== Characteristics ==
The Cotswold is a large, tall sheep. Ewes weigh some 85–90 kg, and rams about 130 kg. It is polled in both sexes. The legs and face are without wool and are usually white; it has a pronounced forelock.

A black variant, the Black Cotswold, is recognised as a separate breed in the United States; a breed society was formed in 1990.

== Use ==
The Cotswold is reared both for wool and for meat. Lambs are commonly slaughtered at some four months old, when they may weigh 18–22 kg.

The wool is lustrous; fleeces weigh from 5.5 to 10 kg. Staple length is approximately 15–20 cm, with a Bradford Count of 44s–48s.
