= Rare breed =

Breed of poultry or livestock that has a very small breeding population

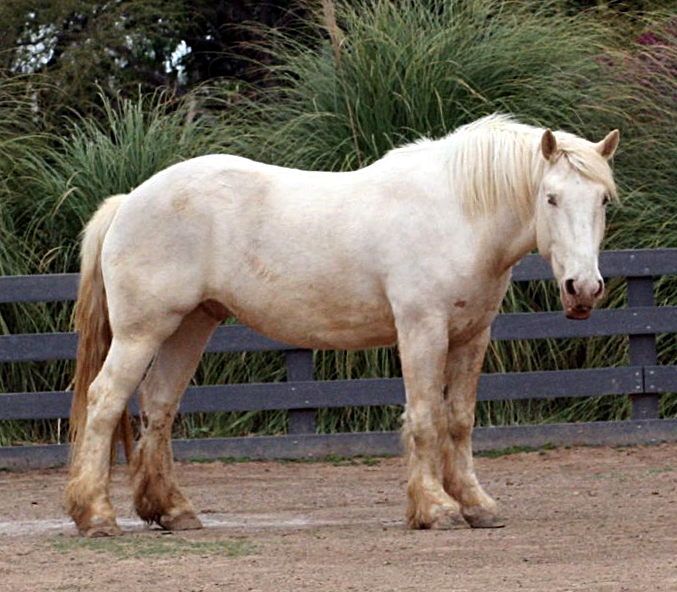
The American Cream Draft is listed as critically endangered by the American Livestock Conservancy

In modern agriculture, a rare breed is a breed of poultry or livestock that has a very small breeding population, usually from a few hundred to a few thousand. Because of their small numbers, rare breeds may have a threatened conservation status, and they may be protected under regional laws. Many countries have organizations devoted to the protection and promotion of rare breeds, for which they each have their own definition. In botany and horticulture, the parallel to rare animal breeds are heirloom plants, which are rare cultivars.

== Definitions ==
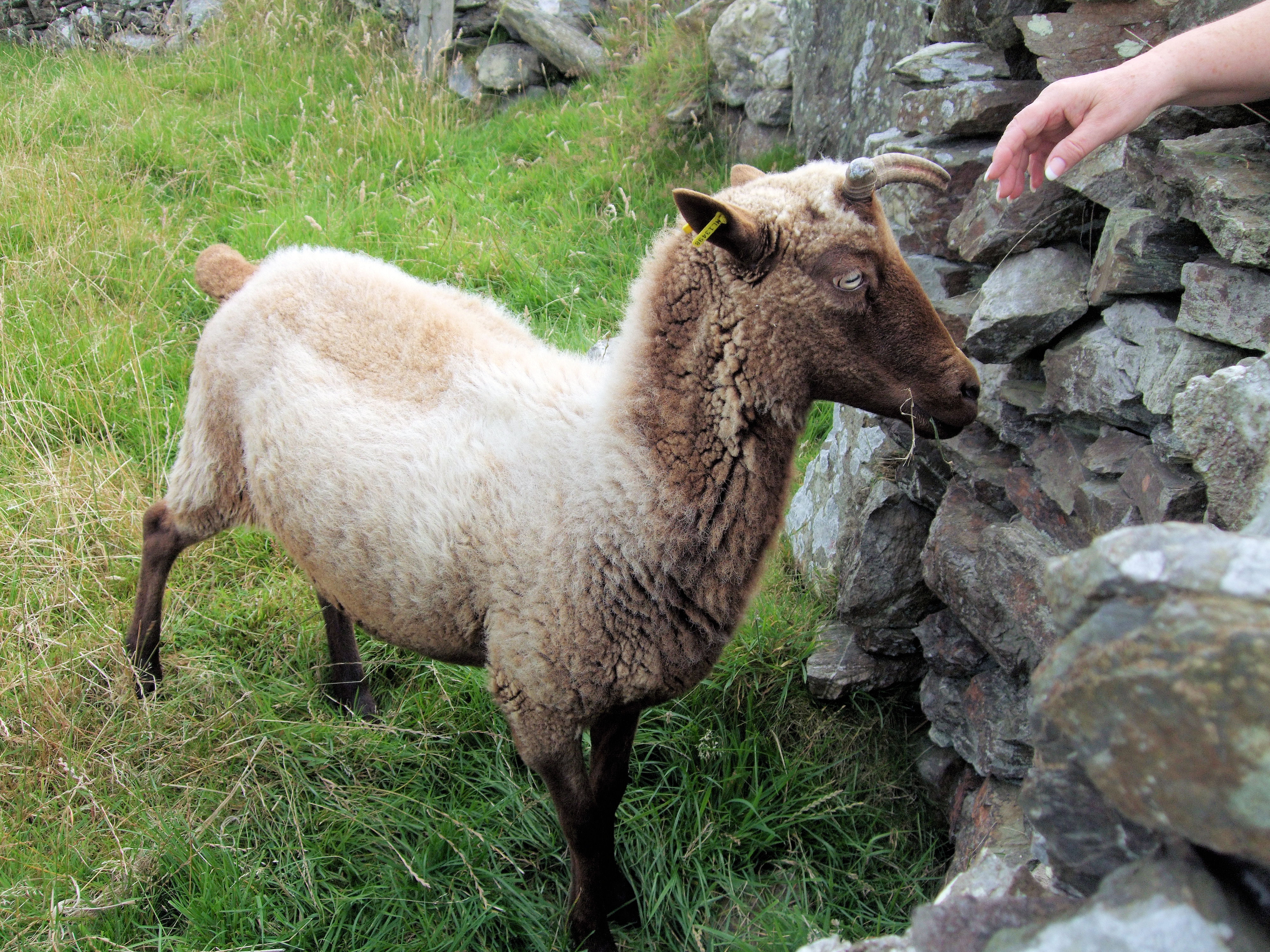
A rare breed Manx Loaghtan sheep at Cregneash, Isle of Man. There are fewer than 1,500 registered breeding Manx Loaghtan females in the United Kingdom.

There are several definitions of "breed" and "rare breed". Breeds may be defined as a group of animals that share visible characteristics, such as Pinto horses, which are all spotted. A stricter definition insists that breeds are "consistent and predictable genetic entities", which means that individuals from that breed will produce offspring that is predictably similar to their genitors, and that this similarity is genetically based. This biological definition is useful for conservation, which treats breeds as reliable sources of genetic diversity.

Conservation organisations each have their own definition of what constitutes a rare breed. The Rare Breeds Survival Trust (RBST) and The Livestock Conservancy (TLC) both divide rare breeds into five categories, "critical" being the rarest. TLC places a livestock breed under "critical" status when it has "fewer than 200 annual registrations in the United States and estimated global population less than 2,000". The RBST determines the status of a breed by the number of its breeding females in the United Kingdom. For horses and sheep, fewer than 300 is considered "critical", whereas goats and pigs must have fewer than 100 to join that category.

The Poultry Club of Great Britain considers a poultry breed "Rare" when it does not have its own breed club. These "Rare Breeds" are catered by the Rare Poultry Society (RPS). The RPS does not look after breeds that count few individuals but have their own breed club.

The British Rabbit Council (BRC) notes in its breed standards those rabbit breeds that have been recognized by the affiliated Rare Varieties Rabbit Club, of which there are currently 26 breeds.

== Causes ==
Major factors causing breeds to become rare are reported to include increased use of exotic breeds, weak policies and institutions in animal genetic resources management, neglect of certain breeds because of a lack of profitability or competitiveness, the intensification of production systems, the effects of diseases and disease management and loss of pastures or other elements of the production environment. In postwar Britain, for example, the introduction of the Poland China pig and the Texel sheep affected populations of historic breeds, which were seen as less profitable for farmers.

== Conservation ==
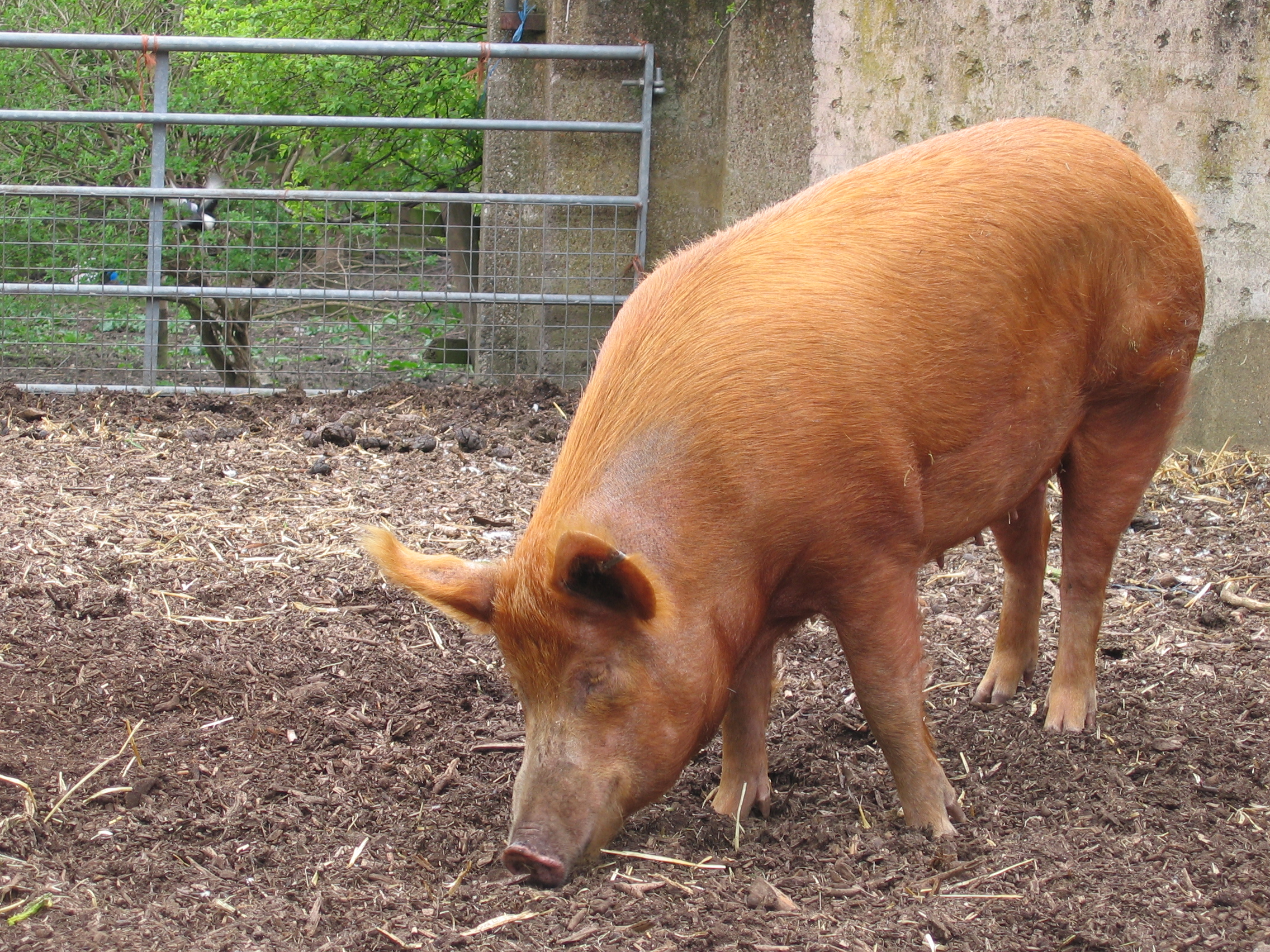
The Tamworth is a pig breed that is rare in both its native country and abroad.

Several organizations – the Food and Agriculture Organization (United Nations), The Livestock Conservancy, the Rare Breeds Survival Trust (UK), Rare Breeds Canada, the SVF Foundation (US) – promote conservation of rare livestock and poultry breeds for their unique traits, which can contribute to general biodiversity and cultural heritage. Animal Husbandry can be important to livestock production in harsh environments and may contribute to the adaptation of livestock populations to challenges such as shifts in disease epidemiology, climate or market demands.

Conservation activities may include in situ conservation programmes supporting the maintenance of breeds in their normal production environments (i.e. on farms, ranches or in pastoralist herds or flocks) and ex situ conservation programmes in which animals are kept at sites such as zoos or special conservation farms or genetic material (e.g. semen or embryos) is maintained in a cryoconserved form.

In 2009, The Livestock Conservancy launched an online classified advertising service for promoting rare breeds. It allows the general public to "browse listings of rare breed livestock and poultry for sale, rare breed products such as meats and wools and other items that help secure the future of rare breeds".

== Other interests of rare breeds ==
Beyond the concerns of conservation organisations, there are other reasons for individuals or groups to keep rare breed animals. Rare breeds can be popular with hobby farmers, as they often require less intensive management. Some rare breeds are kept by tourist attractions for their value in attracting visitors. Some farmers also prefer to sell meat from rare breeds, as they believe such breeds offer higher quality produce.

== See also ==
- Category:Conservation Priority Breeds of the Livestock Conservancy
- Ark of Taste
- Cobthorn Trust
- Heritage turkey
- Landrace
- Domestic Animal Diversity Information System
