= Cobthorn Trust =

- Founded: 1986
- Founder: Andrew J. Sheppy FLS FSB
- Purpose: Rare breeds and conservation
- Location: Congresbury, North Somerset, England
- Region served: International
- Website: http://www.cobthorn.org/

The Cobthorn Trust is a private non-profit trust in the United Kingdom that is dedicated to furthering conservation and preserving rare domestic animal breeds.

The trust was formed in 1986 by its former director, Andrew Sheppy. Until his death in 2017, the trust was involved in the conservation of several rare breeds, initiation of the National Poultry Collection, genetic research on Dexter cattle, and the development of conservation grazing.
