= Rare Breeds Survival Trust =

Conservation charity in the United Kingdom

- Abbreviation: RBST
- Formation: 1973
- Founder: Joe Henson
- Type: Conservation charity
- Legal status: Registered charity
- Purpose: Conservation of native livestock breeds of the United Kingdom
- Location(s): Stoneleigh Park Nr. Kenilworth Warwickshire CV8 2LG
- Coordinates: 52.3398°N 1.5243°W
- Region served: United Kingdom
- Chairman: John Atkinson
- Website: www.rbst.org.uk
- Remarks: Charity no. 269442

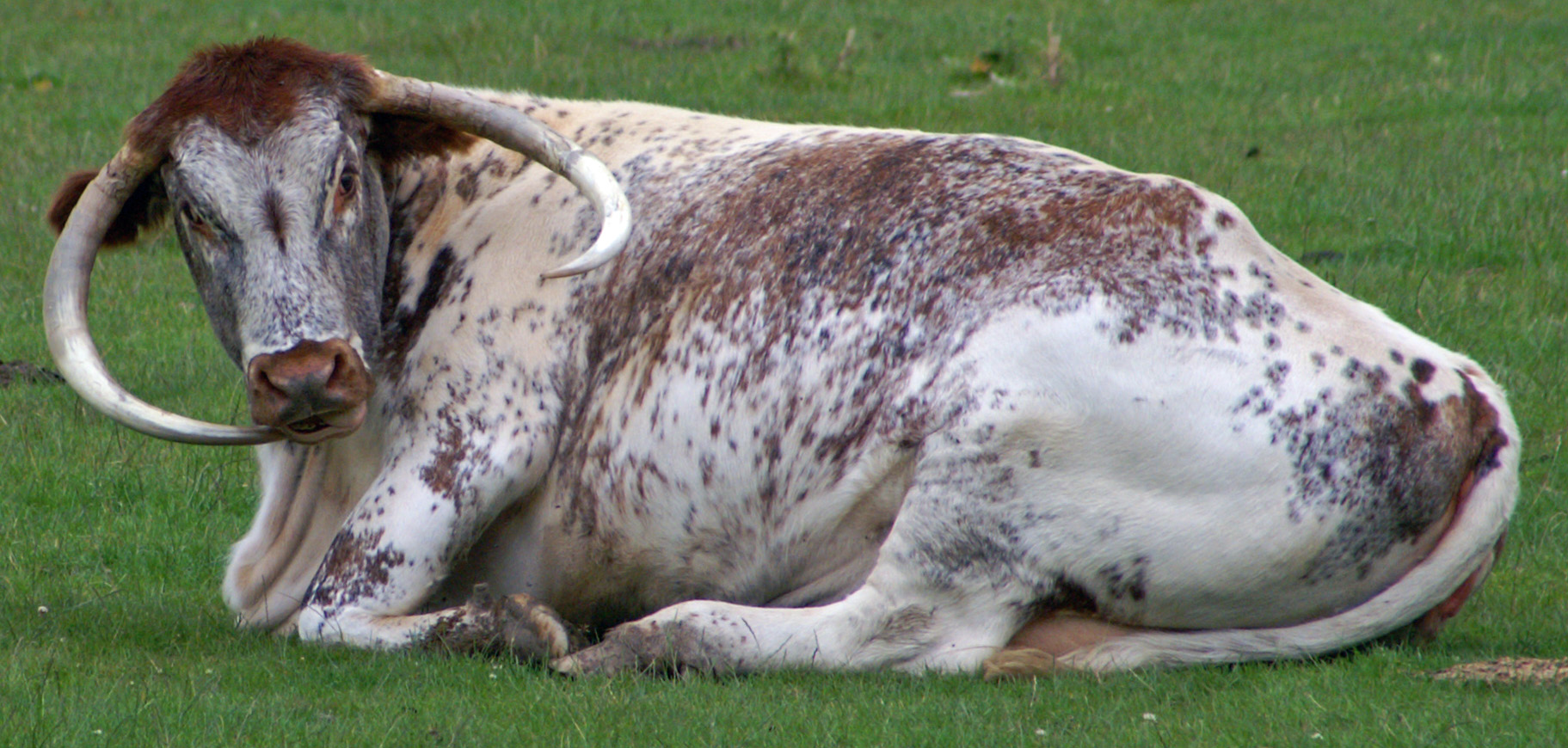
An English Longhorn cow

The Rare Breeds Survival Trust is a conservation charity whose purpose is to secure the continued existence and viability of the native farm animal genetic resources (FAnGR) of the United Kingdom. It was founded in 1973 by Joe Henson to preserve native breeds; since then, no UK-native breed has become extinct.

It maintains a watch list of rare native breeds of cattle, sheep, pigs, horses, goats and poultry, and an approved list of farm parks.

Projects have included the collection of genetic material to ensure the future of rare breeds in a farm animal "gene bank". This project received publicity in the wake of the foot-and-mouth disease crisis in the UK and was supported by Charles III (while he was the Prince of Wales). The Trust also supports the Manx Ark Project, which provides sanctuary for rare breeds at several sites in the Isle of Man.

== Watch list ==
RBST publishes a watch list of rare and native United Kingdom breeds of domestic cattle, sheep, pigs, horses, goats and poultry. In 2021, RBST changed their methodology from five classifications (critical, endangered, vulnerable, at risk, minority) to a two classification system (priority, at risk).

== See also ==
- Genetic diversity
- Similar organizations:
  - The Livestock Conservancy
  - Ark of Taste
  - Cobthorn Trust
  - Gesellschaft zur Erhaltung alter und gefährdeter Haustierrassen
