= Shorthorn =

British breed of cattle

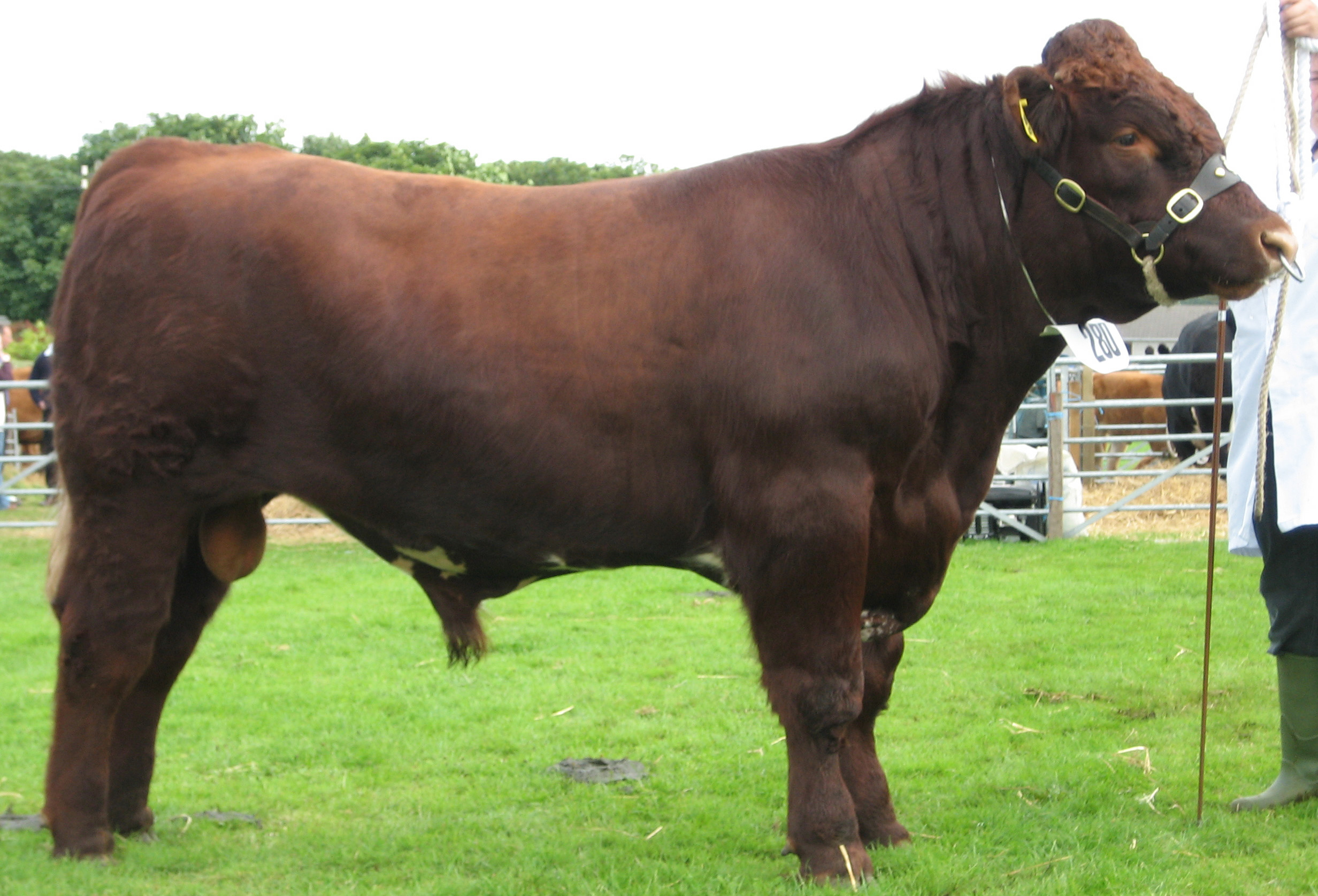
- A bull

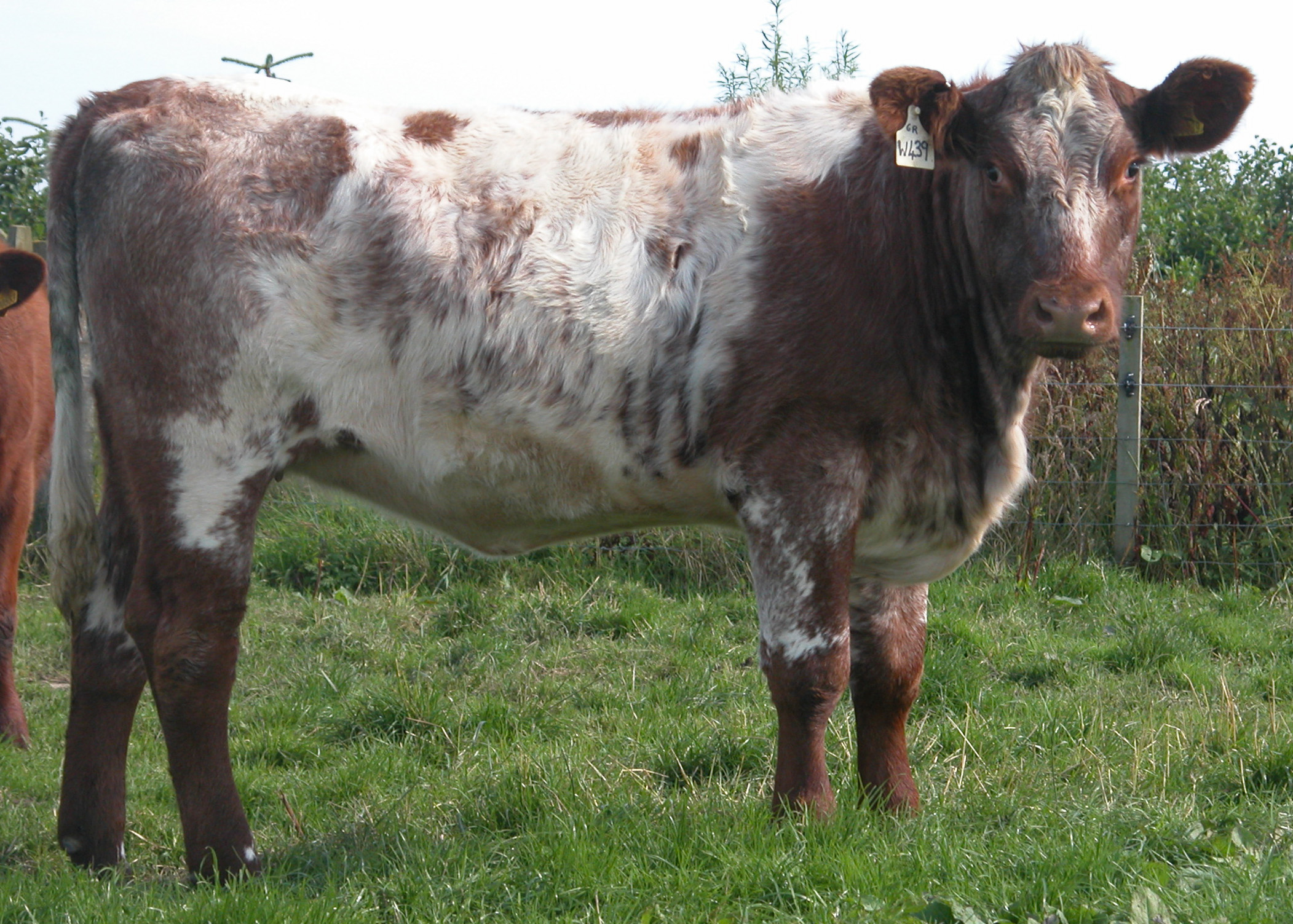
- A heifer
- Conservation status: FAO (2007): not at risk; DAD-IS (2025): not at risk
- Country of origin: United Kingdom
- Distribution: world-wide

The Shorthorn, Durham or Durham Shorthorn is or was a British breed of cattle. It originated in the counties of Durham and Yorkshire in north-eastern England and was already present in that area in the sixteenth century. In the United Kingdom it has developed into four separate recognised breeds: the Beef Shorthorn, the Dairy Shorthorn, the Northern Dairy Shorthorn and the Whitebred Shorthorn. In Australia seven shorthorn breeds are recognised: the Australian Shorthorn, the Beef Shorthorn, the Dairy Shorthorn, the Illawarra Shorthorn, the Poll Shorthorn, the Durham and the Weebollabolla Shorthorn. Others are the Japanese Shorthorn of Japan and the Milking Shorthorn of the United States.

Shorthorns are coloured red, white, or roan, although roan cattle are preferred by some, and completely white animals are not common. However, one type of Shorthorn has been bred to be consistently white – the Whitebred Shorthorn, which was developed to cross with black Galloway cattle to produce a popular blue roan crossbreed, the Blue Grey.

== History ==
The breed developed from Teeswater and Durham cattle found originally in the North East of England. In the late eighteenth century, the Colling brothers, Charles and Robert, started to improve the Durham cattle using the selective breeding techniques that Robert Bakewell had used successfully on Longhorn cattle. In 1796, Charles Colling of Ketton Hall, bred the famous Durham Ox. The culmination of this breeding program was the birth of the bull Comet, bred by Charles Colling, in 1804. This bull was subsequently sold for 1000 guineas in 1810 at the Brafferton sale, the first 1000-guinea bull ever recorded. Related cattle may have been imported to the United States by Harry Dorsey Gough of Baltimore, Maryland, before 1808.

At the same time, Thomas Bates of Kirklevington and John Booth of Killesby were developing the Teeswater cattle. The Bates cattle were subsequently developed for their milking qualities, whereas the Booth cattle were developed for their beef qualities. Animals taken to Scotland in 1817 from the Booth herd were used to produce the Beef Shorthorn breed.

In 1822, George Coates published the first volume of his herd book; this was the first pedigree herd book for cattle in the world.

Coates published the first four volumes, after which Henry Stafford took over the ownership and publishing of the herd book, retaining the name Coates's Herd Book. The Shorthorn Society of Great Britain and Ireland was founded in 1874, and purchased the copyright of the herd book from Strafford. They have continued to compile and publish Coates's Herd Book ever since. The American Shorthorn Herd Book was the first to be published in the United States for any breed and was started in 1846, with the formation of the American Shorthorn Association following 26 years later in 1872.

Tibial hemimelia, a rare genetic disorder, was identified in Canada in 1999 in a small number of Shorthorn cattle, all descended from a single individual.

== Distribution ==
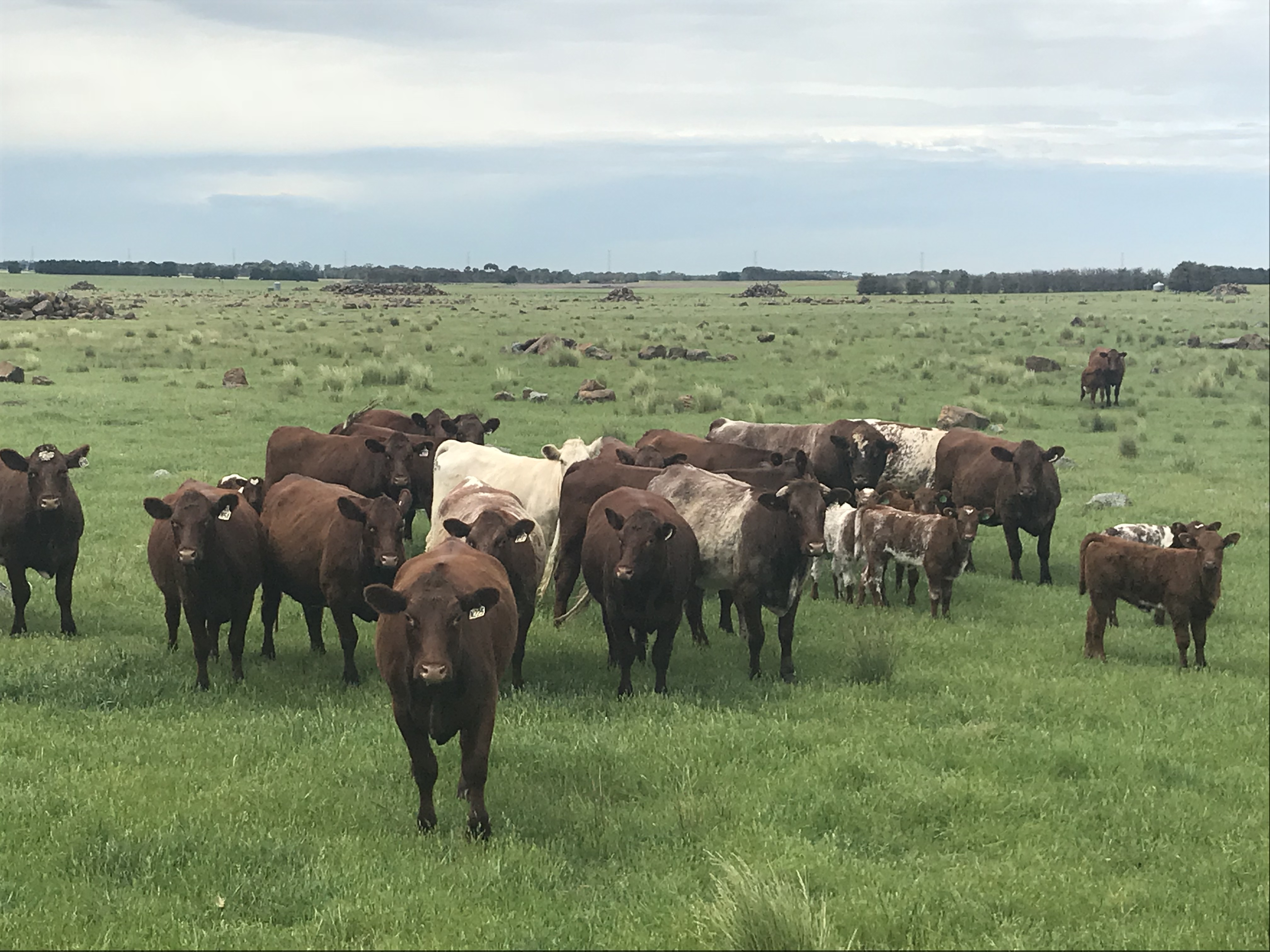
Cows and calves with bull in Barunah North, Victoria

Today, the breed is found mainly in English-speaking countries, and Southern South America. The main countries are: Argentina, Australia, Canada, New Zealand, Republic of Ireland, South Africa, United Kingdom, the United States of America, Uruguay, and Zimbabwe. Beamish Museum in north-eastern England preserves the Durham breed.

=== Australia ===
Shorthorns were among the first cattle imported into Australia: several cows were brought into New South Wales in 1800. More were imported in 1825 by Potter McQueen of Scone. Nine months later, the Australian Agricultural Company imported additional Shorthorns, and in the 1930s, Thomas Simpson Hall, the breeder of the Halls Heeler, imported Durham Shorthorns from which he developed extensive herds of Poll Shorthorns.

Shorthorns have contributed to the development of breeds such as the Belmont Red and Santa Gertrudis.
