= Charles Colling =

English stock breeder

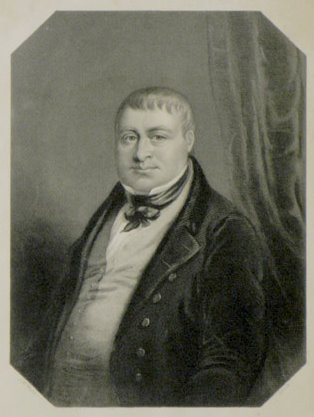
- Born: 1751
- Died: 16 January 1836 (aged 84–85)
- Occupation: Stock breeder

Charles Colling (1751 – 16 January 1836) was an English stock breeder. He, along with his brother Robert, was famous for his improvement of the Shorthorn breed of cows.

== Biography ==
Colling was one of the earliest and most successful improvers of the breed of shorthorn cattle. Born in 1751, he was the second son of Charles Colling (1721–1785) by Dorothy Robson (d. 1779), and succeeded his father in the occupancy of a farm at Ketton, near Darlington, in 1782, shortly after a visit he paid to the well-known breeder, Robert Bakewell. 'It is generally supposed that the great lesson that Charles Colling learnt during the three weeks he spent at Dishley was the expediency of concentrating good blood by a system of in-and-in breeding. ... What he really learnt at Dishley was the all-importance of "quality" in cattle, and he resolved to devote himself to the preservation and amelioration of the local cattle on the Tees and Skerne' (Bates, pp. 5–6).

On 23 July 1783, he married Mary Colpitts (b. 2 Feb. 1763; d. 25 April 1850), who was almost equally interested with himself in his breeding of improved shorthorns, and helped him greatly in his work. The first bull of merit he possessed was bought from his elder brother Robert and was subsequently known (after its sale by Charles) as 'Hubback.' This bull had been mated whilst at Ketton with cows afterwards famous called Duchess, Daisy, Cherry, and Lady Maynard. One of Hubback's daughters produced in 1795, by another celebrated bull called Favourite, a roan calf, which grew to be the famous Durham ox.

At five and a half years of age this animal had attained the weight of 3,024 lbs., and was sold as a show animal for 140l. After five months' exhibition, its then owner refused 2,000l. for it, and for six years afterwards perambulated the country with it. A portrait of the ox, painted by John Boultbee and engraved by John Whessell, was published in March 1802, and dedicated to John Southey, fifteenth Lord Somerville. At ten years old the ox scaled about 3,800 Ibs., but, dislocating its hip-bone, was killed at Oxford in April 1807. A still more famous animal was Comet, born in the autumn of 1804, which 'Charles Colling declared to be the best bull he ever bred or saw, and nearly every judge of short-horns agreed with him' (Bates, p. 16). A portrait of Comet, by Thomas Weaver, was in possession of Mr. Anthony Maynard of Harewood Grove, Darlington. Others belong to Mr. John Thornton of 7 Princes Street, Hanover Square, W., and Mr. H. Chandos-Pole-Gell, Hopton Hall, Derbyshire.

On 11 October 1810 Colling sold off his entire herd at a public auction, which was very largely attended. The prices fetched by each animal are quoted in many works on the subject (e.g. Youatt, Cattle (1834), p. 231; David Low, Breeds of Domestic Animals (1842), i. 51). Comet sold for one thousand guineas, and the forty-seven lots went in all for 7,116l. 18s., or an average of 151l. 8s. 5d. A testimonial was presented to Colling by forty-nine subscribers in the shape of a silver-gilt cup inscribed, 'Presented to Mr. Charles Colling, the great improver of the short-horned breed of cattle, by the breeders whose names are annexed, as a token of gratitude for the benefit they have derived from his judgment, and also as a testimony of their esteem for him as a man. mdcccx.' His brother Robert died ten years later, in 1820, but Charles lived on in retirement until 16 January 1836, when he died in his eighty-sixth year.

A picture of the two brothers by Thomas Weaver, probably painted about 1811, was engraved by William Ward, A.R.A., and published in 1825, and again in 1831. A reproduction of part of the engraving appears as the frontispiece of the 'Journal of the Royal Agricultural Society' for 1899. An engraving of Charles Colling by G. Cook, from a portrait by I. M. Wright, is in the 'Farmers' Magazine' for February 1844.
