= Thomas Booth =

English stock breeder and improver

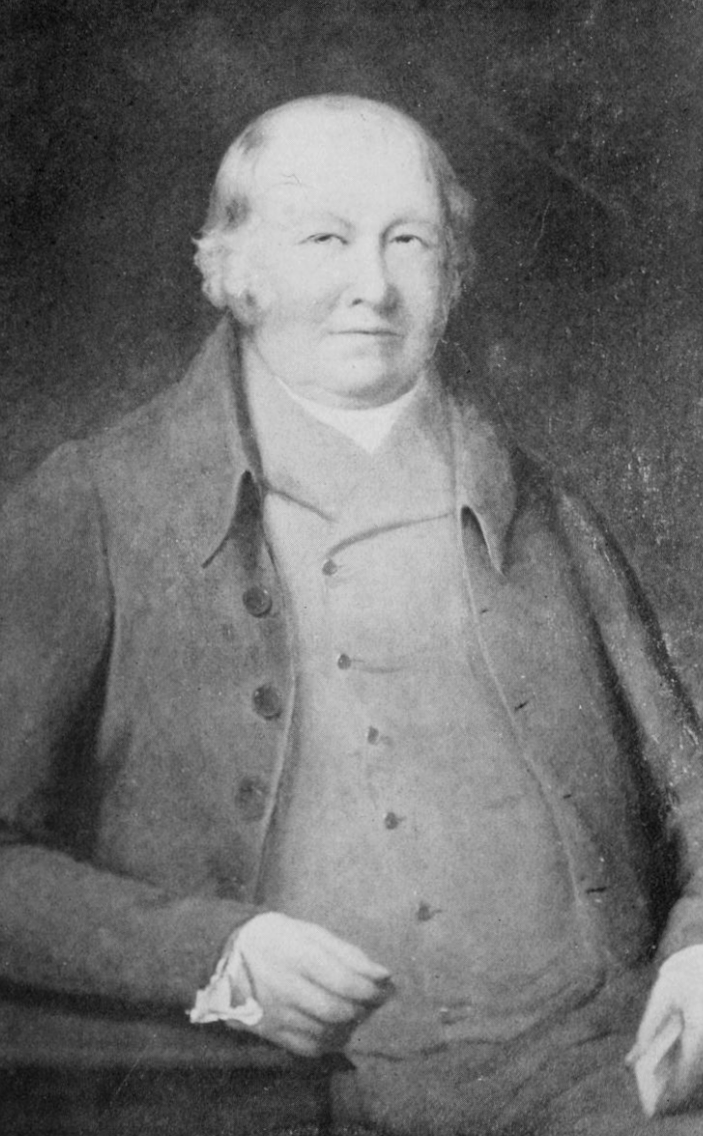
- Born: 1759 or 1760
- Died: 24 June 1836 (aged 77); Warlaby, North Yorkshire, England
- Occupation: Stock breeder
- Spouse: Miss Bower
- Children: 2

Thomas Booth (1759 or 1760 – 1836) was an English stock breeder and improver.

== Life ==
Booth was owner and farmer of the estate of Killerby near Catterick, Yorkshire, where, in 1790, he turned his particular attention to the breeding of shorthorns, selecting his cows from Mr. Broader of Fairholme, and the bulls from the stock of his contemporaries, Messrs. Robert and Charles Colling. His great aim was to raise a useful class of animals, that, besides possessing beauty of form, would milk copiously, fatten readily, and when slaughtered turn out satisfactorily to the butcher. With these views he sought to reduce the bone of the animal, especially the length and coarseness of the legs, the prominency of the hips, the heavy bones of the shoulders, and those unsightly projections called shoulder points, which previously were great defects in the unimproved shorthorns. In these efforts he was most successful, and his cows and bulls for many years carried away the highest prizes at the chief exhibitions of stock. About the period of 1814 he was considered to be the most enterprising and skilful improver of cattle in his district, if not of his day.

He removed to Warlaby in 1819, and gave up the Killerby estate and part of the shorthorn herd to his eldest son, John Booth, taking the remainder with him to Warlaby, where he died on 24 June 1836.

== Family ==
By his wife, Miss Bower, he had two sons, equally celebrated with their father as cattle breeders. John Booth, the eldest, had his own ideas about breeding stock. With infinite judgment he found among the pastures round Richmond fresh crosses for his cattle, and the public had such confidence in his judgment that they felt sure of his success in whatever he did. He found time to run horses at Catterick, and his dog Nips won the Wensleydale Cup in a coursing contest at Leyburn. For three seasons he was master of the Bedale hunt, and a constant attendant at the meets. Much of his time was also occupied in acting as a judge at exhibitions of stock. All his stock were sold off on 21 September 1852, when forty-four lots averaged 48l. 12s. 8d. He died at Killerby on 7 July 1857, aged 68, and was buried at Ainderby. Shortly afterwards a window to his memory was erected in Catterick church. In 1819 he married Miss Wright, by whom he left several sons, well known in the county.

Richard Booth, the second son of Thomas Booth, inherited with his father's name his full share of his father's skill as a breeder, with an equal fondness for the pursuit. He removed to Studley farm in 1814, which was speedily stocked with shorthorns. He was a great believer in in-breeding, and when he sold off in 1834 the best cows were fine animals in direct descent from Twin Brother to Ben, a bull bred by his father as far back as 1790. He gave up Studley farm in 1834, and sold off the whole of his herd except Isabella by Pilot, and retired to Sharrow, near Ripon. On the death of his father in the following year he succeeded to the estate and shorthorn herd at Warlaby, and again turned his attention to breeding. The judges of those days had not yet learned to distinguish between flesh and fat, and although the Booth cattle did not always carry away the prizes, the butchers well knew their worth, as they made the best carcass meat. When the royal cattle shows began in 1844, although not approving of such exhibitions, he felt obliged to exhibit; and although at first the quality of his cattle was not understood, it was not very long before his name was often found in the lists of those receiving medals and other rewards. He died at Warlaby on 31 October 1864, aged 76.
