= Milking Shorthorn =

Milking Shorthorn may refer to:

- the Dairy Shorthorn, a British breed of cattle
- the Milking Shorthorn (New Zealand), a similar New Zealand breed of cattle
- the Milking Shorthorn (North America), a related but not closely similar North American breed of cattle
