= Durham Ox =

English breeding steer (1796–1807)

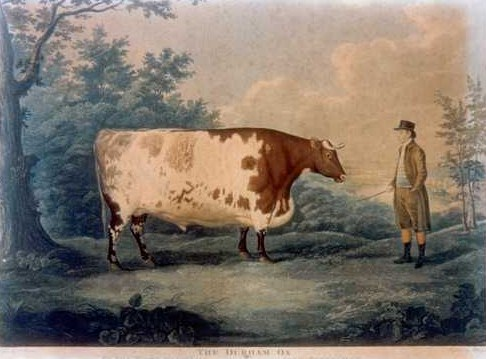
Etching of the Durham Ox by John Boultbee (1753–1812)

The Durham Ox (March 1796 – 15 April 1807) was a steer who became famous in the early 19th century for his shape, size and weight. He was an early example of what became the Shorthorn breed of cattle and helped establish the standards by which the breed was to be defined.

== History ==
The animal was born in March 1796 and was bred by Charles Colling of Ketton Hall, Brafferton in County Durham, north east England. Colling, together with his brother Robert, who farmed at nearby Barmpton, was a pioneer of the cattle-breeding movement of the late 18th and early 19th centuries. After a visit in 1784 to Robert Bakewell, a successful breeder of Longhorn cattle, Colling began using Bakewell's techniques to develop and improve the Shorthorn breed. The animal eventually known as the Durham Ox was the grandson of Colling's original bull Hubbach or Hubback, and became known as the Ketton Ox when he was exhibited in Darlington in 1799. He was painted as such at the age of five years in 1801 by George Cuit of Richmond.

In 1801 the ox was sold to John Day of Harmston, near Lincoln, for £250 (2025: £16,200), who renamed him the Durham Ox and had a carriage specially made to transport him, drawn by four horses. For the next five years the ox toured with him around England and Scotland, being exhibited to the public at agricultural fairs and other events. The ox proved extremely popular. For most of 1802 the Durham Ox was on show in London, where it is recorded that in one single day admission fees to see him totalled £97.

A dedication accompanying a 1802 painting of the ox by John Boultbee (1753–1812) gave details of the animal's measurements and estimated its weight as 171 st (2,390 lb; 1,090 kg), but later estimates ran as high as 270 st (3,800 lb; 1,700 kg), although there may be some confusion, as the stone was not a standardised weight at the time. Whilst his size and weight partially account for the admiration he attracted, he was also regarded as a particularly fine and well-proportioned example of his type, at a time when the concept of selective breeding for specific characteristics was becoming established in agriculture.

On show in Oxford during February 1807, the ox damaged his hip as he was being brought out of his carriage. The injury failed to heal and on 15 April 1807 he was slaughtered. His weight after death was reported to be 189 st (2,650 lb; 1,200 kg).

== In popular culture ==
The ox was painted by various artists during his lifetime and pictures of him were reproduced and sold commercially. A coloured engraving after John Boultbee's picture of 1802 sold 2,000 prints in that year alone. China and porcelain were decorated with pictures of the ox, including a range of blue and white Staffordshire pottery. The impact made by the Durham Ox is reflected in the large number of British pubs named after him, and the town named after him: Durham Ox in Victoria, Australia.

== See also ==
- Craven Heifer
