= Dishley Leicester =

Extinct British breed of sheep

- Conservation status: extinct
- Country of origin: United Kingdom

The Dishley Leicester or New Leicester was a British breed of sheep. It was bred in the late eighteenth century by Robert Bakewell at Dishley Grange in Leicestershire and was highly influential in the development of sheep-breeding in the United Kingdom, in France and elsewhere. It no longer exists as a distinct breed; the Bluefaced Leicester, the Border Leicester, the Leicester Longwool and the Wensleydale all derive directly from it.
