= Whitebred Shorthorn =

Breed of cattle

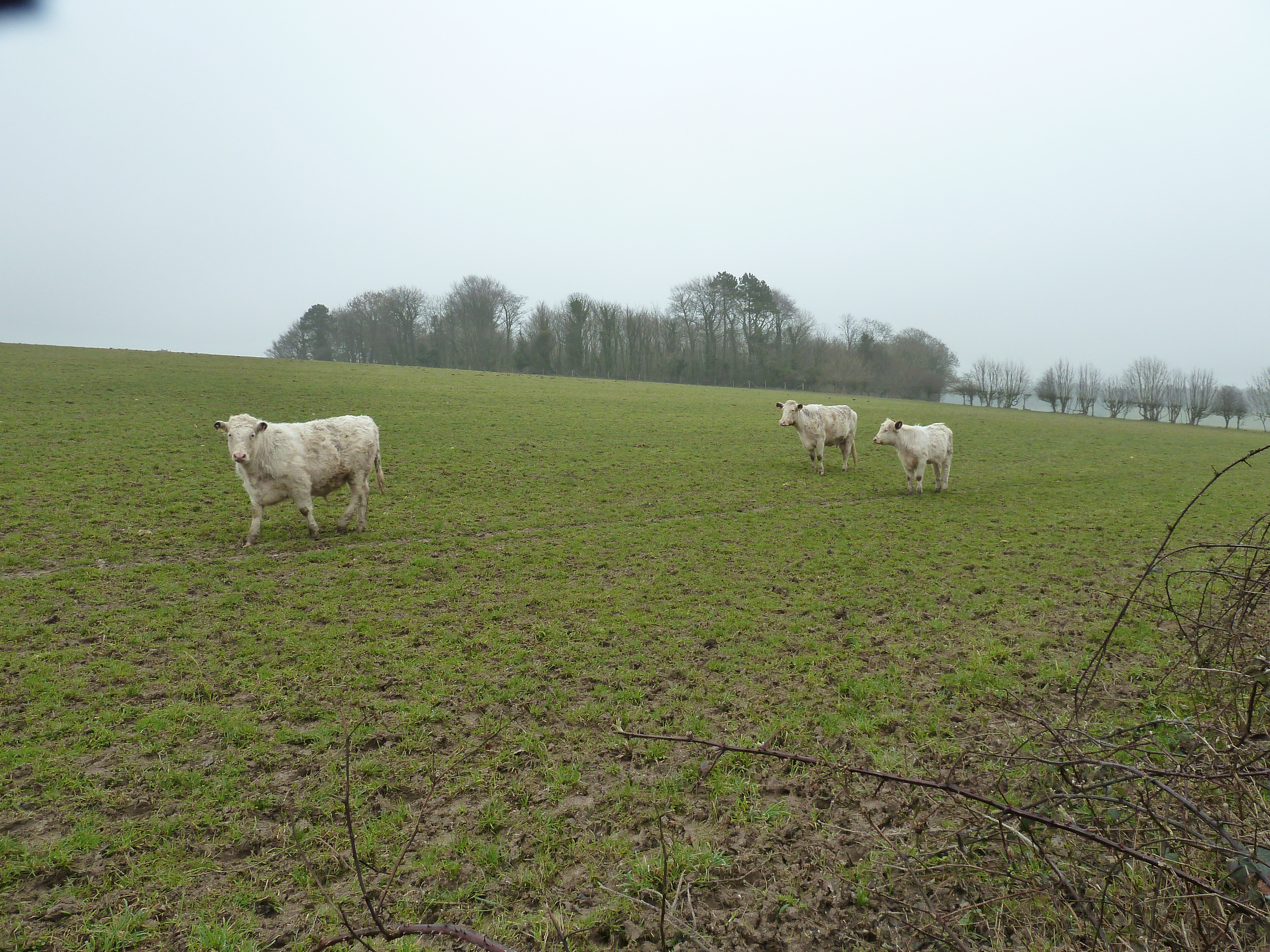

Whitebred Shorthorn is a British type of beef cattle originating in north west England and south west Scotland. It is derived from Shorthorn cattle, but is always white, rather than being the range of colours found in other Shorthorns. It has not undergone the specialisation seen in other Shorthorns (Beef Shorthorn and Dairy Shorthorn), and so it remains as a more traditional hardy and thrifty cattle type. This favours its use for conservation grazing of hill pastures, grazing rank grass species to maintain a diverse flora.

== Uses ==
The Whitebred Shorthorn was developed to provide white Shorthorn bulls for crossing with black Galloway cows. The offspring of this cross form a popular type, the Blue Grey, which has useful characteristics of both parents, and an intermediate blue roan colour. As this colour does not consistently breed true, Blue Greys are normally produced each generation from the parent breeds.

== Breed history ==
While the exact origin is unknown the breed came to be noticed in the late nineteenth century when it was known as the Cumberland White. At that time Mr David Hall of Larriston, Newcastleton, Roxburghshire, and Mr Andrew Park of Stelshaw, Bailey, Cumberland sold Blue-grey suckled calves at Newcastleton suckler sales. Numbers of Whitebred cattle, mainly bulls for cross breeding, increased after about 1900, until a separate day was needed at the Newcastleton auctions. The Whitebred Shorthorn Association was formed on 12 March 1962 by a meeting of almost 200 breeders. In the autumn of 1964 official breed society sales were held at Newcastleton and Bellingham and there was another successful Newcastleton sale in 1965. In that year the first sale of Whitebreds in Carlisle was held at Botchersgate Mart. Breed association sales continue to be held in Carlisle, in spring and autumn, although numbers sold are now in single figures.
