= List of shipwrecks in December 1884 =

The list of shipwrecks in December 1884 includes ships sunk, foundered, grounded, or otherwise lost during December 1884.

== 1 December ==
List of shipwrecks: 1 December 1884
Ship	State	Description
Annie, and Don	United Kingdom	The steamships collided at Hull, Yorkshire and were both severely damaged. They both put in to Hull. Annie was on a voyage from Dunkirk, Nord, France to Goole, Yorkshire. Don was on a voyage from Hull to London.
Berengaria	United Kingdom	The barque struck on the Galloper Sand in the North Sea, floated off, then sank in deep water nearer to the coast of Essex. 18 crew survived in two boats, but master, pilot and 10 crew were lost. She was on a voyage from Melbourne, Victoria and Falmouth, Cornwall to Sunderland, County Durham.
Ethiopia	United Kingdom	The schooner ran aground on the North Rock, off the coast of County Down and was abandoned by her crew. She was refloated.
Niobe, and Stokesby	United Kingdom	The steamships collided in the Seine and were both severely damaged. Niobe became waterlogged. Stokesby put in to Rouen, Seine-Inférieure, France.
Ocean Belle	United Kingdom	The brig was driven ashore at Saltfleet, Lincolnshire. She was on a voyage from Queenstown, County Cork to Goole.
Ommelande	United Kingdom	The brigantine was driven ashore at Dover, Kent. She was on a voyage from Sunderland, County Durham to Southampton, Hampshire. She was refloated with the assistance of a tug and taken in to Dover.
Silverdale	United Kingdom	The steamship ran aground in the Elbe.

== 2 December ==
List of shipwrecks: 2 December 1884
Ship	State	Description
Mary Joseph	Flag unknown	The schooner foundered with the loss of all on board. She was on a voyage from Cape Breton Island, Nova Scotia, Canada to the Newfoundland Colony.

== 4 December ==
List of shipwrecks: 4 December 1884
Ship	State	Description
Alliance	United Kingdom	The steamship foundered off Boscastle, Cornwall with the loss of all sixteen crew. She was on a voyage from Cardiff, Glamorgan to Saint-Malo, Ille-et-Vilaine, France.

== 5 December ==
List of shipwrecks: 5 December 1884
Ship	State	Description
Josephine	United States	The schooner was lost on Little Boar's Head, New Hampshire. Her crew were rescued.

== 6 December ==
List of shipwrecks: 6 December 1884
Ship	State	Description
Bengore Head	United Kingdom	The steamship was damaged by fire at Hull, Yorkshire. The fire was extinguished the next day.

== 7 December ==
List of shipwrecks: 7 December 1884
Ship	State	Description
Cito	United Kingdom	The schooner was driven ashore on Skagen. She was on a voyage from Kennetpans, Clackmannanshire, United Kingdom to Assens.
Demetrius	United Kingdom	The steamship, anchored at Maassluis, South Holland, Netherlands, was run into by the steamship Albula (United Kingdom) and sank. Her crew were rescued. Demetrius was on a voyage from Rotterdam, South Holland to London; Albula was from Kerch, Russia, for Rotterdam.
Pochard	United Kingdom	The steamship foundered in a heavy gale 1 nautical mile (1.9 km) off Holyhead, Anglesey with the loss of all 24 crew. She was on a voyage from Liverpool, Lancashire to Amsterdam, Netherlands. The Inquiry concluded that, for reasons unknown, the ship had turned back and was heading slowly for Holyhead when she suddenly sank by the stern.

== 8 December ==
List of shipwrecks: 8 December 1884
Ship	State	Description
Chalclope	United Kingdom	The brigantine was driven ashore and wrecked in Bideford Bay. Her crew were rescued. She was on a voyage from A Coruña, Spain to Cardiff, Glamorgan.

== 9 December ==
List of shipwrecks: 9 December 1884
Ship	State	Description
Oak	United Kingdom	The brig was driven ashore at Wells-next-the-Sea, Norfolk. She was on a voyage from Sunderland, County Durham to London.
Spearman, and Yourri	United Kingdom; Russia	The steamships collided in the Danube. Spearman was severely damaged. She was on a voyage from Sulina to Galaţi, Romania. Yourri sank with the loss of three lives. She was on a voyage from "Sistori" to Odesa.
Wilton	United Kingdom	The steamship was damaged by a cargo fire after loading at Savannah, Georgia, United States.

== 10 December ==
List of shipwrecks: 10 December 1884
Ship	State	Description
Carita	Canada	The brigantine was run into by County of Cardigan (United Kingdom) 30 nautical miles (56 km) off the Galloper Lightship ( Trinity House). Two of her crew were rescued by the smack Dart (United Kingdom). Carita was on a voyage from Hamburg, Germany to Cartagena, Spain. She was subsequently taken in tow by two smacks.
City of Augusta	United States	The steamship was slightly damaged by major fire in the wool cargo at Savannah, Georgia, reported locally on 10 December.
Princess of Wales	United Kingdom	The ship was abandoned in the North Sea. She was on a voyage from Fredrikstadt, Denmark to Newry, County Antrim.

== 11 December ==
List of shipwrecks: 11 December 1884
Ship	State	Description
Escombrera	United Kingdom	The ship departed from Benisaf, Algeria for Maryport, Cumberland. No further trace, reported overdue.
Rohl	Denmark	The schooner was driven ashore near Gullane, Lothian, United Kingdom. She was refloated on 13 December and towed to Leith, leaking badly and with a broken mast.

== 12 December ==
List of shipwrecks: 12 December 1884
Ship	State	Description
Iberian	United Kingdom	The steamship was damaged by fire at Liverpool, Lancashire.

== 13 December ==
List of shipwrecks: 13 December 1884
Ship	State	Description
Energy	United Kingdom	The fishing smack was run down and sunk while anchored off the Maplin Sands, off the coast of Essex, by the steamship John Johnasson (United Kingdom).

== 15 December ==
List of shipwrecks: 15 December 1884
Ship	State	Description
Hildegarde	United States	The schooner was lost on Little River Island, Maine. Her crew were rescued.
Sarah Scott	United Kingdom	The barque departed from Middlesbrough, Yorkshire for Buenos Aires, Argentina. She subsequently foundered in the Boston Deeps with the loss of all sixteen crew. Wreckage from the ship washed up on the Norfolk coast.

== 16 December ==
List of shipwrecks: 16 December 1884
Ship	State	Description
Edendale	United Kingdom	The steamship sank in Havre roads, after being run down by the steamship Linda (Italy) on a voyage from the River Tyne or Cardiff to Rouen, France with coal. Her crew were rescued from the ship's boat by a fishing boat.
Mabel	United Kingdom	The schooner was driven ashore in Portland Bay.

== 17 December ==
List of shipwrecks: 17 December 1884
Ship	State	Description
Colomba	France	The Marseille-registered steamship ran ashore at Deal, Kent, United Kingdom. She was on a voyage from London, United Kingdom to Bordeaux, Gironde, France. She was towed off on 19 December.
Uva	United Kingdom	The steamship departed from Liverpool, Lancashire for Barcelona, Spain. No further trace, reported overdue.

== 18 December ==
List of shipwrecks: 18 December 1884
Ship	State	Description
Cloud	United Kingdom	The trawl boat was run into by the trawl boat Susanna and sank off Skerries, County Dublin. Her crew survived.
Jersey City	United Kingdom	The steamship ran aground in the River Avon. She was on a voyage from New York, United States to Bristol, Gloucestershire. She was refloated but then collided with the steamship Rambler (United Kingdom) as she was being taken in to Bristol.
Ventnor	United Kingdom	The steam fishing vessel was driven ashore at Redcar, Yorkshire.

== 19 December ==
List of shipwrecks: 19 December 1884
Ship	State	Description
Uva	United Kingdom	The steamship was sighted off Point Lynas, Anglesey whilst on a voyage from Liverpool, Lancashire to Barcelona, Spain. No further trace, presumed foundered off the English coast the following day with the loss of all hands.

== 20 December ==
List of shipwrecks: 20 December 1884
Ship	State	Description
Echo	United Kingdom	The dandy-cutter was wrecked on the Gaoler Rocks, off La Corbière, Jersey, Channel Islands with the loss of all fifteen people on board. She was on a voyage from Saint-Malo, Ille-et-Vilaine, France to Guernsey, Channel Islands.
Ipswich, and Stanton	United Kingdom	The steamship Stanton was run into by the steamship Ipswich and sank at Vlissingen, Zeeland, Netherlands with the loss of two of her crew. Ipswich was severely damaged. She put back to Antwerp, Belgium.
Unknown	French Navy	A torpedo boat struck a sunken rock and sank at Toulon, Var. Her crew were rescued.

== 21 December ==
List of shipwrecks: 21 December 1884
Ship	State	Description
St. Peter	United States	The schooner ran aground in a snowstorm off Portsmouth, New Hampshire. The vessel slid off and sank in four fathoms (24 ft; 7.3 m) of water four hours later. Her crew were rescued by the schooner Lizzie A. Robbey (United States).
Surrey	United Kingdom	The steamship was driven ashore and wrecked on Texel, North Holland, Netherlands. Her crew were rescued. She was on a voyage from a Baltic port to Antwerp, Belgium.

== 22 December ==
List of shipwrecks: 22 December 1884
Ship	State	Description
Asa	Italy	The barque collided with the steamship Creaden (United Kingdom) at Cardiff, Glamorgan, United Kingdom and was severely damaged. She put back to Cardiff in a severely leaky condition and was placed under repair.
Christopher Columbus, Creaden, and Garston	Italy; United Kingdom; United Kingdom	The steamship Creaden collided with the full-rigged ship Garston at Cardiff and both ran ashore. Garson was then run into by the barque Christopher Columbus before she was refloated. Christopher Columbus was on a voyage from Cardiff to Genoa. She was severely damaged and put back to Cardiff for repairs.
County of Aberdeen	United Kingdom	The ship departed from Cardiff for Bombay, India. No further trace, reported missing.
Edward Haskell	United States	The schooner ran aground at Cape Canso, Nova Scotia, Canada. Her crew landed on an uninhabited island, from which they were rescued the next day.
Hope	(United Kingdom of Great Britain and Ireland) Guernsey	The schooner foundered in the North Sea with the loss of one of her crew.
Jessie McLellan	United Kingdom	The schooner struck the Mucks rocks about 1nm off Buckie, Scotland and sank in deep water (Shields, Tyne and Wear for Buckie, with coal). The crew of two escaped in the ship's boat.
Oliveto	United Kingdom	The steamship was driven ashore on Long Island, New York, United States. She was on a voyage from South Shields, County Durham to New York City, United States.
Redesdale	United Kingdom	The steamship was stranded on the Pearl Rock, near Gibraltar and sank. Her crew were rescued. She was on a voyage from Alexandria, Egypt to Sharpness, Gloucestershire
Warren Sawyer	United States	The schooner ran aground at Nantucket, Massachusetts, United States. Her crew were rescued.

== 23 December ==
List of shipwrecks: 23 December 1884
Ship	State	Description
Athenian	United Kingdom	The ship ran aground on the Stony Binks, at the mouth of the Humber. She was on a voyage from Brevig, Norway to Grimsby, Lincolnshire.
Charlie Hickman	Canada	The barque went ashore at Moriches, New York, United States and became a total wreck with the loss of a crew member. She was on a voyage from Liverpool, Lancashire, United Kingdom to New York City, United States.
Eeta	United Kingdom	The barque departed from Mauritius for Adelaide, South Australia with sugar on 23 December. No further trace and posted as missing on 15 April 1885.
Mary Ann	United Kingdom	The Mersey Flat collided with the schooner Maggie A. (United Kingdom) and sank in the River Mersey upstream of New Ferry, Cheshire.
Reno	Austria-Hungary	The barque ran aground on the Owers Sandbank, in the English Channel off the coast of Sussex. She was on a voyage from Newcastle upon Tyne, Northumberland, United Kingdom to Buenos Aires, Argentina. She was refloated and put in to Portsmouth, Hampshire, United Kingdom in a leaky condition.
Selembria	United Kingdom	The steamship ran aground in the Suez Canal at Ismalia, Egypt. She was on a voyage from Singapore, Straits Settlements to London.

== 25 December ==
List of shipwrecks: 25 December 1884
Ship	State	Description
Ann	United Kingdom	The ship was wrecked on the Tarlair Rocks, on the coast of Aberdeenshire with the loss of all three crew.
Chelydra, and Holmestrand	United Kingdom; Norway	The steamship Chelydra was run into by the barque Holmestrand off the Eddystone Rocks, Cornwall and both vessels sank. Chelydra's crew took to the boats and landed at Plymouth, Devon. Holmstrand's crew were rescued by the steamship Llanthewy (United Kingdom).
Cheseboro	United States	The full-rigged ship was driven ashore in the Columbia River. She was refloated.
Dieke Rickmers	Germany	The barque ran aground on the Longsand, in the North Sea off the coast of Essex, United Kingdom. The crew of 25 and a large dog were rescued by the RNLI lifeboat Honourable Artillery Company (ON 31) from Walton-on-the-Naze.
Fairport	United Kingdom	The steamship struck rocks off St Sampson's, Guernsey, Channel Islands, when sailing for London.
Lointy	United Kingdom	The ship collided with Cornwall (United Kingdom) and sank and New York, United States. Her crew survived. Lointy was on a voyage from New York to Bombay, India.
Raisby	Hong Kong	The steamship was driven ashore at Azalia Point, Perim Island, Aden Settlement. Her passengers were taken off. She was on a voyage from Hong Kong to New York, United States.
Sea	United Kingdom	The schooner collided with the steamship Gallia (United Kingdom) and sank in the River Mersey at New Brighton, Cheshire. Her crew were rescued.

== 26 December ==
List of shipwrecks: 26 December 1884
Ship	State	Description
Adrian Smith	United Kingdom	The steamship ran ashore 2 nautical miles (3.7 km) west of Kirkcaldy, Fife. Her crew were rescued. She was on a voyage from Kirkcaldy to London or vice versa.
Anna	Germany	The brig sprang a leak and sank in the Bay of Biscay. Her crew were rescued by Northumbria (United Kingdom).
SMS Marie	Imperial German Navy	The Carola-class corvette ran aground on a reef off Neu Mecklenburg, German New Guinea and was severely damaged. She was refloated on 29 December and put into Nusa, German New Guinea for repairs.

== 29 December ==
List of shipwrecks: 29 December 1884
Ship	State	Description
Crystal Palace, and Emma Grace	United Kingdom	The ships ran aground on the Perils Bank and then collided with each other. Crystal Palace was on a voyage from Charlestown, Cornwall to Runcorn, Cheshire. Emma Grace was on a voyage from Fowey, Cornwall to Runcorn.

== Unknown date ==
List of shipwrecks: Unknown date in December 1884
Ship	State	Description
E. W. Stetson	United States	The full-rigged ship went ashore at Sandy Point. She was on a voyage from Bremen, Germany to New York City.
Fidelity	United Kingdom	The schooner collided with Frederick Vlaminde (Flag unknown) at Leven, Fife and ran aground.
Fluellin	United Kingdom	The barque was destroyed by fire at sea. Her crew were rescued. She was on a voyage from Sunderland, County Durham to Bahia, Brazil.
Freia	Norway	The clipper was driven ashore and wrecked in the Koster Islands, Sweden with the loss of all hands. She was on a voyage from North Shields, Northumberland, United Kingdom to Vrengen.
George	United Kingdom	The trow was run into by Kilbrannan (United Kingdom) and sank at Cardiff, Glamorgan.
Isabella	United Kingdom	The schooner was driven ashore at Covehithe, Suffolk. Her six crew were rescued by rocket apparatus. She was on a voyage from London to Middlesbrough, Yorkshire.
J. J. B.	United Kingdom	The ship was driven ashore at "Santonio", Brazil. She was on a voyage from Bahia to Antwerp, Belgium.
Kate	United Kingdom	The Mersey Flat was run down and sunk in the River Mersey by the steamship Dollie (United Kingdom). Her crew were rescued.
L. C. W.	United Kingdom	The fishing boat was run down and sunk in the English Channel off the coast of Devon on or after 23 December.
Louise	United Kingdom	The brigantine was driven ashore at Courselles, Calvados, France.
Nina Seconda	Italy	The ship was driven ashore in the Schuylkill River. She was on a voyage from Philadelphia, Pennsylvania, United States to Newry, County Antrim, United Kingdom.
Nuovo Fama	Austria-Hungary	The barque was wrecked. She was on a voyage from the River Plate to the English Channel.
Ohio	United States	The full-rigged ship was destroyed by fire in the harbour at Greenport, New York.
Père Jacques	France	The ship was driven ashore and wrecked at Saint-Pierre, Saint Pierre and Miquelon. Her crew were rescued. She was on a voyage from Martinique to Saint-Pierre.
Queen of Mistley	United Kingdom	The schooner ran aground at Poole, Dorset.
Rusoer	Norway	The barque ran aground on the Leman Sand, in the North Sea. She was on a voyage from South Shields, County Durham to Saint Croix. She was refloated and put in to Grimsby, Lincolnshire, United Kingdom in a leaky condition.
Sapphire	United Kingdom	The steamship sank in the Nieuwe Diep. She was on a voyage from New Orleans, Louisiana, United States to Bremen.
Sarah Carney	United Kingdom	The brigantine was wrecked in the Caicos Islands. Her crew were rescued. She was on a voyage from Halifax, Nova Scotia, Canada to Kingston, Jamaica.
Spanker	United Kingdom	The barque ran aground on a reef off the coast of Cuba. She was on a voyage from Jamaica to Queenstown, County Cork. She was refloated and resumed her voyage.
Victoria	France	The steamship was wrecked at Mundaca, Spain. Her crew were rescued.
Ville de Marseille	France	The ship was driven ashore at Pointe-à-Pitre, Haiti.
Yorktown	United States	The ship ran aground at New York City. She was on a voyage from New York City to New Orleans, Louisiana, United States. She was refloated and put back to New York City in a leaky condition.
Zephyr	France	The ship struck a sunken rock and sank at Marseille, Bouches-du-Rhône with the loss of three of her crew. She was on a voyage from Cardiff to Marseille.
Unknown junks	Japan	An estimated 112 junks were destroyed in a typhoon.
