= Leicester Longwool =

British breed of sheep

- At the Great Yorkshire Show in 2011

- Conservation status: FAO (2007): not at risk; DAD-IS (2026): at risk/endangered; RBST (2026): priority; Livestock Conservancy (2026): threatened
- Other names: English Leicester
- Country of origin: United Kingdom
- Standard: Leicester Longwool Sheep Breeders Association
- Use: dual-purpose, meat and wool

Traits
- Weight: Male: 100–150 kg; Female: 80–100 kg
- Wool colour: white
- Face colour: white
- Horn status: polled

The Leicester Longwool is a British breed of sheep. It derives from the Dishley Leicester bred in the late eighteenth century by Robert Bakewell, but was not bred by him. During the nineteenth century it was exported to several countries, among them Australia, New Zealand and the United States. In Australia and New Zealand it is known as the English Leicester.

In the twenty-first century it is an endangered breed, with fewer than 600 head in the United Kingdom and an estimated total population world-wide of 1683. It is listed by the Rare Breeds Survival Trust as 'priority', the highest level of concern of the trust.

== History ==
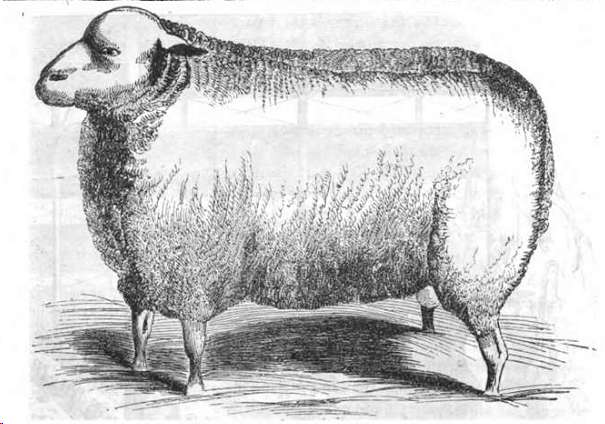
Leicester ram at the 1843 Royal Agricultural Show in Derby

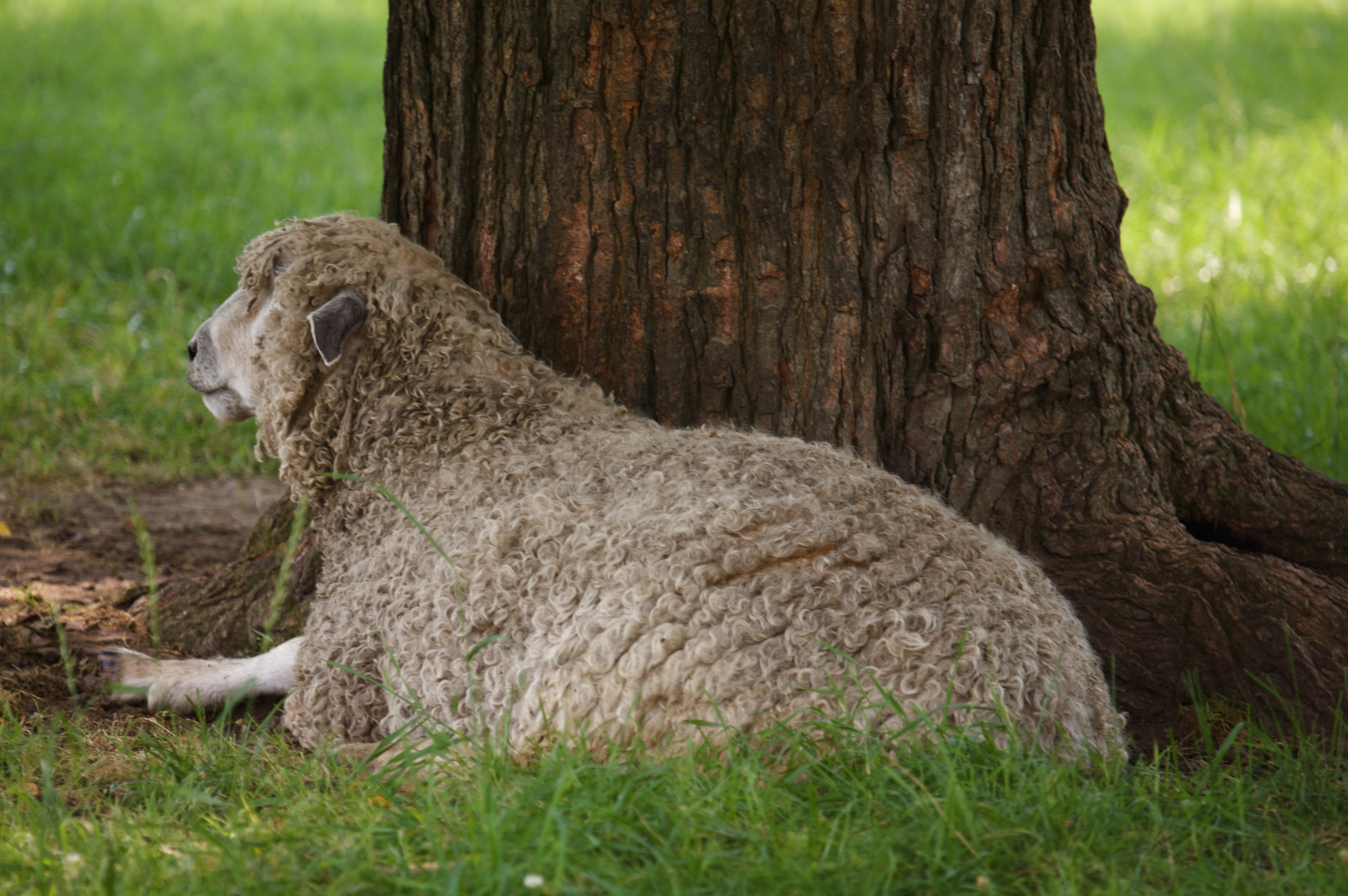
At Colonial Williamsburg in Virginia, in the United States

The Leicester Longwool – like the Bluefaced Leicester and the Border Leicester – derives from the Dishley Leicester bred in the late eighteenth century by Robert Bakewell of Dishley Grange, near Loughborough in Leicestershire.

The Leicester Longwool in the 1700s was slow-growing and coarsely boned. They now have been developed to gain weight quickly and are fast-growing. Leicester Longwool was one of the first pure sheep breeds introduced to Australia, having been introduced in 1826.

The sheep were much used for cross-breeding with local sheep in North America in the nineteenth century. In the twentieth century Merinos were more widely chosen for this purpose and the Leicester population dwindled; by the 1930s it was extinct or close to extinction on the continent. It was re-introduced in 1990 when a conservation flock was established by the Colonial Williamsburg Foundation with foundation stock imported from Australia.

== Characteristics ==
The head of an Leicester Longwool should be carried well, not too high and should have no signs of horns on the poll (forehead). The face is generally in a wedge shape, covered in white hairs and can appear to have a blue tinge. The lips and nostrils should be black. Having black specks on the face and ears is not objectionable. The neck should be of medium length. The shoulders should be strong and level with the back, which should be flat. The legs should be straight and wide apart and the hooves should be black.

The fleece should be dense (having thick and blocky clumps of wool also known as the staple). It should be lustrous, indicating the shine on the wool, and should have a well-defined crimp or wave from skin to tip. The common fibre diameter for an Leicester Longwool is 32 to 38 micrometres (microns).
