= Dairy Shorthorn =

British breed of dairy cattle

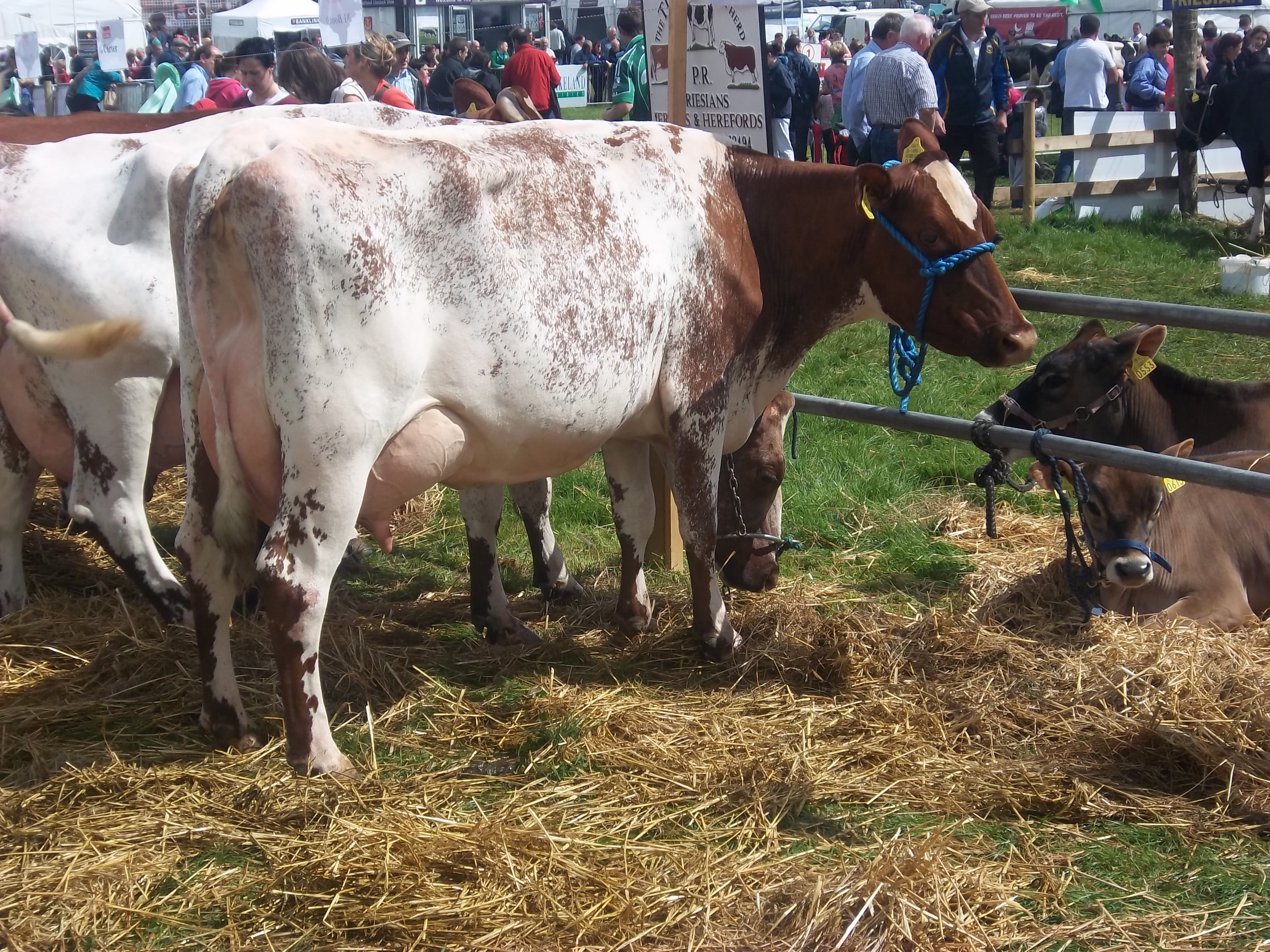
- A cow at the Tullamore Show in Ireland
- Conservation status: FAO (2007): not listed; DAD-IS (2021): critical; RBST (2021–2022): priority
- Other names: Milking Shorthorn; Durham; Teeswater
- Country of origin: United Kingdom

Traits
- Weight: Male: 990 kg; Female: 640–680 kg
- Height: Male: 143 cm; Female: average 140 cm
- Coat: red, red-and-white, roan or white
- Cattle; Bos (primigenius) taurus

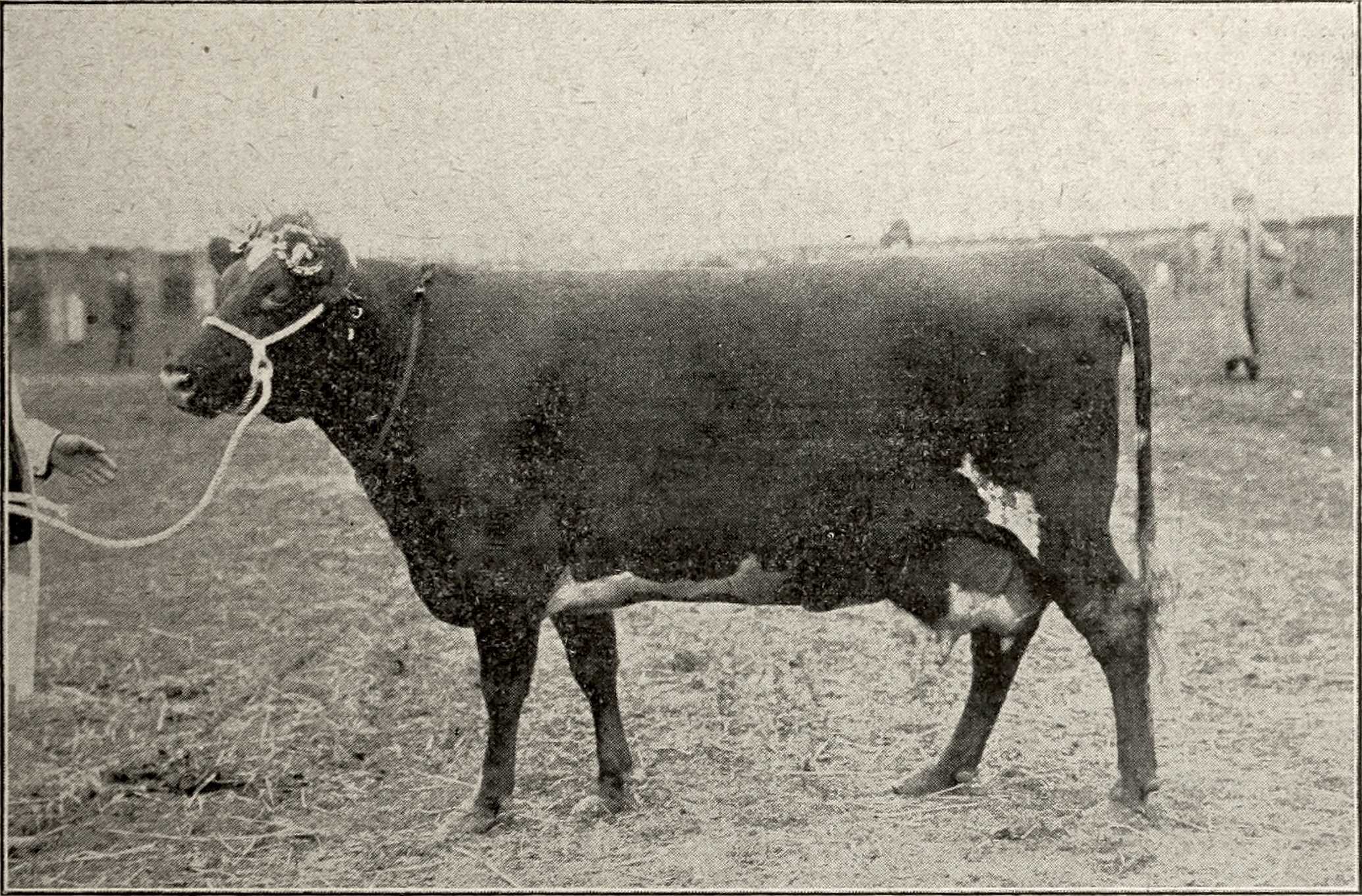
Priceless Princess, winner of first prize for Dairy Shorthorns at the National Dairy Show of 1907

The Dairy Shorthorn is a British breed of dairy cattle. It derives from the Shorthorn cattle of Teesside, in the North Riding of Yorkshire and in Northumbria (now divided between County Durham and Northumberland) in north-eastern England. The Dairy Shorthorn was for this reason at first known as the Durham or Teeswater.

Selective breeding for a dairy type began in the late eighteenth century. This is known as the Dairy Shorthorn in the United Kingdom, Ireland, Australia and South Africa, and as the Milking Shorthorn in New Zealand. The Milking Shorthorn of Canada and the United States shares the origins of the Dairy Shorthorn, but has developed in a different way. The Illawarra Shorthorn of Australia is largely descended from the Dairy Shorthorn.

Worldwide, the conservation status of the Dairy Shorthorn, the Illawarra Shorthorn and the Milking Shorthorn is "not at risk". In the United Kingdom the small remainder of the breed not affected by indiscriminate cross-breeding in the twentieth century is known as the Dairy Shorthorn (Original Population). It is critically endangered. Both it and the Northern Dairy Shorthorn are listed as "priority" – the highest category of risk – on the watchlist of the Rare Breeds Survival Trust.

== History ==
Short-horned cattle of good quality are documented on the Yorkshire estates of the Dukes and Earls of Northumberland in the late sixteenth century. The first significant attempts at selective breeding of these cattle were made by Charles and Robert Colling in County Durham, who based their work on that of Robert Bakewell of Dishley, in Leicestershire. The principal work of selection for dairy qualities in the Durham/Shorthorn was done in the early nineteenth century by Thomas Bates of Kirklevington (now in Stockton-on-Tees, North Yorkshire), building principally on stock bought from the Colling brothers. A herd-book for all types of Shorthorn cattle – the Coates Herd Book – was begun by George Coates in 1822, and initially listed 850 cows and 710 bulls; (Note: It is sometimes claimed that this is the "oldest" or "first" cattle herd-book; elsewhere it is suggested that the first cattle herd-book is that kept for the Braunvieh by the monks of the Monastery of Einsiedeln in Switzerland from 1775 to 1782.) it was later taken over by the breed society, the Shorthorn Society of Great Britain and Ireland, which was formed in 1874. Thomas Bates's herd was auctioned off piecemeal in 1850, which led to an expansion of interest in cattle of this type. For the next hundred years the Shorthorn held a dominant position in British agriculture: in 1937–1938, just before the outbreak of the Second World War, the number of Shorthorn bulls registered with the Ministry of Agriculture and Fisheries was 23730, not far from double the number of all registered bulls of other cattle breeds (12917). Breed numbers reached a peak in 1949, after which increasing competition from the Friesian caused them to decline rapidly. The number of registered bulls, already much lower than before the war at about 35% of the national total in 1949, fell to little over 10% in 1960. Separate sections for beef and dairy strains within the Shorthorn breed were created in 1958.

In 1969 the breed society approved a programme of cross-breeding of the Dairy Shorthorn with a variety of other European breeds. Initially these were the Danish Red, the Meuse-Rhine-Yssel, the Red Friesian, the Red Holstein and the Simmental; later, introgression from Angeln, Ayrshire, Norwegian Red and Swedish Red-and-White was also permitted, as was the use of any bull that the Society had approved. Animals with no more than 25% Shorthorn heritage could be registered in the Dairy Shorthorn herd-book. The programme led to the development of a new composite breed, the Blended Red-and-White Shorthorn. It also led to the virtual extinction of the Dairy Shorthorn: by about 2009 there fewer than 100 breeding cows, and by 2012 there were no more than 50; in that year six purebred calves were added to the herd-book. The remnants of the breed were renamed to Dairy Shorthorn (Original Population) It is a critically endangered breed; both it and the Northern Dairy Shorthorn are listed as "priority" – the highest category of risk – on the watchlist of the Rare Breeds Survival Trust.

Shorthorns were exported to Maryland and Virginia in the United States from 1783, and in the early nineteenth century expanded into Kentucky, New York, Ohio and the Midwest. These developed into a separate population, the North American Milking Shorthorn. No population data for the United States has been reported to DAD-IS since 2013, when there were just under 2800 head; in Canada the total number reported for 2022 was 182, and the conservation status of the breed was listed in DAD-IS as "at risk/critical".

The first dairy cows imported into New Zealand were Shorthorns, when in 1814, they were shipped from New South Wales. Shorthorns were used as draught animals in bullock teams, were good milkers and provided good meat. Shorthorn herds were established by the early 1840s, and for a long time Shorthorns were New Zealand's most popular cattle breed.

The Dairy Shorthorn has contributed to the development of other dairy breeds, including the Swedish Red Pied and the Illawarra Shorthorn of Australia.

== Characteristics ==
The traditional Dairy Shorthorn is of medium size: the average height at the withers of mature cows is about 140 cm, and body weights usually lie in the range 640 to 680 kg.

=== Original strains ===
A small number cattle relatively little affected by cross-breeding remain, and are listed as the Dairy Shorthorn (Original Population) in the United Kingdom. The former Dairy Shorthorn population in Australia was reported as extinct in 2022. These cattle are more suited to beef production than the modern Dairy Shorthorn, and so may be known as Dual-purpose Shorthorns.

== Use ==
The milk yield averages approximately 7000 kg in a lactation of 305 days, with some 3.5%–4.0% milk-fat and 3.0%–3.5% protein.
