= John Whessell =

British engraver and painter

- Born: c. 1760; England
- Occupations: Engraver and painter

John Whessell (born c. 1760) was a British engraver and painter.

== Gallery ==
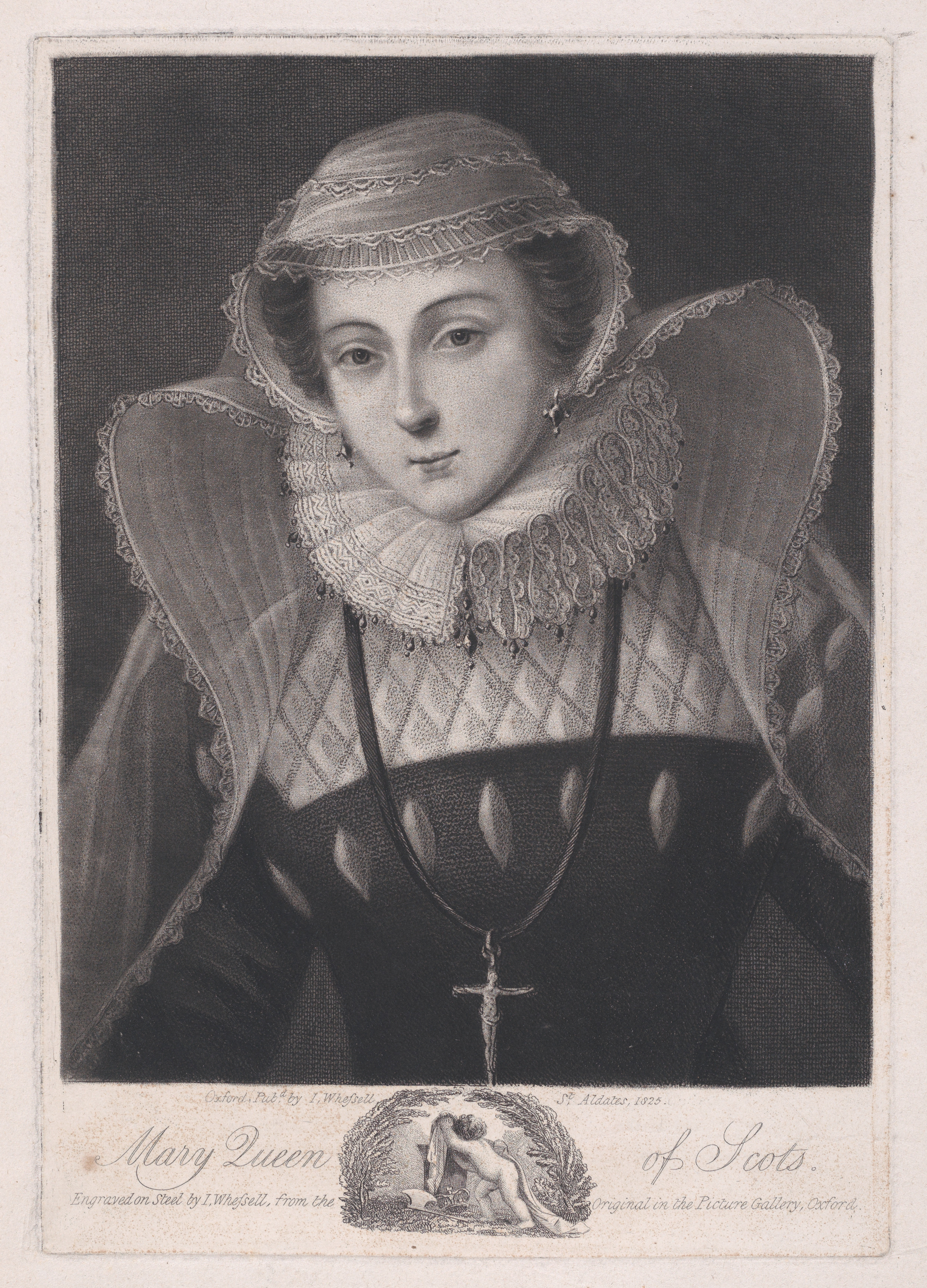
Mary, Queen of Scots

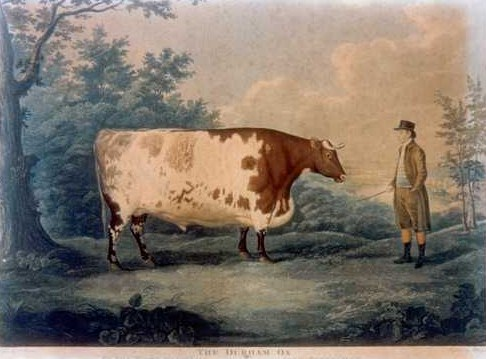
Durham Ox

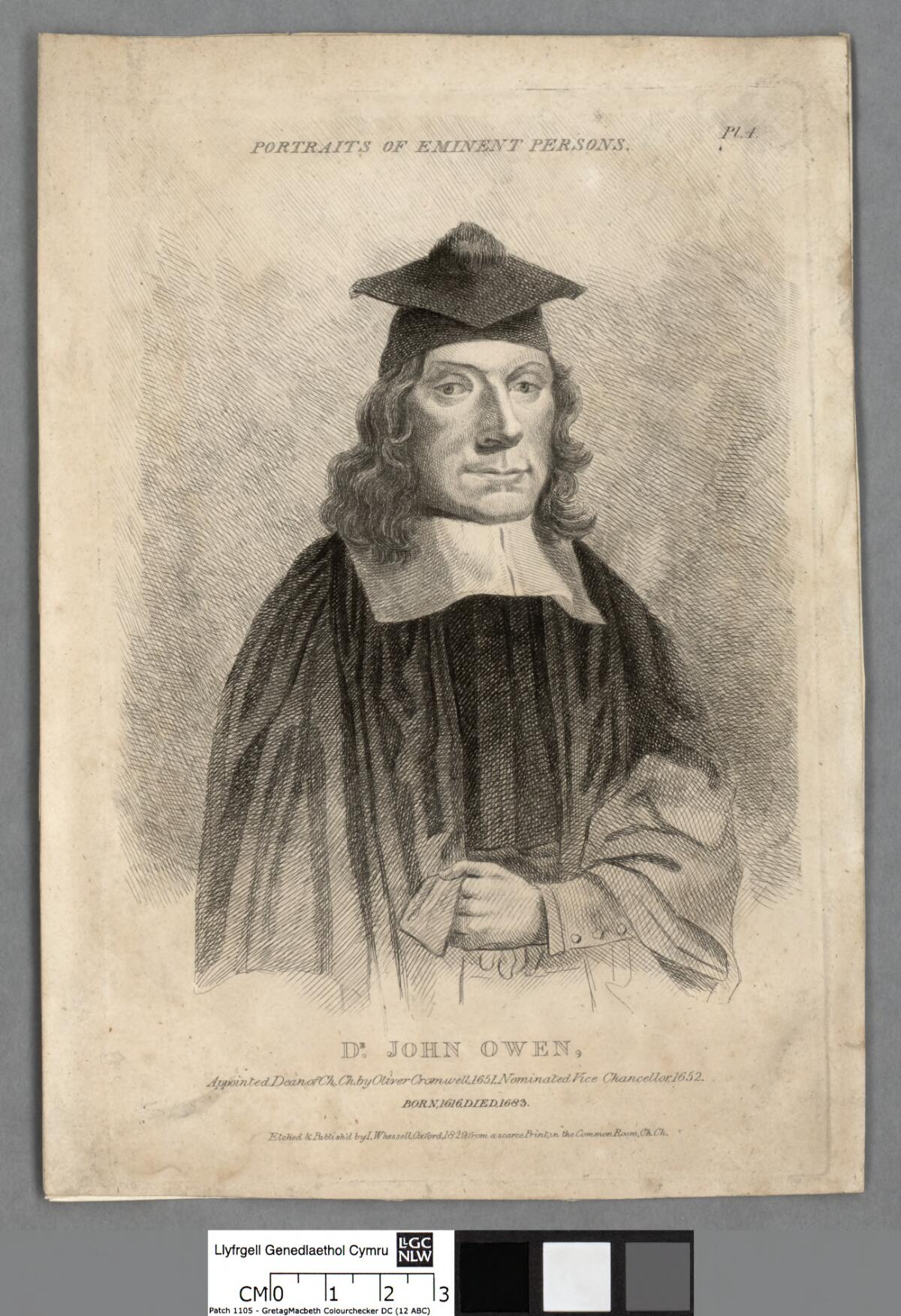
John Owen

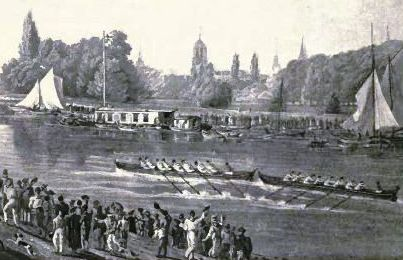
The Eights

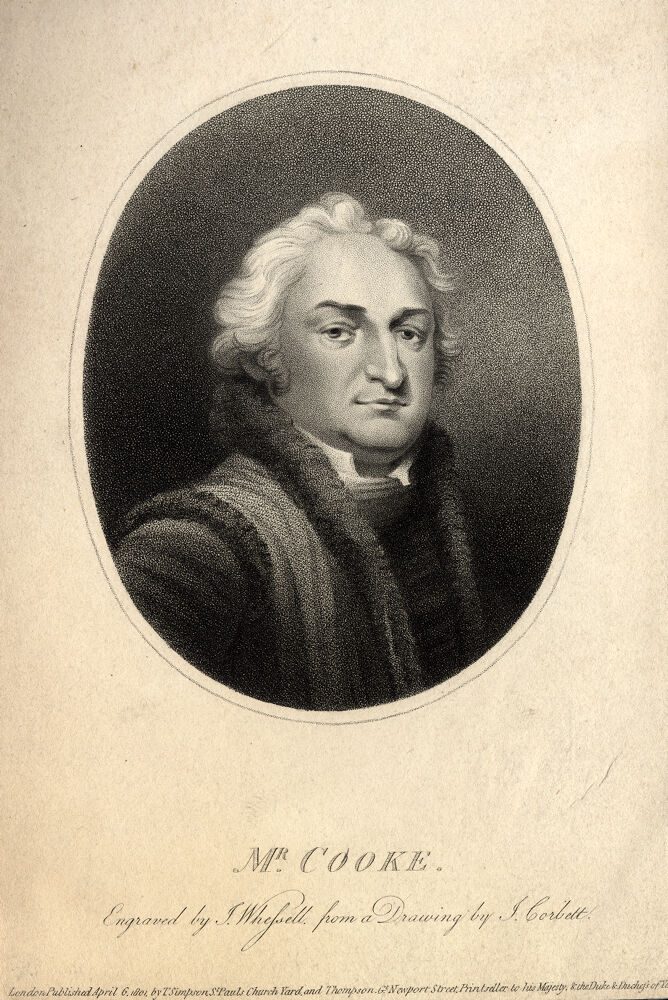
George Frederick Cooke
