= Robert Colling =

British farmer and cattle breeder (1749–1820)

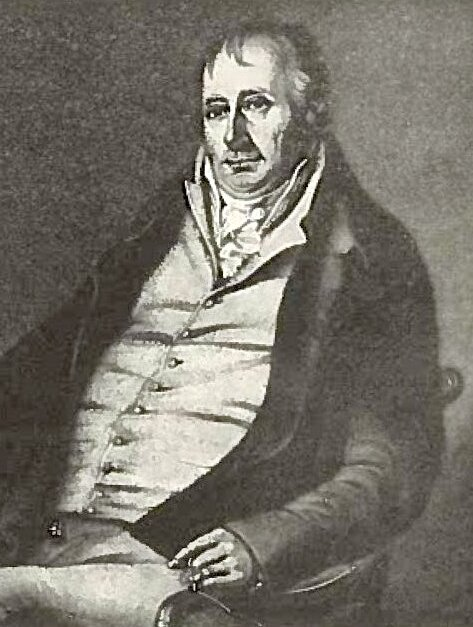
Colling in the Society's Journal for 1899

Robert Colling (1749 – 7 March 1820), was an English stock breeder. He, along with his brother Charles, was famous for his improvement of the Shorthorn breed of cows.

== Life ==
He was the eldest son of Charles Colling of Ketton, near Darlington, and brother of Charles Colling. After receiving "an ordinary education", he was apprenticed to a grocer in Shields; but "not having his health" he came home to his father's farm and commenced an agricultural career. After spending some time at Hurworth, he entered on a farm at Barmpton, under the Lambton family. He had then "no thought of becoming a breeder of shorthorns, and only kept dairy cows".

The foundation of his pedigree herd was a yellow-red and white bull, originally bought on the advice of his brother Charles for eight guineas, and afterwards sold to his brother for the Ketton herd (known in shorthorn history as 'Hubback'). A "shyness" sprang up between the brothers, which became accentuated in March 1793; and the Barmpton and Ketton herds for some time lived apart, though later more amicable relations were restored. When, in October 1810, Charles Colling sold off his Ketton herd of shorthorns, Robert's herd at Barmpton 'became the centre of interest' to the breeders of shorthorns, which had then become fashionable. A famous white heifer (daughter of the bull Favourite), which weighed 1,820 pounds (830 kg) at the age of four, was painted by Thomas Weaver, and an engraving of the picture was made by William Ward, and published on 13 December 1811, with a dedication to Robert Colling. The heifer was purchased by two butchers, and exhibited at Christmas 1811 at the stables of the Three Kings, Piccadilly, as "the greatest wonder of the world of the kind", and then weighed 2,448 pounds (1,110 kg).

"The same system of inbreeding that had been in vogue at Ketton was pursued without interruption at Barmpton, and that without any admixture of fresh alloy". Robert carried on his herd until Michaelmas day, 1810, when it was sold by auction, and sixty-one lots fetched £7,852 19s.

He died unmarried at Barmpton on 7 March 1820, leaving his property to his brother Charles, a final sale being held on 3 October 1820.
