= Galloway cattle =

Breed of beef cattle originating in Scotland

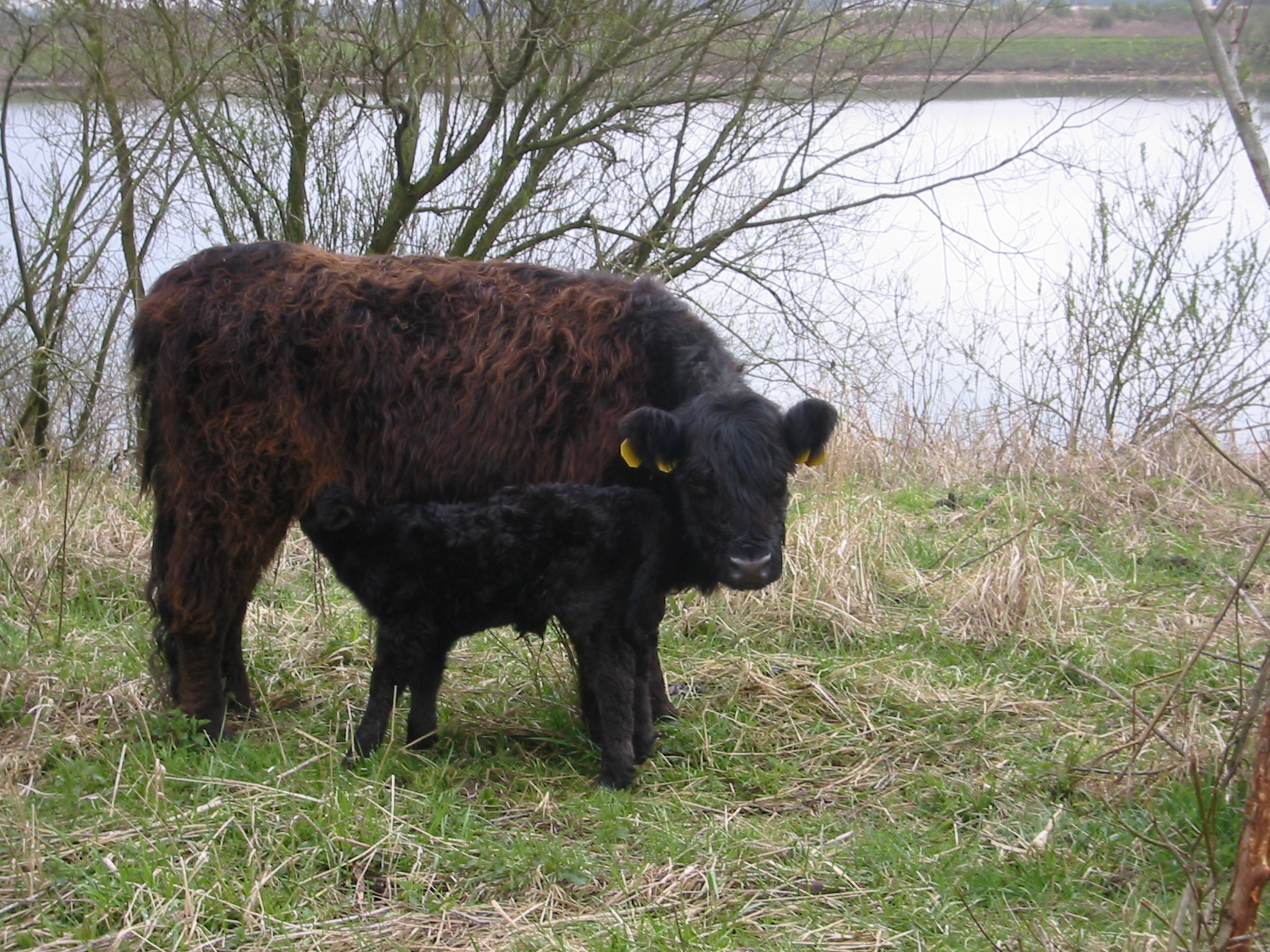
- Cow with calf
- Conservation status: FAO (2007): not at risk; DAD-IS (2022), local: endangered; DAD-IS (2022), international: not at risk; RBST (2021–2022): UK native breeds
- Other names: Southern Scots Polled
- Country of origin: UK (Scotland)
- Use: beef

Traits
- Weight: Male: average: 800 kg (1800 lb); may exceed 1000 kg (2200 lb); Female: 450–600 kg (1000–1300 lb)
- Coat: solid black; dun; red; riggit; white
- Horn status: polled
- Cattle; Bos (primigenius) taurus

The Galloway is a Scottish breed of beef cattle, named after the Galloway region of Scotland, where it originated during the seventeenth century.

It is usually black, is of average size, is naturally polled and has a thick coat suitable for the harsh climate of Scotland. It is reared mainly for beef.

In 2022 the Galloway was reported by twenty-three countries. The worldwide population stood at about 26800 head, of which the majority were in Northern Europe, with the largest populations in Denmark and Germany.

== Etymology ==
The word 'Galloway' derives from the name of a people, the Gall Gaidheil, meaning 'Scandinavian Gaels'.

== History ==
Polled black cattle were known in Scotland by the sixteenth century at the latest; one is mentioned in an instrument of sasine dated 1523. (Note: It is described as 'unum bouem nigrum hommyll'.)

The Galloway breed comes from the cattle native to the south-west region of Scotland, first fully developed in the seventeenth century. Originally, there was much variation within this breed, including many different colours and patterns. The original Galloway herd book only registered black cattle, but the recessive gene for red colour persisted in the population, and eventually dun Galloways were also allowed into the herd book. As a result, although black is still the most common colour for Galloways, they can also be red and several shades of dun. In 1877, the Galloway Cattle Society was formed.

The Galloway was introduced in Canada in 1853, first registered in 1872, and the first Galloway registry was introduced in the United States in 1882. In 1911, 35000 cattle were registered in the American Galloway Herd Book which was first created in 1882. The British Galloway Society was founded in 1908. They did not recognise dun coloured Galloway cattle, which was met with outrage and this ban was later lifted. In 1951, Galloway cattle were introduced to Australia.

In the 1950s, the breed enjoyed much success because the beef market demanded low input (feed) cattle with high quality meat. However, the BSE crisis (or mad cow disease) caused an export ban in 1990, although there were no cases of BSE found in Galloway cattle. This created a fear associated with cattle, so breed numbers declined.

Since then, there has been a change in demand as bigger leaner carcasses are now favoured. Some of the adjustments made were the adoption of AI and Embryo Transfer. The breed's original characteristics are now back in demand. This is due to the demand of high quality meat that requires economical production.

From the early nineteenth century, in south-western Scotland and north-western England, Galloway cows were commonly put to Shorthorn bulls to produce a vigorous hybrid. If the bull was white, the calf was blue roan in colour – the Blue Grey. These were easily recognisable and were much in demand. In the later nineteenth century, selection of the Whitebred Shorthorn was begun specifically for production of white sires for these calves.

In 2022 the Galloway was reported to DAD-IS by twenty-three countries, of which seventeen reported population data. The reported worldwide population stood at about 26800 head, of which the majority were in Northern Europe; the largest populations were in Denmark and Germany. The breed is 'rare' in the United States and the Livestock Conservancy classifies it as a breed to 'watch'.

== Characteristics ==
Galloway cows are of small to medium size, with weights in the range 450–600 kg; bulls normally weigh approximately 800 kg, but may reach weights of over 1000 kg. Heifer calves are born at a weight of some 35 kg, and reach a weight of about 250 kg at an age of thirteen or fourteen months.

Galloways have a thick double-layered coat that is wavy or curly. The coat of hair insulates their bodies so well that they have a minimal outer layer of fat on their bodies, which would otherwise create waste at slaughter. This coat sheds out in the summer months and in warmer climates.

It is naturally polled, without horns. This breed's shaggy coat has both a thick, woolly undercoat for warmth and stiffer guard hairs that help shed water, making them well adapted to harsher climates.

== Use ==
There is evidence of Galloway herds being milked in Cumberland for cheese production.

== See also ==
- Belted Galloway

== Societies ==
- Galloway Cattle Society of New Zealand
- American Galloway Breeders Association
- The Galloway Cattle Society of Great Britain and Ireland
- Australian Galloway Association
