= Blue Grey cattle =

UK cattle hybrid

Blue Grey
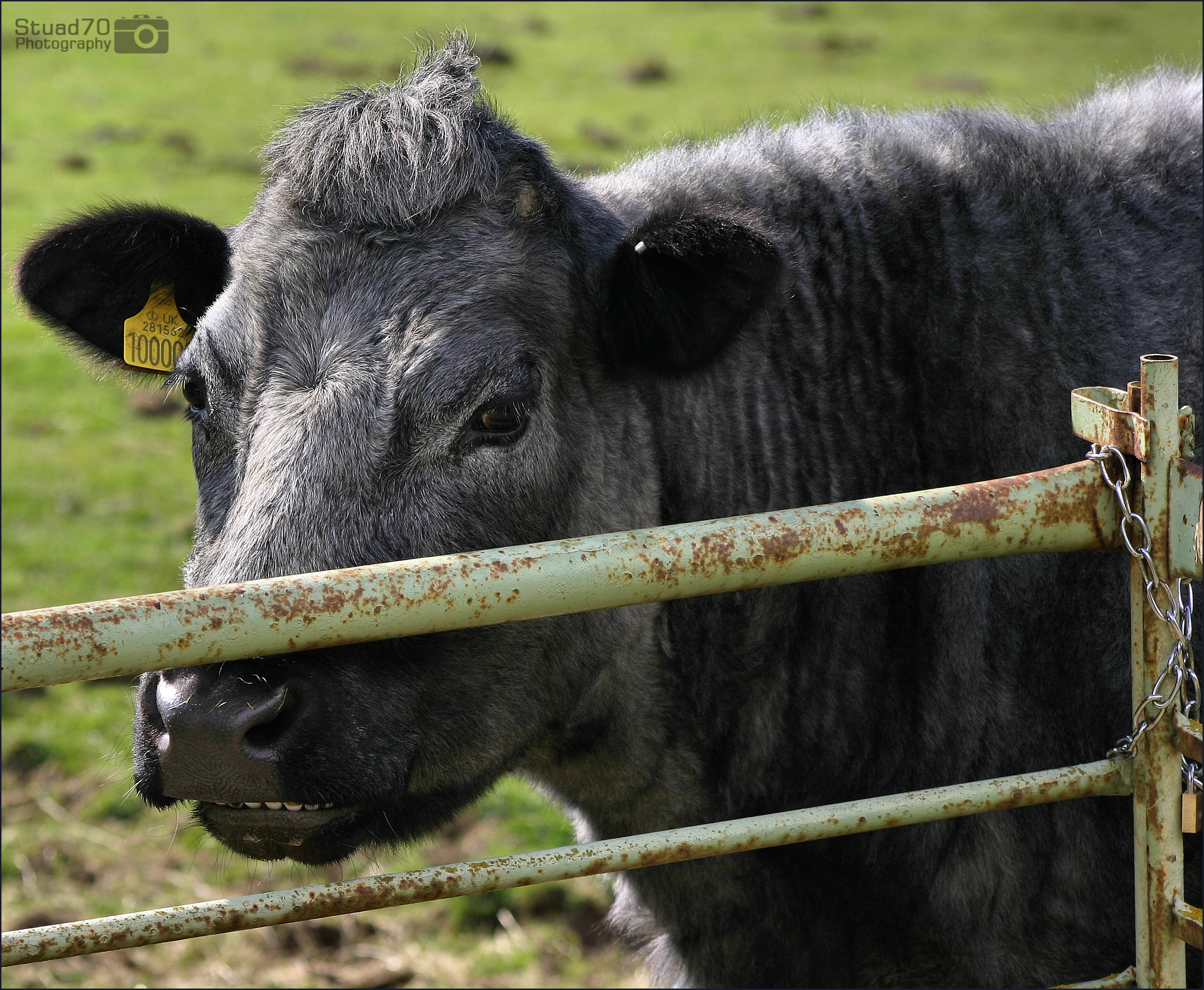
- A cow
- Country of origin: United Kingdom
- Use: suckler cow

Traits
- Coat: blue roan
- Horn status: polled
- Cattle; Bos (primigenius) taurus

The Blue Grey is a cattle hybrid traditional in south-western Scotland and north-western England. It is blue roan in colour, and results from breeding a black Galloway cow to a white Shorthorn bull. It is reared principally as a suckler cow, and is particularly well suited to upland grazing.

== History ==
In south-western Scotland and north-western England, Shorthorn bulls were used from the early nineteenth century on black Galloway cows to produce vigorous hybrid calves. If the bull was white, the calf was blue roan in colour; these were easily recognisable and were much in demand. In the later nineteenth century, selection of the Whitebred Shorthorn was begun specifically to supply white sires for production of these calves.

== Characteristics ==
The Blue Grey is blue roan in colour, and is polled (without horns). Cows have high amounts of body fat compared to other hybrids in similar overall condition, and are able to produce adequate quantities of milk even on poor grazing.

== Use ==
The Blue Grey is used principally as a suckler cow on uplands where grazing is sparse, where cows are nevertheless able to produce adequate quantities of milk for their calves. It has been used for conservation grazing in the Yorkshire Dales, where it grazes more lightly than sheep and is able to survive the winter on the coarse grasses of the limestone hills.
