= Milking Shorthorn (North America) =

North American breed of dairy cattle

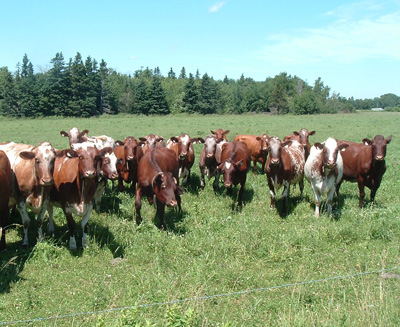
- Conservation status: FAO (2007): not at risk; DAD-IS (2026): at risk/unknown
- Country of origin: Canada; United States

Traits
- Weight: Male: 998 kg; Female: 680 kg
- Coat: red, red-and-white, roan, or white
- Horn status: horned or polled
- Cattle; Bos (primigenius) taurus

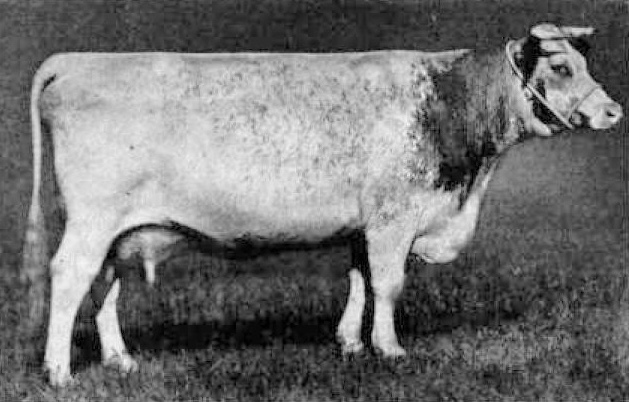
A cow, image from 1921

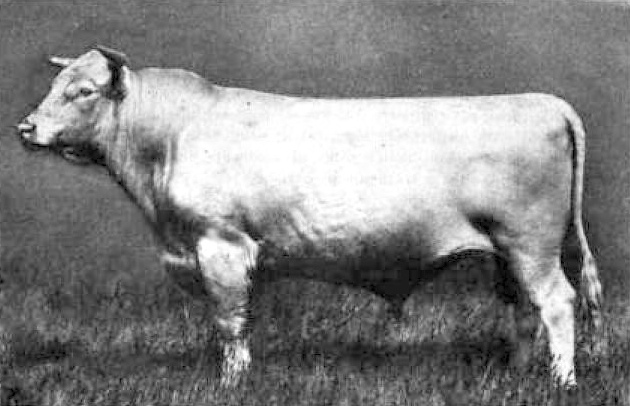
A bull, image from 1921

The Milking Shorthorn is a North American breed of dairy cattle, distributed in Canada and the United States. It derives from the Dairy Shorthorn of the United Kingdom, but has developed differently; there is a polled sub-type within the breed. It is distinct from the Milking Shorthorn of New Zealand, which forms part of the Dairy Shorthorn group.

== History ==
Short-horned cattle of good quality are documented on the Yorkshire estates of the Dukes and Earls of Northumberland in the late sixteenth century. The first significant attempts at selective breeding of these cattle were made in the late eighteenth century in County Durham by Charles and Robert Colling, who based their work on that of Robert Bakewell of Dishley, in Leicestershire. The principal work of selection for dairy qualities in the Durham/Shorthorn was done in the early nineteenth century by Thomas Bates of Kirklevington (now in Stockton-on-Tees, North Yorkshire), building principally on stock bought from the Colling brothers. A herd-book for all types of Shorthorn cattle – the Coates Herd Book – was begun by George Coates in 1822, and initially listed 850 cows and 710 bulls; (Note: It is sometimes claimed that this is the "oldest" or "first" cattle herd-book; elsewhere it is suggested that the first cattle herd-book is that kept for the Braunvieh by the monks of the Monastery of Einsiedeln in Switzerland from 1775 to 1782.) it was later taken over by the breed society, the Shorthorn Society of Great Britain and Ireland, which was formed in 1874. Thomas Bates's herd was auctioned off piecemeal in 1850, which led to an expansion of interest in cattle of this type.

Shorthorns of both beef and dairy type were exported to Maryland and Virginia in 1783; in the early nineteenth century their range expanded into Kentucky, New York, Ohio and the Midwest. A herd-book for all Shorthorn cattle was started in 1846, and in 1882 a breed society, the American Shorthorn Breeders’ Association, was set up. A Milking Shorthorn Club was established in 1912, followed by the American Milking Shorthorn Society in 1948.

No population data for the United States has been reported to DAD-IS since 2013, when there were just under 2800 head. In 2016 the total population was estimated at 25000, with 15000 registered cows; of these, fewer that 1000 were pure-bred. Small numbers of cattle relatively little affected by cross-breeding remain, and are listed by the Livestock Conservancy as the Heritage Shorthorn (Native), with a conservation status of "threatened".

In Canada there was an estimated population of over 3500 head in 1990; the total number reported for 2022 was 182, with 178 cows, of which 8 were pure-bred. In 2026 the conservation status of the breed was listed in DAD-IS as "at risk/critical".
