= Thomas Weaver (painter) =

English painter

- Born: 1774
- Died: 1843 (aged 68–69)
- Occupation: Painter

Thomas Weaver (1774 – 1843) was an English painter, mainly of livestock and horses, who was trained by John Boultbee.

== Gallery ==
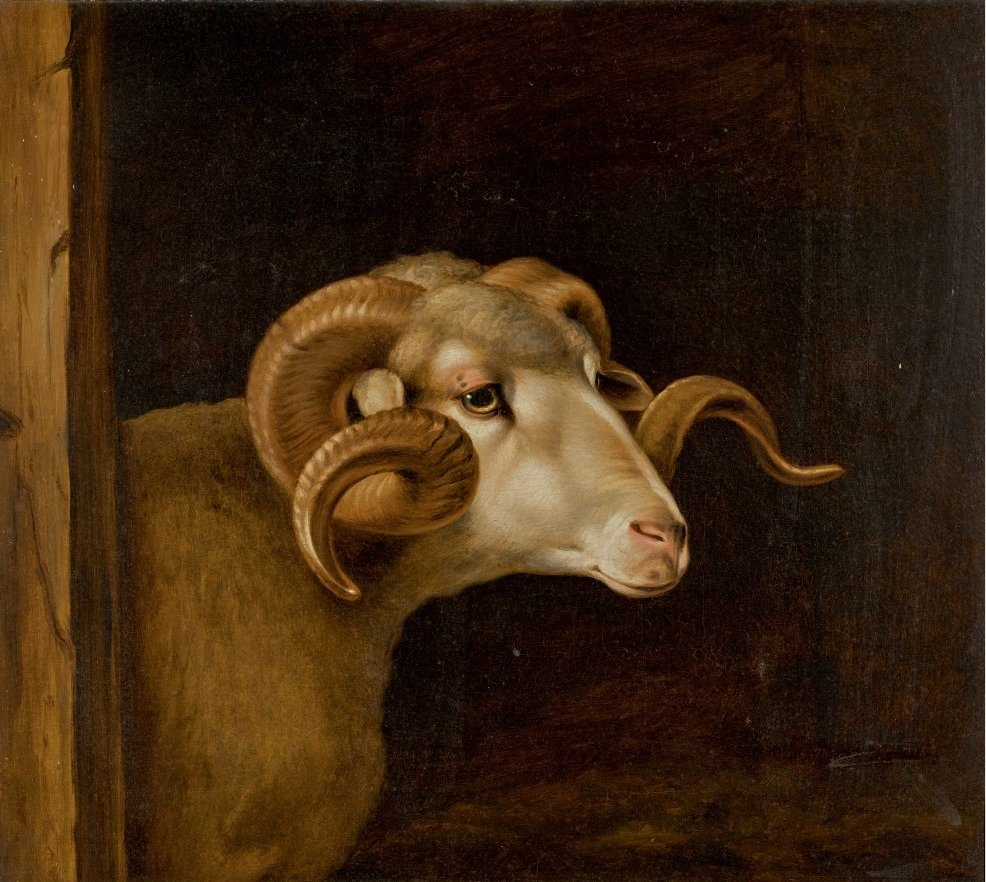

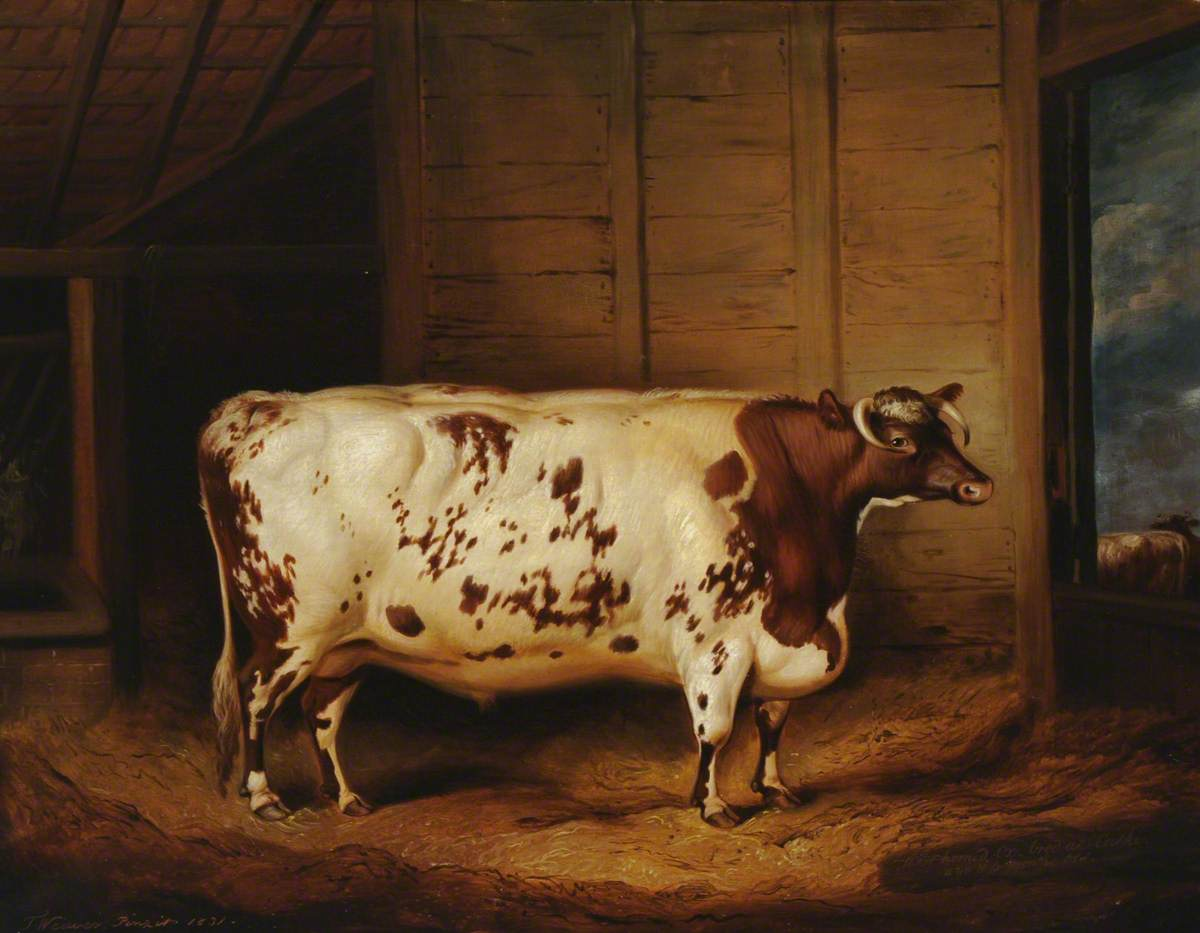

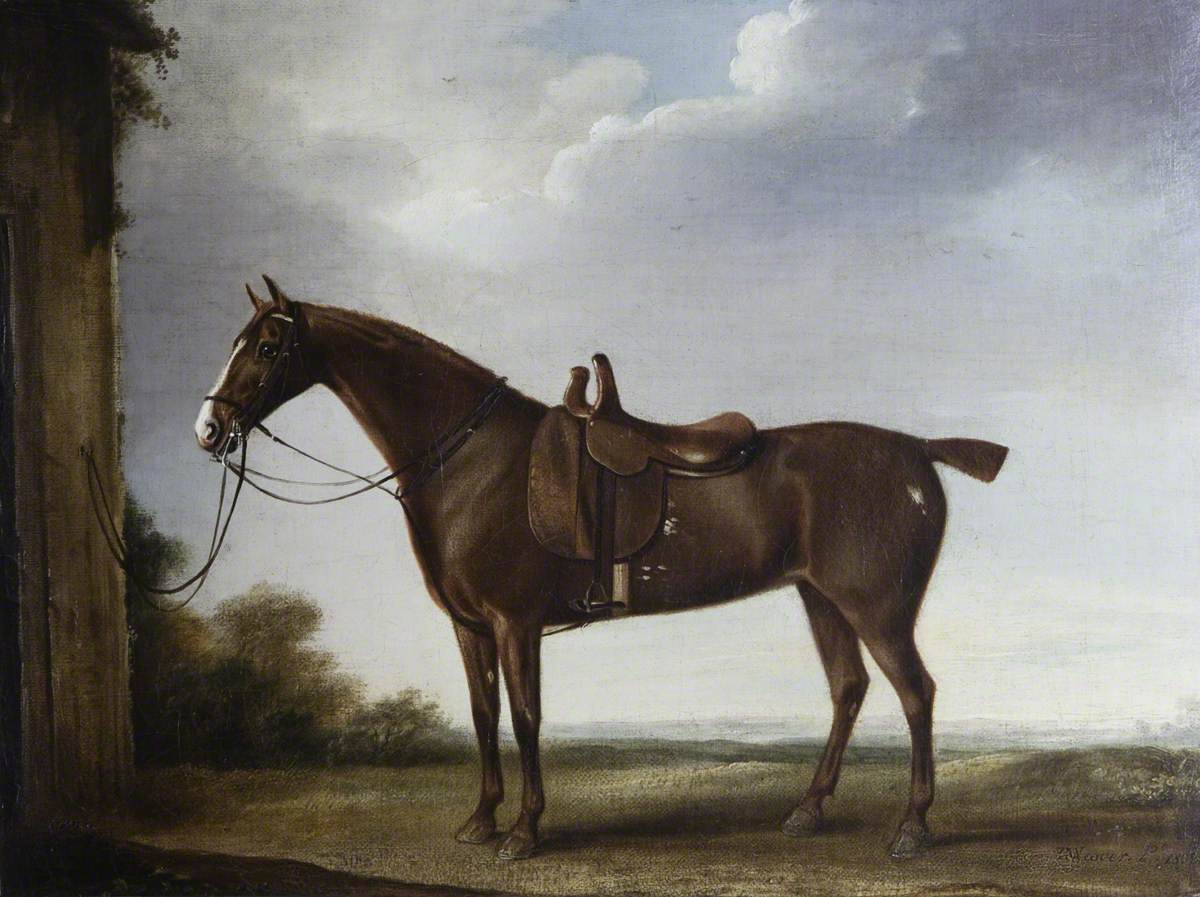

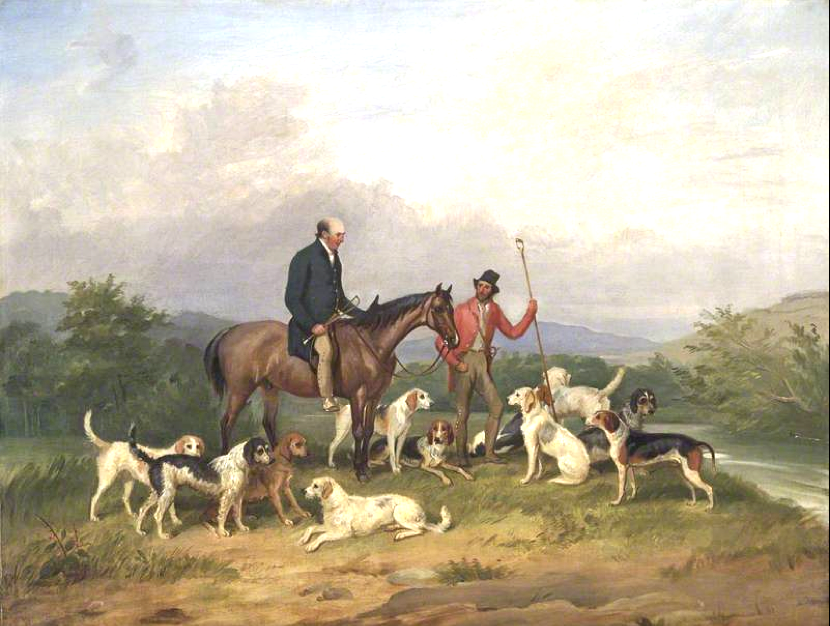

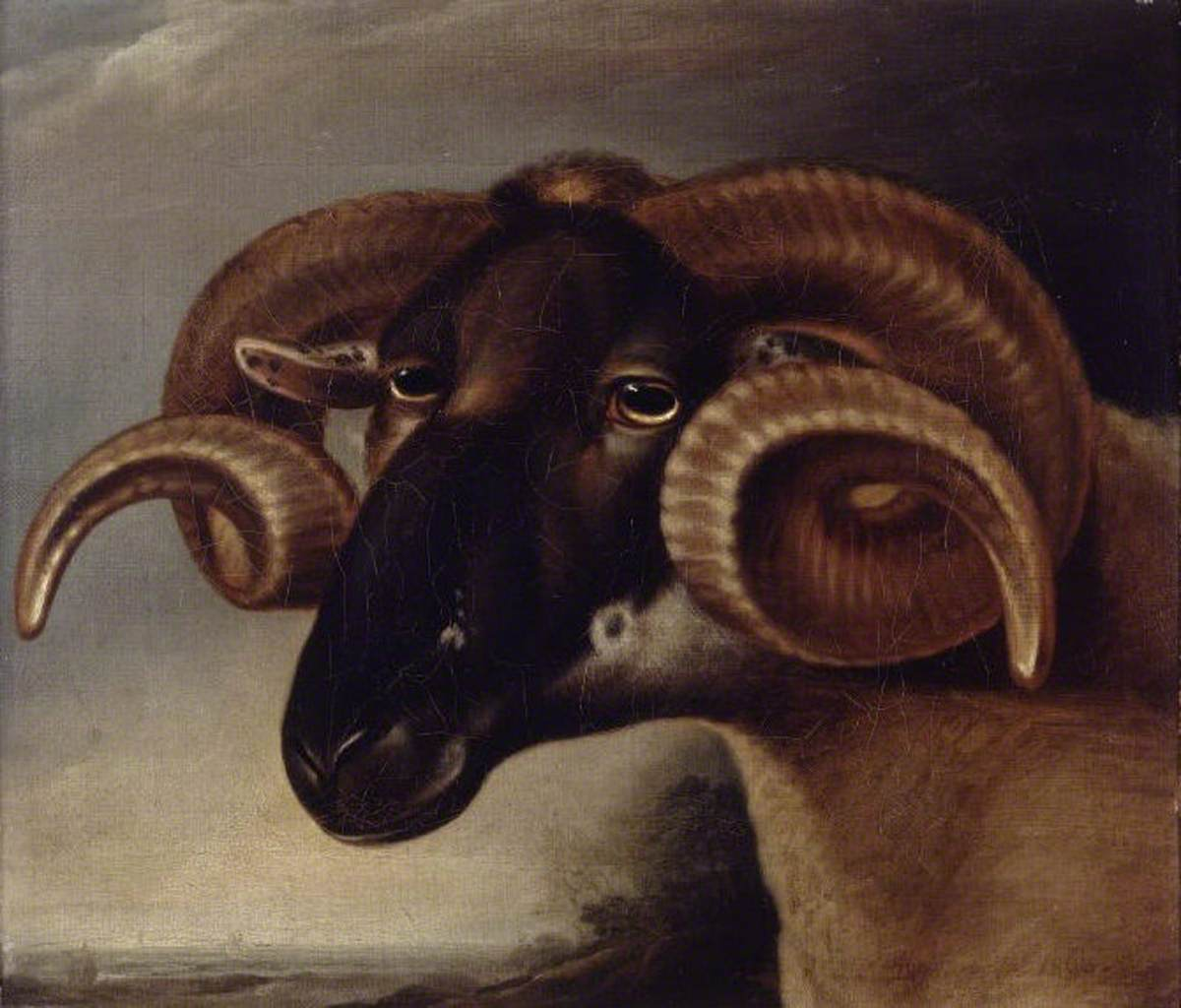
