= Illawarra Shorthorn =

Breed of cattle

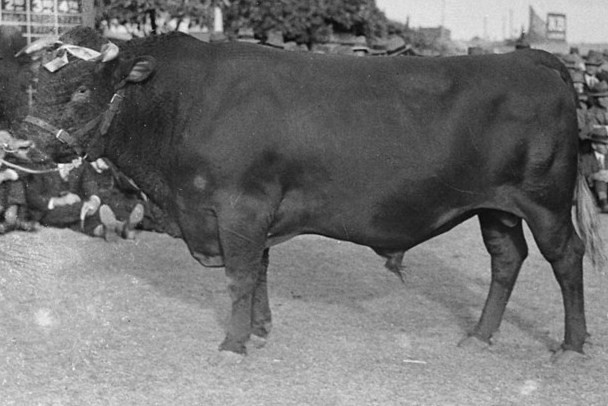
A prize-winning Illawarra bull.

The Illawarra Shorthorn or Illawarra is an Australian breed of dairy cattle. Its origins are not documented, but it is thought to derive from crossbreeding of Ayrshire, Devon, and Dairy Shorthorn. The name Illawarra was abbreviated from the earlier Australian Illawarra Shorthorn, and named after Illawarra, New South Wales.

== Conformation ==
Illawarras are horned, large-framed cattle of a predominantly red colour, with some whites or roans (mix of red and white) .

== Production ==
Illawarras produce large quantities of high butterfat and protein milk. In an official test in 1998, Illawarra cows averaged 4,829 litres of milk, with slightly over 4% butterfat and 3.4% protein, under Australia's pasture production system. According to the 2010 Australian Dairy Herd Improvement Report, the average production of an Illawarra cow is 6733 litres with a butterfat content of 3.95% and a protein level of 3.29%.

== Temperament ==
Illawarras are very docile cows that are noted for their longevity. They make good handling cattle for shows and are easy to work with in the dairy.

== Adaptability ==
Illawarras can stand weather exceeding 40°C and below freezing. They make the most out of feed and do not need much supplementary feeding. This adaptability under a variety conditions has contributed to the growth of the breed.

== Exports ==
Illawarra cattle, embryos, and semen have been exported to Central America, Indonesia, Japan, Korea, Canada, the Middle East, New Zealand, the Pacific Islands, Pakistan, the United Kingdom, and the United States.
