= Shields, Tyne and Wear =

Pair of riverside towns in England

Shields
- Foreground: North Shields ferry terminal.; Midground: River Tyne.; Background: South Shields ferry terminal.

- Screenshot of OpenStreetMap showing North Shields and South Shields.

- Location within Tyne and Wear
- Population: 81,474
- Metropolitan borough: North Tyneside and South Tyneside
- Metropolitan county: Tyne and Wear
- Region: North East
- Country: England
- Sovereign state: United Kingdom
- Postcode district: NE29, NE30, NE33, NE34
- Dialling code: 0191
- Police: Northumbria
- Fire: Tyne and Wear
- Ambulance: North East
- UK Parliament: Tynemouth and South Shields

Shields (/ʃiːlz/ SHEELZ) is an area of Tyneside in Northern England, consisting of North Shields and South Shields. The two towns are opposite each other on the banks of the River Tyne.

The name derives from Middle English schele meaning "temporary sheds or huts used by fishermen".

== Transportation ==
=== Ferry ===
There is a frequent pedestrian ferry service between North Shields and South Shields. The Shields Ferry carries tens of thousands of commuters and pleasure trippers each year. There has been a cross-river ferry service between the two towns since 1377.
