= Dishley Grange =

House in Leicestershire, England

Coordinates: 52°47′11″N 1°14′28″W

Dishley Grange is a house in Dishley, Leicestershire, just north-west of Loughborough on the A6 road. Dishley Grange was the home of the famous agriculturalist Robert Bakewell (1725–1795). However, the present building was rebuilt in 1845 and was grade II listed in 1984.
