= John Boultbee (artist) =

English painter

- Born: 4 June 1753; Osgathorpe, Leicestershire, UK
- Died: 30 November 1812 (aged 59); Liverpool, UK
- Occupation: Painter

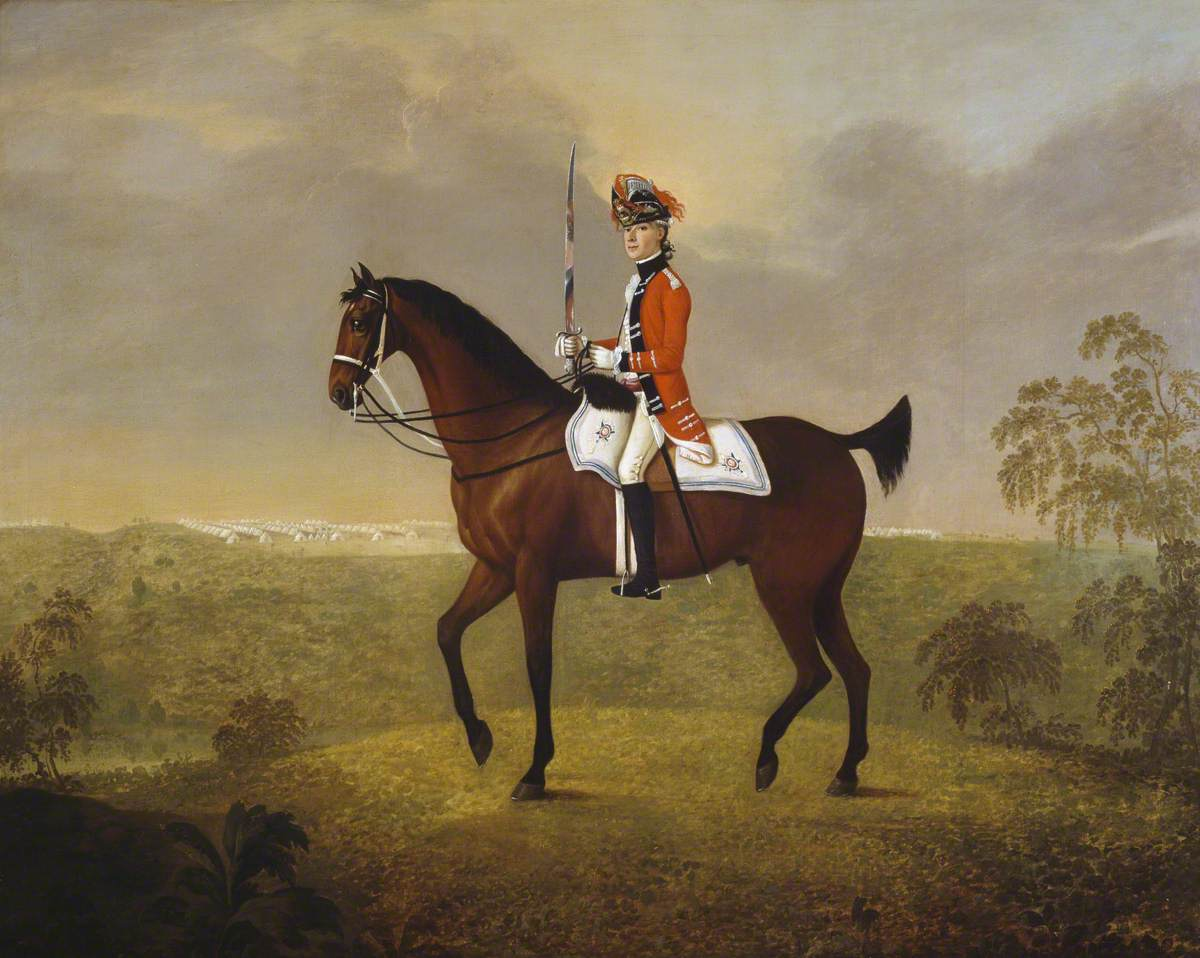
1780 portrait of Thomas Parkyns by Boultbee

John Boultbee (4 June 1753 – 30 November 1812) was an English painter of equestrian and other sporting subjects. He was born in Osgathorpe, Leicestershire on 4 June 1753 and died in Liverpool on 30 November 1812. He had a twin brother Thomas (1753–1808) who was also a painter. They both entered the Royal Academy Schools in 1775 during the period of the presidency of Sir Joshua Reynolds, exhibiting in London, including at the Royal Academy. John Boultbee exhibited six paintings at the Royal Academy The first in 1776 (A landscape) and the last two in 1788 (Portrait of Horses and Portrait of a favourite horse of Mr Bakewell).

John Boultbee was greatly admired by George III, who commissioned several horse-portraits by him and assigned him a residence in Windsor Great Park so that he might carry out his painting duties more conveniently. Boultbee was influenced by the work of George Stubbs, and Sawrey Gilpin. Later in life he lived and worked in Derby, Leicestershire, Chester and finally Liverpool where he died in 1812.

== Bibliography ==
- Noakes, Aubrey, Sportsmen in a landscape. JB Lippincott & Co, Philadelphia, 1954.
- Waterhouse, Ellis. The dictionary of British 18th century painters in oils and crayons. Antique Collectors' Club, Woodbridge, Suffolk, 1981.
