= Robert Bakewell (agriculturalist) =

English agriculturalist

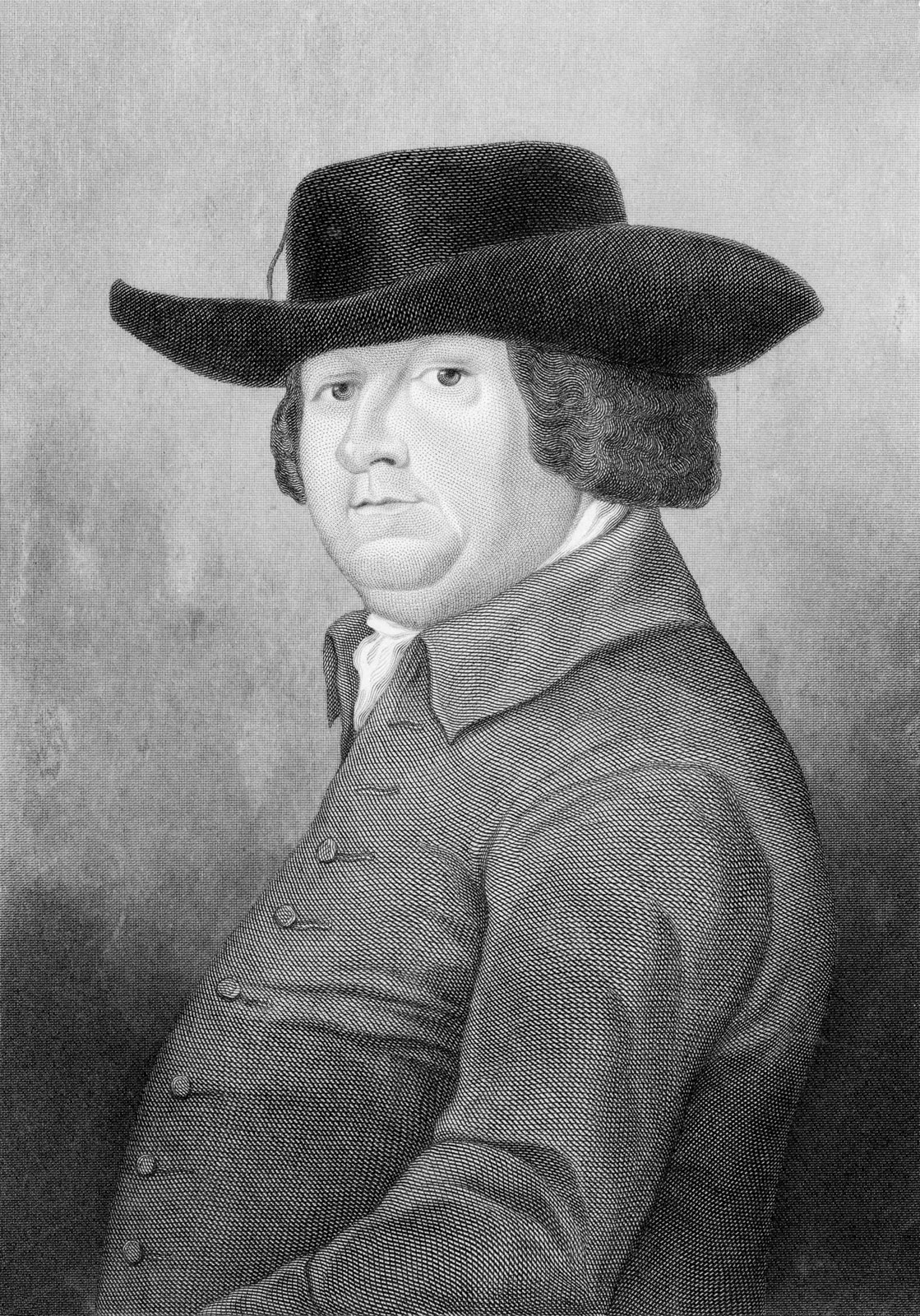
Robert Bakewell

Robert Bakewell (23 May 1725 – 1 October 1795) was an English agriculturalist, now recognized as one of the most important figures in the British Agricultural Revolution. In addition to work in agronomy, Bakewell is particularly notable as the first to implement systematic selective breeding of livestock. His advancements not only led to specific improvements in sheep, cattle and horses, but contributed to general knowledge of artificial selection.

== Early life ==
Robert Bakewell, the second eldest son, was born on 23 May 1725 at Dishley Grange, near Loughborough in Leicestershire. As a young man he travelled extensively in Europe and Britain, learning about other farming methods. Others interested in his work included Prince Grigory Potemkin and François de la Rochefoucauld (1765–1848).

He supported his revolutionary new breeding techniques with grassland irrigation, flooding and fertilizing pasturelands to improve grazing. He taught these practices to many farmers, and in 1783 formed The Dishley Society to promote them and to advance the interests of livestock breeders. His apprentices and contemporaries, especially Thomas Coke, 1st Earl of Leicester, used his methods to continue improvements to British livestock long after his death in October 1795.

=== Sheep ===
Arguably the most influential of Bakewell's breeding programs was with sheep. Using native stock, he was able to quickly select for large, yet fine-boned sheep, with long, lustrous wool. The Lincoln Longwool was improved by Bakewell, and in turn the Lincoln was used to develop the subsequent breed, named the New (or Dishley) Leicester. It was hornless and had a square, meaty body with straight top lines.

These sheep were exported widely, including to Australia and North America, and have contributed to numerous modern breeds, despite the fact that they fell quickly out of favour as market preferences in meat and textiles changed. Bloodlines of these original New Leicesters survive today as the English Leicester (or Leicester Longwool), which is primarily kept for wool production.

=== Cattle ===
He crossed long-horned heifers and a Westmoreland bull to eventually create the Dishley Longhorn. As more and more farmers followed his lead, farm animals increased dramatically in size and quality. In 1700, the average weight of a bull sold for slaughter was 370 pounds (168 kg). By 1786, that weight had more than doubled to 840 pounds (381 kg). However, after his death, the Dishley Longhorn was replaced with short-horn versions.

=== Horses ===
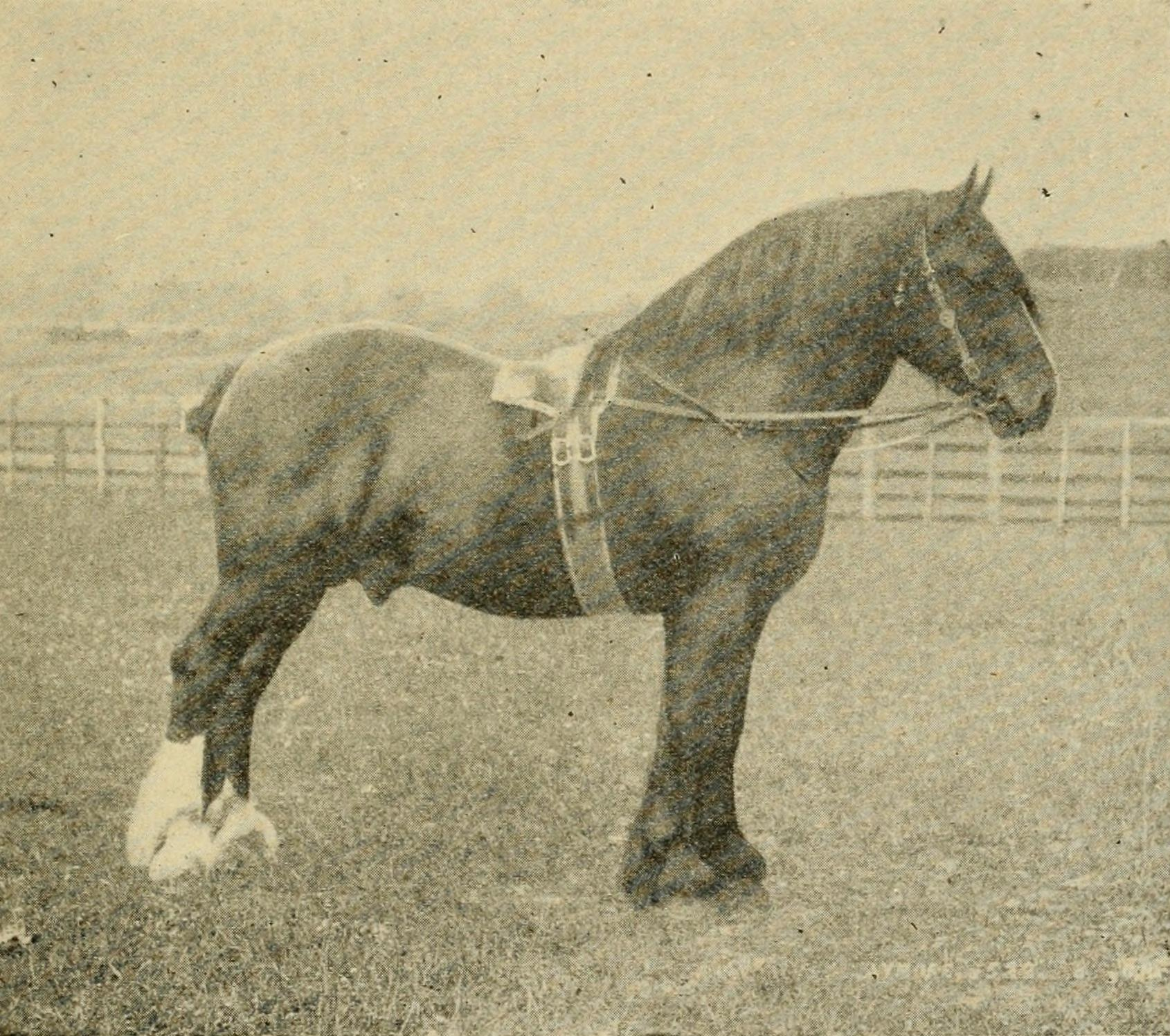
Picture of a descendant from Bakewell's breeding effort, described as Improved Lincolnshire Dray Horse, pre 1907.

Robert Bakewell bred the Improved Black Cart horse, which later became a Shire horse. The breed was also known as Heavy Black or Lincolnshire Black. In other sources, the breed is also referred to Lincolnshire Dray Horse or Bakewell Black, in honour of his influence.

== Legacy ==
Several buildings in Loughborough are named after Bakewell including a hall of residence at Loughborough University and a primary school in the town.

=== Influence on Darwin ===
Selective breeding, which Charles Darwin described as artificial selection, was an inspiration for his theory of natural selection. In On the Origin of Species he cited Bakewell's work as demonstrating variation under domestication, in which methodical breeding during Bakewell's lifetime led to considerable modification of the forms and qualities of his cattle, and the unconscious production of two distinct strains when two flocks of Leicester sheep were kept by Mr. Buckley and Mr. Burgess, "purely bred from the original stock of Mr. Bakewell for upwards of fifty years" with the unanticipated result that "the difference between the sheep possessed by these two gentlemen is so great that they have the appearance of being quite different varieties."

=== New Dishley Society ===
The New Dishley Society has been created to promote the memory of Robert Bakewell and of his contemporaries and students of his methods. The society aims to disseminate knowledge of his work and appreciation of his pioneering legacy in the breeding of improved farm livestock and better crop management. It supports research into the revolutionary agricultural techniques of the eighteenth and early nineteenth centuries and into the men who developed these techniques.

== Controversy ==
Bakewell's pioneering and extremely aggressive use of breeding in-and-in may have contributed to the spread of prionic diseases, such as scrapie, among livestock of the region.

== See also ==
- Agricultural science
- Arthur Young (agriculturist)
- Blocking (statistics)

== Bibliography ==
- Young 1771, "Letter II", in The Farmer's Tour through the East of England, vol. I (London, 1771 ), p. 124
- Young, A., 1776-1791 (1932): Tours in England and Wales. (Selected from the Annals of Agriculture), London School of Economics
- Marshall 1790, The rural economy of the Midland counties (2 vols, London, 1790; vol1/vol2)
- W. Redhead, R. Laing and W. Marshall jun., Observations on the different breeds of sheep, and the state of sheep farming in some of the principal counties of England (Edinburgh, 1792), pp. 33–39
- John Lawrence, "Robert Bakewell", The Annual Necrology for 1797-8; including, also, various articles of neglected biography (London, 1800/1805) (note: final 2-3 pages omitted from Google Books scan of the 1800 edition)
- Pitt 1809, A General View of the Agriculture of the County of Leicester. Richard Phillips, London.
- J. Hunt, Agricultural memoirs; or history of the Dishley System. In answer to Sir John Saunders Sebright, Bart., M.P. (Nottingham, 1812), p. 119
- Youatt 1834, Cattle: Their breeds, management, and diseases
- George Culley & Robert Heaton 1804, Observations on live stock: containing hints for choosing and improving the best breeds of the most useful kinds of domestic animals
- Darwin, Charles, 1842, "Sketch on Natural Selection"
- Darwin, Charles, 1844, "On the tendency of species to form varieties; and on the Perpetuation of Varieties and Species by Natural Means of Selection"
- Housman 1894, "Robert Bakewell", Journal of the Royal Agricultural Society of England
- Pawson 1957, Robert Bakewell: Pioneer livestock breeder
- Nicholas Russell 1986, Like Engend'ring Like: Heredity and Animal Breeding in Early Modern England
- Hall & Clutton-Brock 1989, Two hundred years of British farm livestock
- Pat Stanley 1995, Robert Bakewell and the Longhorn Breed of Cattle (ISBN 0-85236-305-2)
- Wykes 2004, "Robert Bakewell (1725-1795) of Dishley: farmer and livestock improver"
- Wood & Orel 2005, "Scientific Breeding in Central Europe during the Early Nineteenth Century: Background to Mendel's Later Work", Journal of the History of Biology 38, p. 251
- Cobb 2006, "Heredity before genetics: a history"
- Wood, R. J. & Orel, V. Genetic Prehistory in Selective Breeding: a Prelude to Mendel (Oxford Univ. Press, Oxford, 2001)
- Schinto 2006, "Good Breeding: British Livestock Portraits, 1780-1900", Gastronomica (Summer 2006)
- Orel 1997, "Cloning, Inbreeding, and History", Quarterly Review of Biology 72:4 (December 1997), p. 437-440
- Derry 2003, Bred for Perfection: Shorthorn Cattle, Collies, and Arabian Horses since 1800 (Baltimore, MD: Johns Hopkins University Press, 2003), p. 9
- Harriet Ritvo, The Animal Estate (Cambridge, MA: Harvard University Press, 1987), p. 47
- Anne Orde (ed.), Matthew Culley, George Culley: Travel Journals and Letters, 1765-1798 (Oxford: Oxford University Press, 2002), p. 10
- Trow-Smith, History of British livestock husbandry, p. 59
- R. M. Hartwell, The Industrial Revolution and economic growth (1972), p. 332
