= Ornamental animal =

Animal kept for visual display

An ornamental animal is an animal kept for display or curiosity, often in a park. They often offer little practical value (such as meat, companionship or protection), and are instead kept for their appearances. A wide range of mammals, birds and fish have been kept as ornamental animals.

Ornamental animals have often formed the basis of introduced and invasive populations. The keeping and husbandry of ornamental animals has also preserved breeds, types and even species which are rare or extinct elsewhere. The term usually does not mean animals kept in zoos, instead referring to animals in private collections.

== History ==
The first ornamental animals were those kept in the private menageries of royalty. The earliest known example of animals kept on display comes from Mesopotamia, in the third dynasty of Ur. Other early menageries belonged to Egypt's Queen Hatshepsut, who had animals such as cheetahs and a giraffe imported to her personal zoo, and the Zhou Dynasty's King Wen, who founded a "divine park" with deer and pheasants. Unlike modern zoos, which typically focus on conservation and allow the public to visit, these menageries were primarily for the personal amusement of the royals, rarely if ever admitted the public, and the animals served little purpose but as curiosities.

In the United Kingdom and Ireland during the medieval period, deer parks, enclosed areas with deer, became popular. These parks were primarily used for hunting. While some of the deer residing in them were native species, many exotic species, like the muntjac, fallow deer, and the Japanese sika deer, were imported. Eventually these animals were kept around not only as game, but for their unique appearance and appeal as exotics.

Ornamental animals differ from most livestock or pets in that they are kept for their visual appeal, as opposed to being raised for meat, dairy, companionship, or other practical reasons. Peafowl, one of the most popular ornamental bird species, are very poor at keeping away pests, and their meat is considered by many to be of poor quality, yet based on their colors alone they can sell for high prices.

== Introduced species ==
Some ornamental animals have escaped from captivity and have formed feral populations. Sometimes, ornamental animals that have become feral end up being more numerous in their introduced habitat versus their native one. Deer are not native to Australia, but there are currently six species of deer found there, all of which were initially brought there in the 19th century as ornamentals Indian hog deer are native to Sri Lanka and India, but are believed to be more abundant in Australia, where they were brought as an ornamental animal. The Mandarin duck is also believed to be more numerous in the United Kingdom than its native range.

Feral ornamental species can have negative effects on their new environments. For example, deer in Australia overgrazed Tasmanian terrain, and on the mainland have been linked (especially in the case of introduced red deer) towards the spreading of ticks to cattle. However, some ornamental species become feral, yet do not impact the environment. The Mandarin duck and rose-ringed parakeet are both ornamental animals introduced to the United Kingdom, yet both are considered benign towards the local environment.

Controlling species once they become invasive can be challenging, as hunters may prefer other types of game over the exotics that need culling. The Canada goose, for example, is an ornamental animal that has become a nuisance in the United Kingdom, yet it is not a popular target for hunters. Other times, social taboos may prevent hunters from targeting the animals. In the case of ornamental deer going feral in Tasmania, populations took years to stabilize because hunters were reluctant to cull does.

== Conservation ==
A number of animals have been protected from local or worldwide extinction by being kept as ornamental animals. A notable example is Père David's deer, which almost went extinct after the Boxer Rebellion. Several specimens were brought to Woburn Park, where they bred very quickly, and with no noticeable genetic bottleneck despite the small initial population.

== List of ornamental animals ==
The following are breeds or species whose history has included a significant period as ornamental animals, either globally or in particular regions (animals kept primarily in modern zoos, aquaria or waterfowl collections are not included):

=== Deer ===
- Père David's deer (Elaphurus davidianus): Became extinct in the wild before 1900, but survived in the park of the Chinese Emperor near Peking. After the Boxer Rebellion, the last Chinese specimens were killed, but some survived in Woburn Park in England. Now reintroduced to the wild in China.
- Reeves's muntjac (Muntiacus reevesi): Escaped from Woburn Park in England, and now established as a feral animal throughout much of lowland England, causing considerable damage to native woodland.
- Sika deer (Cervus nippon): Established in the UK and other places from park escapes. Poses a hybridisation threat to other deer species such as red deer Cervus elephus.
- Water deer (Hydropotes inermis): Another species which has escaped from Woburn Park, having a feral population in the surrounding area of England.
- Chital (Axis axis): Endangered deer species in Bangladesh. It is a medium-sized deer species. It is an ornamental animal in Bangladesh and India.

=== Cattle ===
- British White cattle: White cattle with red or black ears were kept in parks in Britain and Ireland over many hundreds of years. Polled (hornless) herds and individuals of these formed the basis of the usually black-eared British White.
- Galloway cattle: Polled, woolly cattle, originally from Scotland but also often kept as park animals in Britain during the 18th and 19th centuries, especially as colour forms such as the Belted Galloway.
- White Park cattle: A white, usually black-eared beef breed derived from horned herds and individuals of the British park cattle.
- Chillingham cattle: A red-eared type of White Park which lives only as a feral animal at Chillingham Castle in northern England (and at one other site).
- Vaynol cattle: A black-eared type of White Park recognised as a separate rare breed, from the Vaynol estate in North Wales.

=== Sheep ===
- Black Welsh Mountain sheep: A colour variety of Welsh Mountain sheep, with a history as an ornamental animal.
- Castlemilk Moorit: A short-tailed breed of sheep, developed in Scotland as an ornamental animal from crosses of other breeds and wild sheep.
- Hebridean sheep: A black, short-tailed breed of sheep, often multi-horned. It is derived from multi-coloured sheep kept in the Hebrides since the Iron Age, which became extinct there in the late 19th century. A population survived in parks in England and Scotland, where they became always black, probably from cross-breeding with another ornamental breed, Jacob sheep.
- Jacob sheep: A pied, often multi-horned breed of sheep which was kept in parks in England for several centuries. Unrelated to other British sheep, but of uncertain origin.

=== Goats ===
- Bagot goat: A small, pied goat with large horns, kept at Blithfield Hall, Staffordshire, England, reputedly since the Middle Ages, and probably derived originally from similar goats from the Rhone region of Switzerland and France.

=== Other mammals ===
- Eastern gray squirrel (Sciurus carolinensis): Introduced as an ornamental animal to England and other places, and established as a feral animal; implicated in the steep decline in mainland Great Britain of the native Red Squirrel (Sciurus vulgaris).
- Red-necked wallaby (Notamacropus rufogriseus).: Escaped or introduced to various areas in the United Kingdom, France and New Zealand.

=== Fish ===
- Guppy (Poecilia reticulata) is an ornamental fish worldwide and it is kept in the aquariums of the fishkeepers.
- Goldfish (Carassius auratus) is one of the most popular ornamental fishes in the world.
- Koi (Cyprinus rubrofuscus "koi") is another most popular fish worldwide.
- Siamese fighting fish (Betta splendens)
- Gouramis
- Tetras
- Tiger barb (Puntigrus tetrazona)
- Oscar (Astronotus ocellatus)
- Flowerhorn cichlid

=== Birds ===
Birds' ornamental value derives in part from their feather coloration. Feather colors are often produced by carotenoids.

- Peafowl
- Mandarin duck, introduced to the United Kingdom
- Canada goose, introduced to the United Kingdom
- Red-crested pochard, introduced to the United Kingdom
- Pink-footed goose, introduced to the United Kingdom
- Egyptian goose, introduced to Europe, the United States, and elsewhere outside their natural range.

== See also ==
- Exotic pet
- Introduced species
- Invasive species
