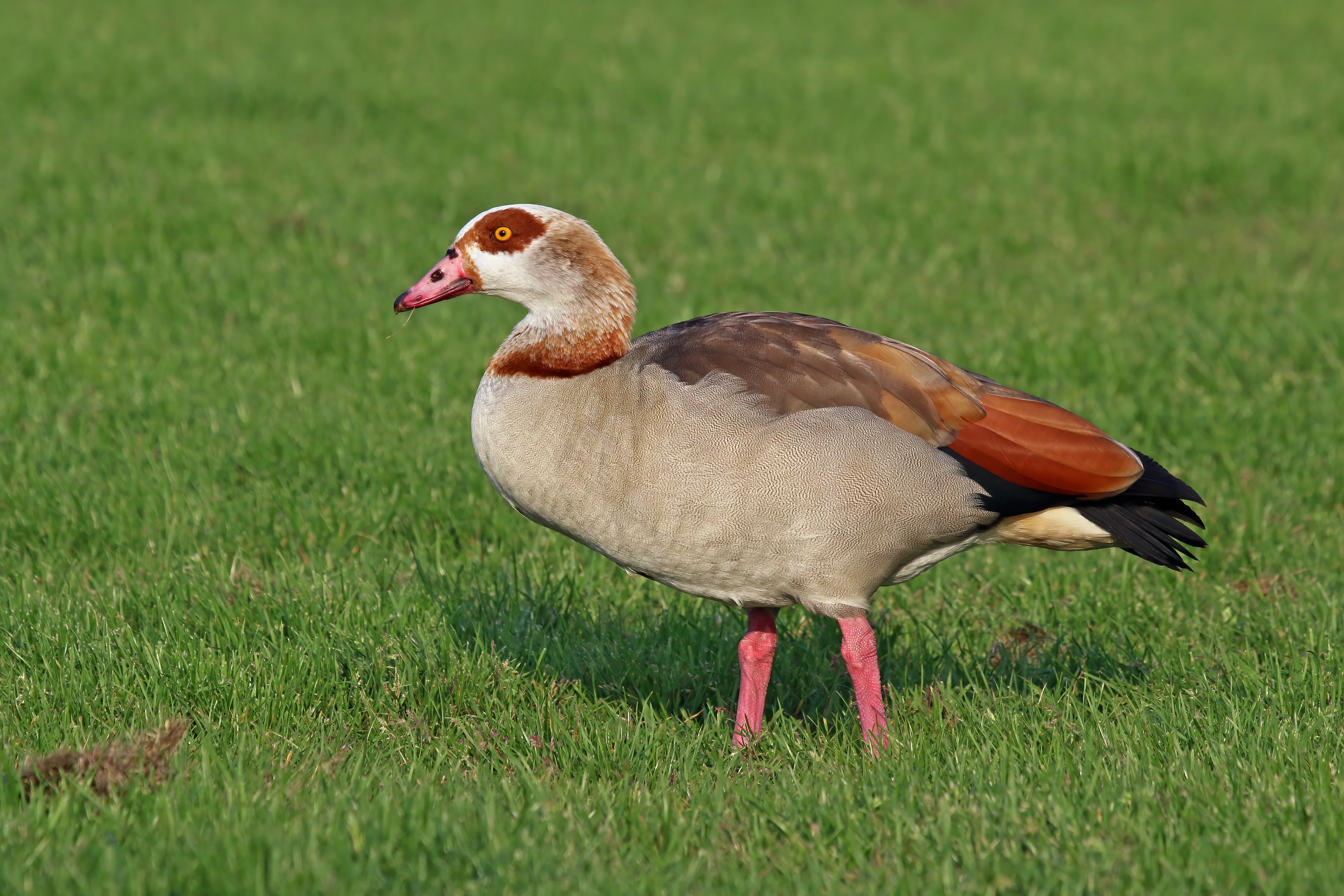
- Adult in London

Conservation status
- Least Concern (IUCN 3.1)

Scientific classification
- Kingdom: Animalia
- Phylum: Chordata
- Class: Aves
- Order: Anseriformes
- Family: Anatidae
- Genus: Alopochen
- Species: A. aegyptiaca

Binomial name
- Alopochen aegyptiaca (Linnaeus, 1766)
- Native range Overwinters in the lower Nile valley, introduced (and reintroduced) to Middle East, Western Europe, etc.

Synonyms
- Anas aegyptiaca Linnaeus, 1766

Audio
- Call of a female bird in Germany

= Egyptian goose =

Species of goose

The Egyptian goose (Alopochen aegyptiaca) is an African member of the Anatidae family including ducks, geese, and swans. Because of its popularity chiefly as an ornamental bird, the species has also been introduced to Europe, the United States, and elsewhere outside its natural range. Egyptian geese were regularly represented in ancient Egyptian art.

== Taxonomy ==
The Egyptian goose was formally described in 1766 by Swedish naturalist Carl Linnaeus in the 12th edition of his Systema Naturae under the binomial name Anas aegyptiaca. Linnaeus partly based his account on the L'oye d'Egypte that had been described and illustrated in 1760 by French ornithologist Mathurin Jacques Brisson in his Ornithologie. Brisson used the Latin name Anser Egyptiatiacus, and although he coined Latin names for species, these do not conform to the binomial system and are not recognised by the International Commission on Zoological Nomenclature. The Egyptian goose is now placed with the extinct Mauritius sheldgoose and the extinct Reunion sheldgoose in the genus Alopochen that was introduced in 1885 by Norwegian-born zoologist Leonhard Stejneger. The species is monotypic; no subspecies are recognised. The generic name Alopochen (literally, "fox-goose") is based on Greek ἀλωπός (alōpós, also ἀλώπηξ alōpēx), "fox", and χήν (chēn) "goose", referring to the ruddy colour of its back. The word χήν : chēn is grammatically of either masculine or feminine gender. The species name aegyptiacus (or aegyptiaca) is from the Latin Aegyptiacus, "Egyptian".

The Egyptian goose is believed to be most closely related to the shelducks (genus Tadorna) and their relatives and is placed with them in the subfamily Tadorninae. It is the only extant member of the genus Alopochen, which also contains closely related prehistoric and recently extinct species. mtDNA cytochrome b sequence data suggest that the relationships of Alopochen to Tadorna need further investigation.

== Description ==
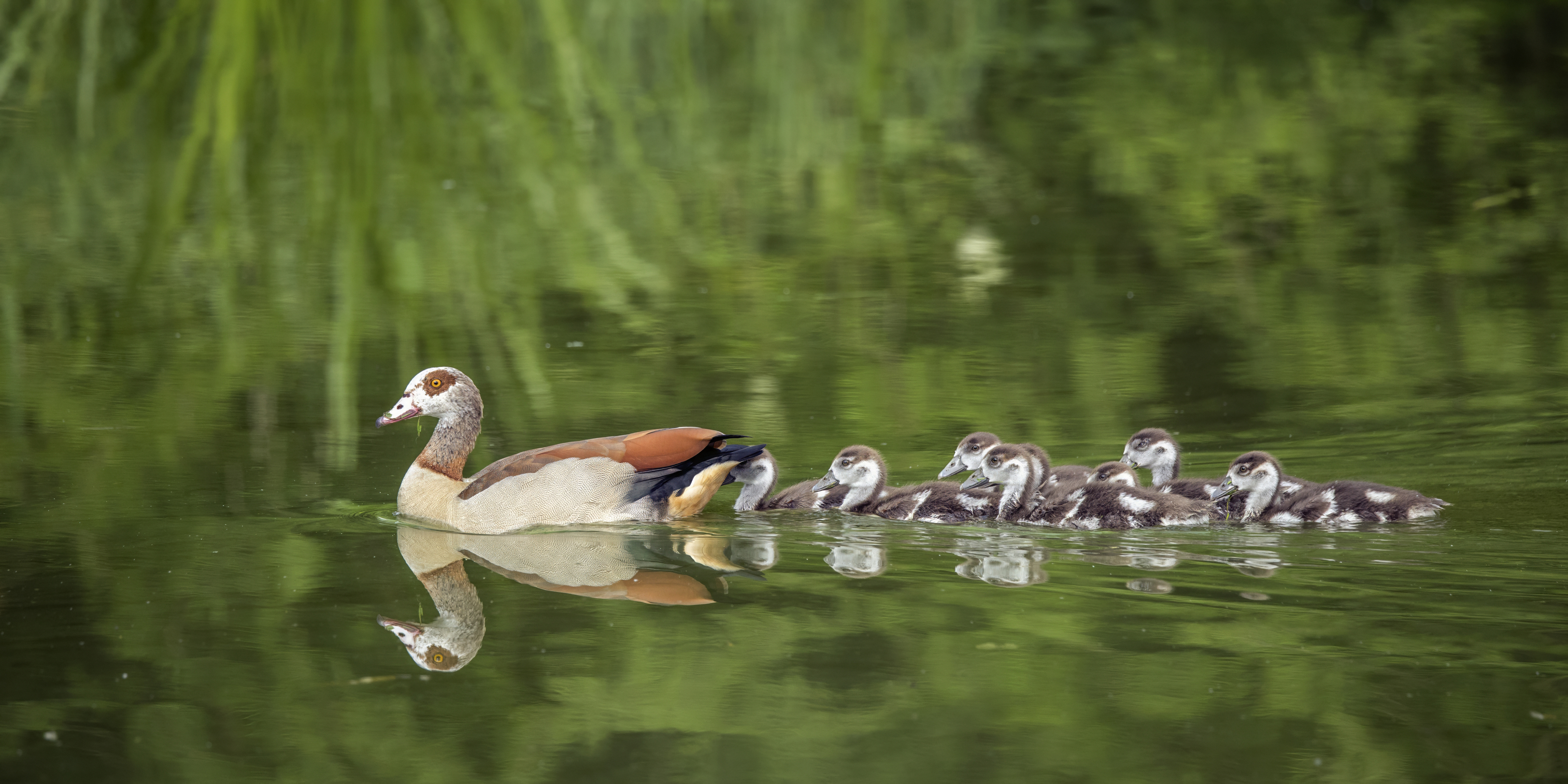
Adult and goslings

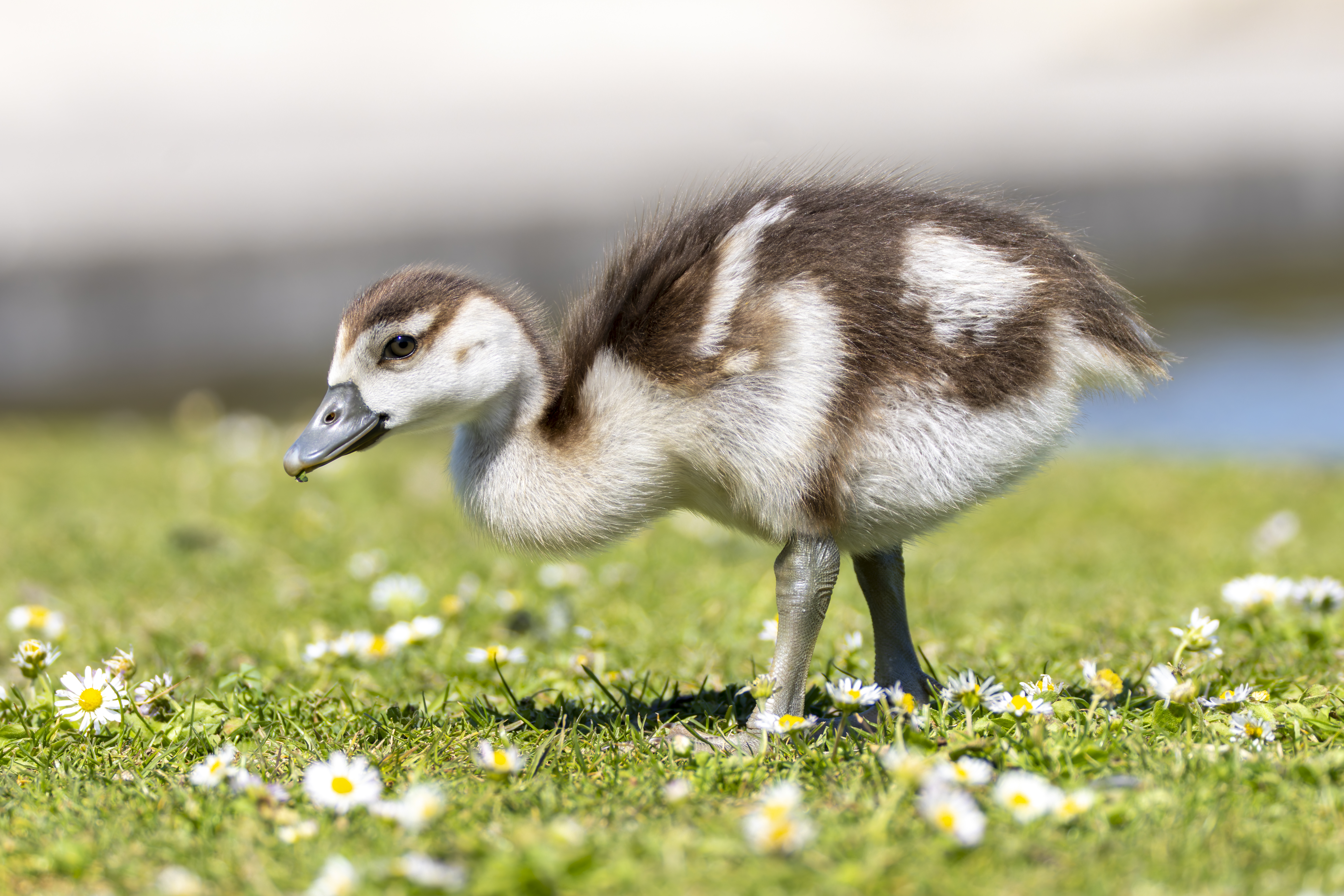
Gosling

It swims well and appears heavy in flight, more like a goose than a duck, hence the English name. Typically, they are 63–73 cm (25–29 in) in length and weigh 1,500–2,348 g (3.307–5.176 lb).

The sexes of this species are identical in plumage, but the males are usually somewhat larger. They vary greatly in plumage tone, with some birds greyer and others browner, but this variation has not been observed to be sex- or age-related. A large part of the wings of mature birds is white, but the white is hidden by the wing coverts when at rest. When it is aroused, either in alarm or aggression, the white is displayed.

Egyptian geese in the wild can live for up to 15 years, while captive individuals have been recorded reaching an age of 35.

The voices and vocalisations of the sexes differ, the male having a hoarse, subdued, duck-like quack, which seldom sounds unless it is aroused, as well as a louder, breathy call, which is performed in a rapid sequence, sounding somewhat like a steam engine. The female has a far noisier raucous quack that frequently sounds in aggression when tending her young. The male Egyptian goose attracts its mate with an elaborate, noisy courtship display that includes honking, neck stretching, and feather displays.

== Distribution ==
The Egyptian goose is native to sub-Saharan Africa and the Nile Valley, where it is widespread and common to abundant, though it has become scarce in the northern Nile Valley. It is found in open or semiopen habitats, typically near fresh water, ranging from lowlands to 4,000 m (13,000 ft) above sea level in the Ethiopian Highlands and largely absent from dense forests and deserts. While not breeding, it disperses somewhat, sometimes making longer migrations northwards into the arid regions of the Sahel and occasionally even reaching the North African nations of Algeria and Tunisia, historically a more frequent part of its range.

It was found in southeastern Europe (north to the lower Danube Valley and southern Hungary) until the early 1700s and in parts of Turkey and the western Middle East until the early 1900s (and has since re-established through escaped captives), but its historical ranges in these places is known incompletely and the reason for the disappearances also is unknown.

=== Introduced populations ===
==== United Kingdom ====
The British populations of the Egyptian goose date back to the 17th century, when it was introduced to estates and parks, though the species was only formally added to the British bird list in 1971. The British introductions were the first outside its native range, but these individuals did not spread widely and are not known to have expanded into other countries. In Great Britain, it is found mainly in East Anglia and various locations along the River Thames, where it breeds at sites with open water, short grass, and suitable nesting locations (either islands, holes in old trees, or amongst epicormic shoots on old trees). During the winter, they are widely dispersed in river valleys, where they feed on short grass and cereals. In the United Kingdom in 2009, it was officially declared a non-native species. Accordingly, Egyptian geese in Great Britain may be shot without special permission if they cause problems.

==== Mainland Europe ====
The Egyptian goose was first introduced to the Netherlands in 1967 and Belgium in 1982, and these formed the basis for the population in mainland Europe, likely supplemented by some captive escapees from other European countries. From these two countries, the species has experienced a relatively fast range expansion into adjacent countries, first spreading into Germany and France (where possibly supplemented by local escapees) in the mid-1980s, and then to the Czech Republic, Denmark, Luxembourg, and Switzerland in the early 2000s. Further observations, sometimes also involving isolated cases of breeding, have been made in Austria, Italy, Poland, Spain, Sweden, and elsewhere in mainland Europe, but it is not yet known to have become established in those countries.

Because of its aggressiveness towards other birds, it may reduce or displace native species, and in 2017, the Egyptian goose was listed as an invasive species in the European Union. Therefore, this species cannot be imported, bred, transported, commercialized, used, exchanged, or intentionally released into the environment, and member states are obliged to try to eradicate the species.

==== Elsewhere ====
In addition to Europe, the Egyptian goose has been introduced and established breeding populations in Mauritius, Israel, the United Arab Emirates, and the United States. In the US, breeding populations are found in Arkansas, California, Florida, Nebraska, Oklahoma, and Texas, with occasional reports of the species elsewhere. Although the Egyptian goose was introduced to Australia and New Zealand, it did not become established in these countries.

== Behaviour ==
This species nests in a large variety of situations, especially in holes in mature trees in parkland. The female builds the nest from reeds, leaves, and grass, and both parents take turns incubating the eggs. Incubation takes 28 to 30 days. Egyptian geese usually mate for life. Both the male and female care for the offspring until they are old enough to care for themselves. Such parental care, however, does not include foraging for the young, which are able to forage for themselves upon hatching.

Egyptian geese typically eat cereal crops, leaves, and grasses, occasionally also eating locusts, worms, or other small animals. Until the goslings are a few weeks old and strong enough to graze, they feed largely on small, aquatic invertebrates, especially freshwater plankton. As a result, if anoxic conditions lead to the production of botulinum toxin and it gets passed up the food chain via worms and insect larvae insensitive to the toxin, entire clutches of goslings feeding on such prey may die. The parents, which do not eat such organisms to any significant extent, generally remain unaffected.

Both sexes are aggressively territorial towards their own species when breeding, and frequently pursue intruders into the air, attacking them in aerial "dogfights". Egyptian geese have been observed attacking aerial objects, such as drones, that enter their habitat, as well. Neighbouring pairs may even kill another's offspring for their own offspring's survival, as well as for more resources.

In their native range, predators of Egyptian geese include leopards, lions, cheetahs, hyenas, crocodiles, and Old World vultures.

== Gallery ==
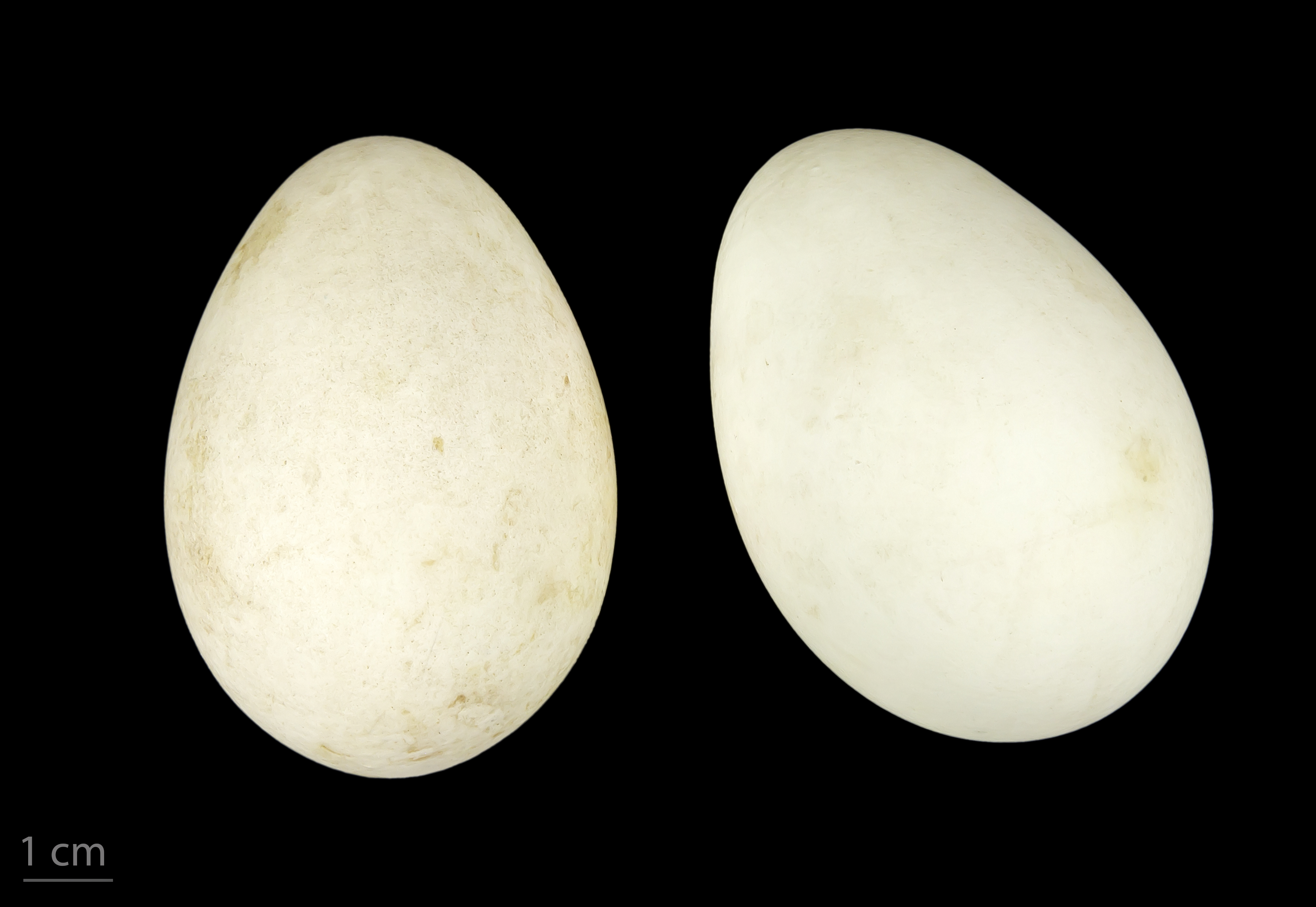
Eggs from a clutch in France

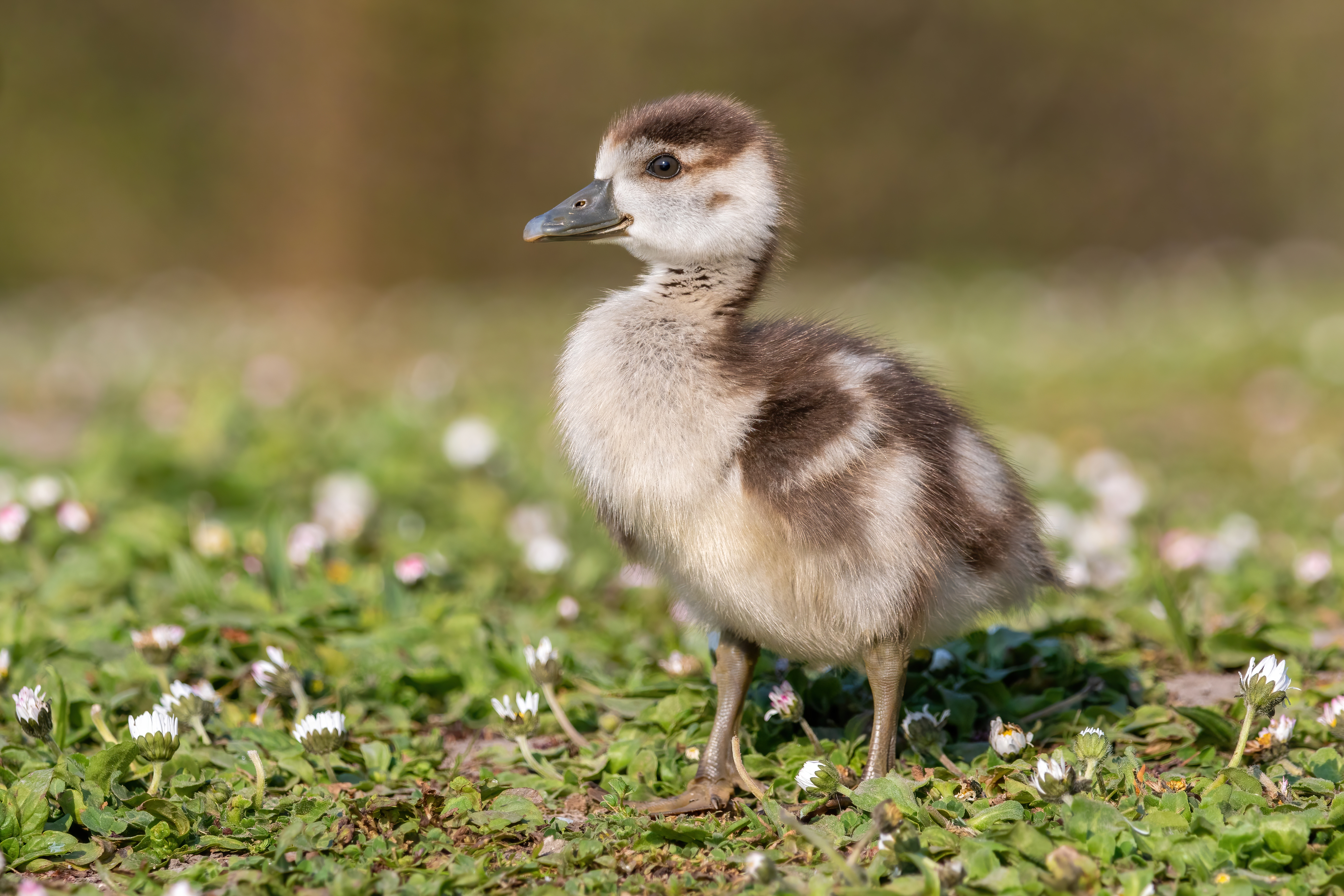
Gosling

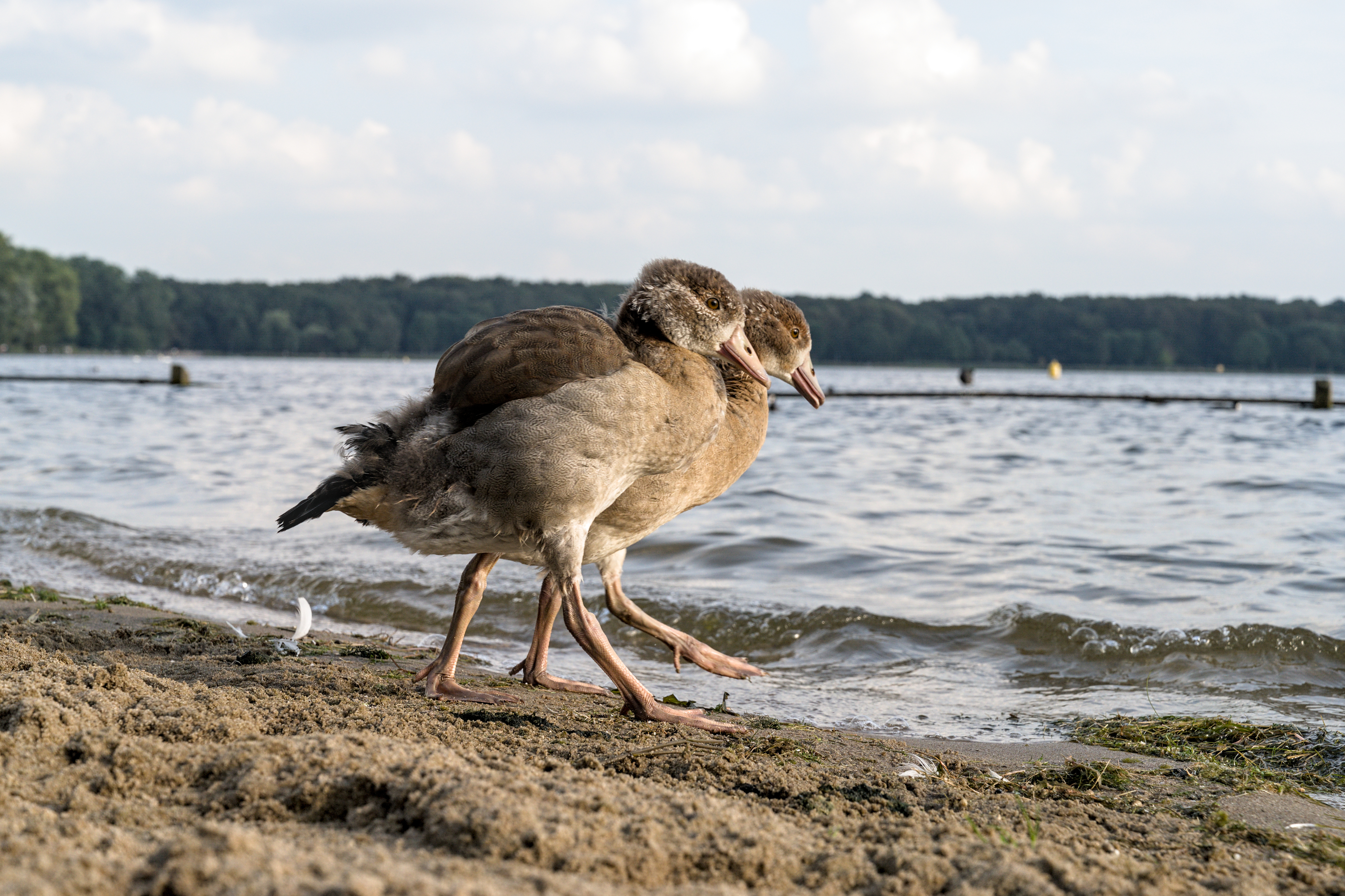
Goslings

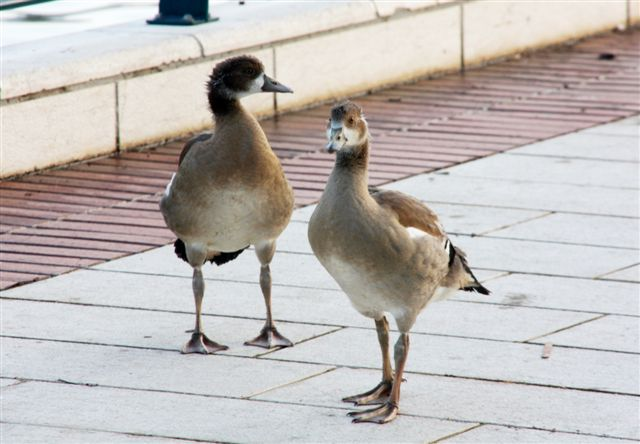
Immature birds

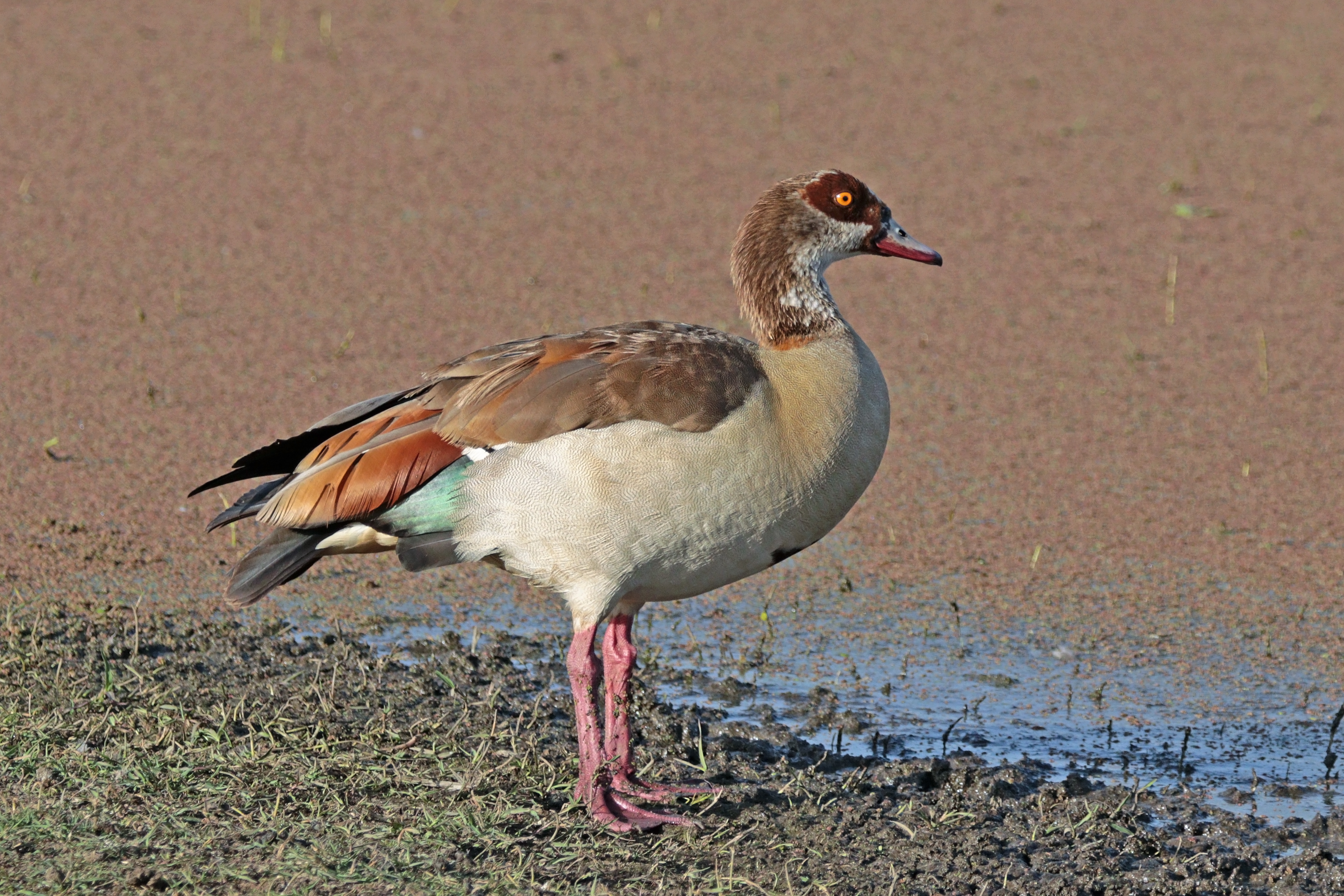
Subadult

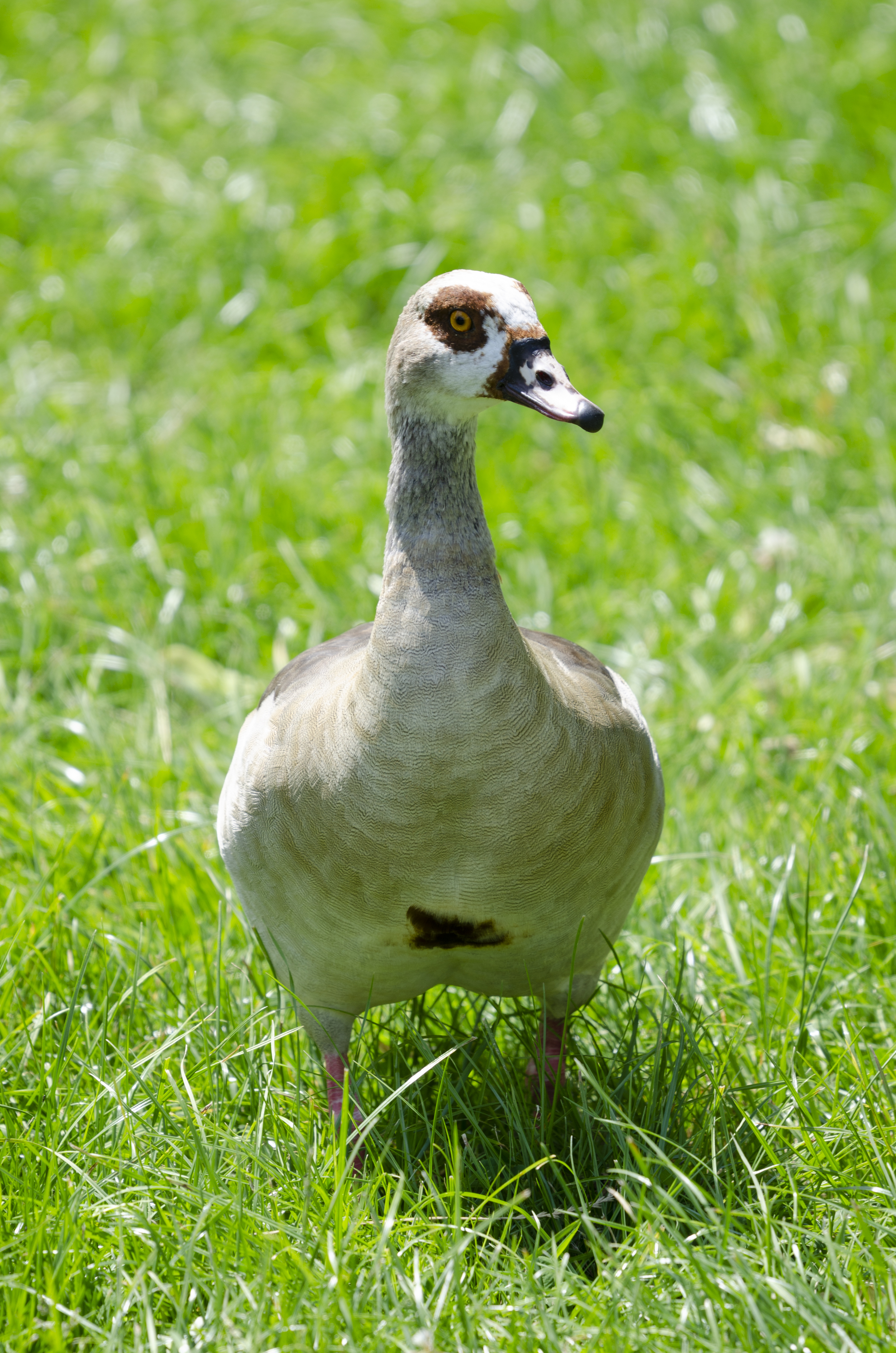
Female from the front

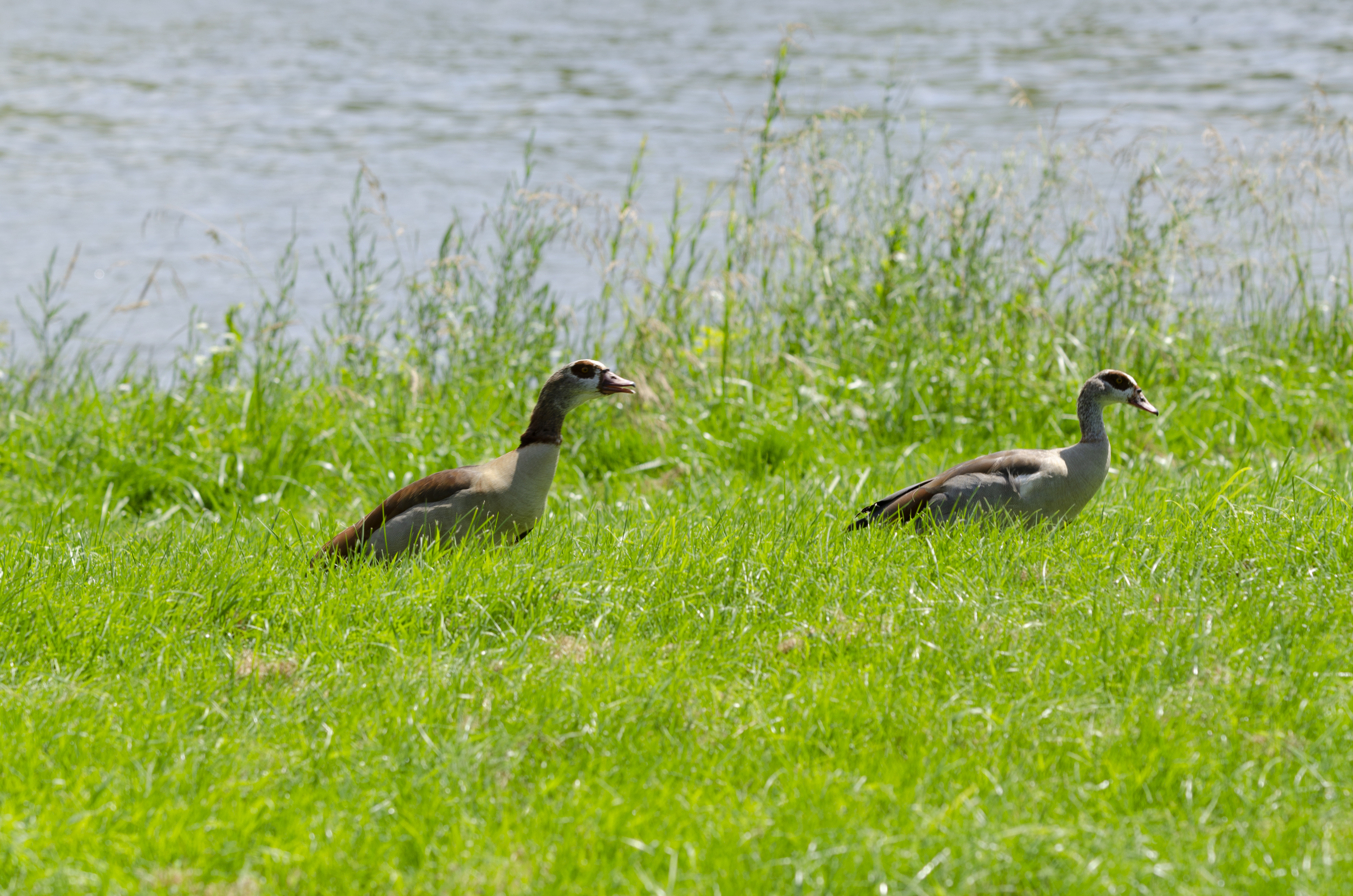
Male (left) herding a female (right)

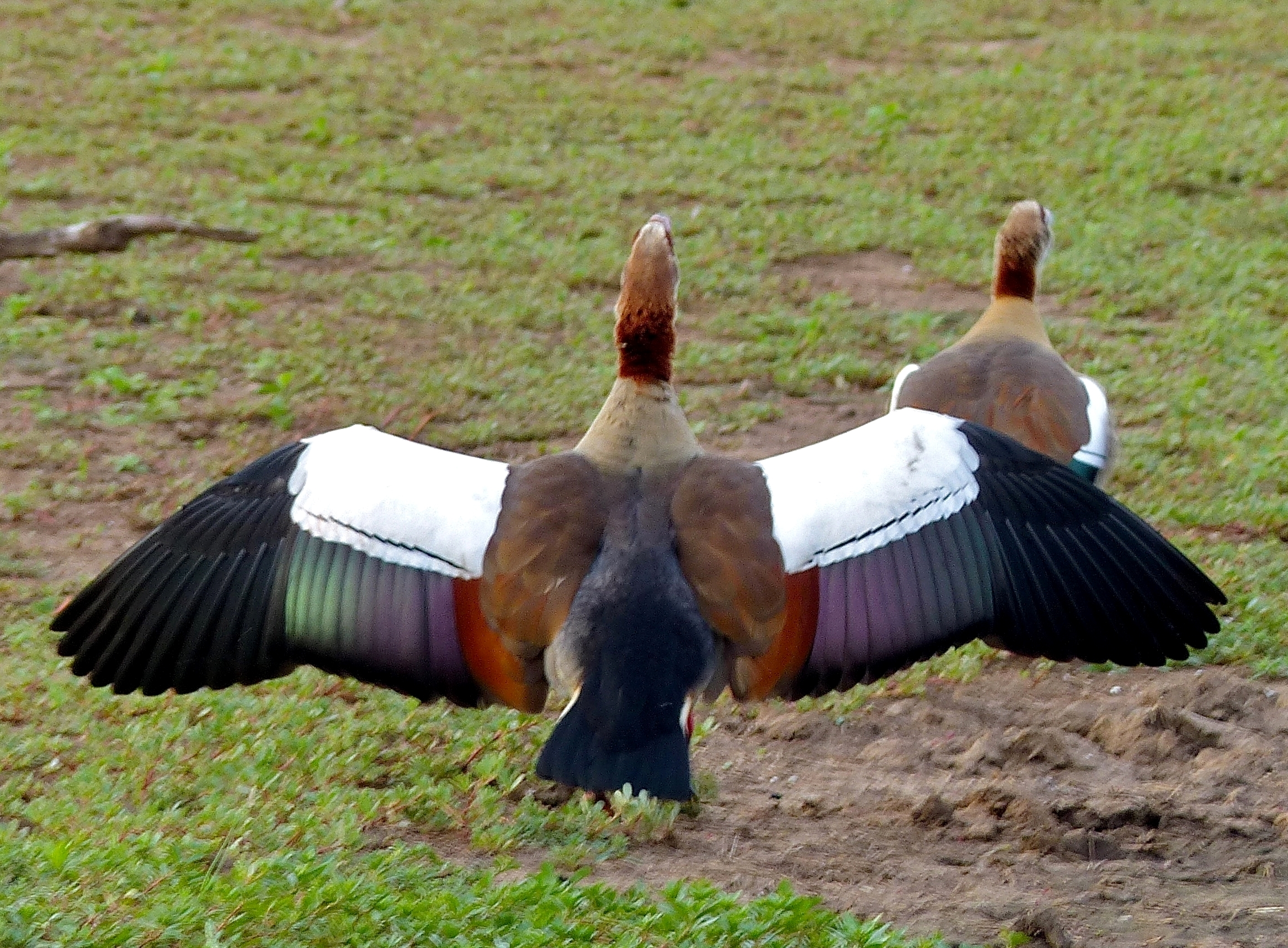
A breeding pair (male closest) in South Africa

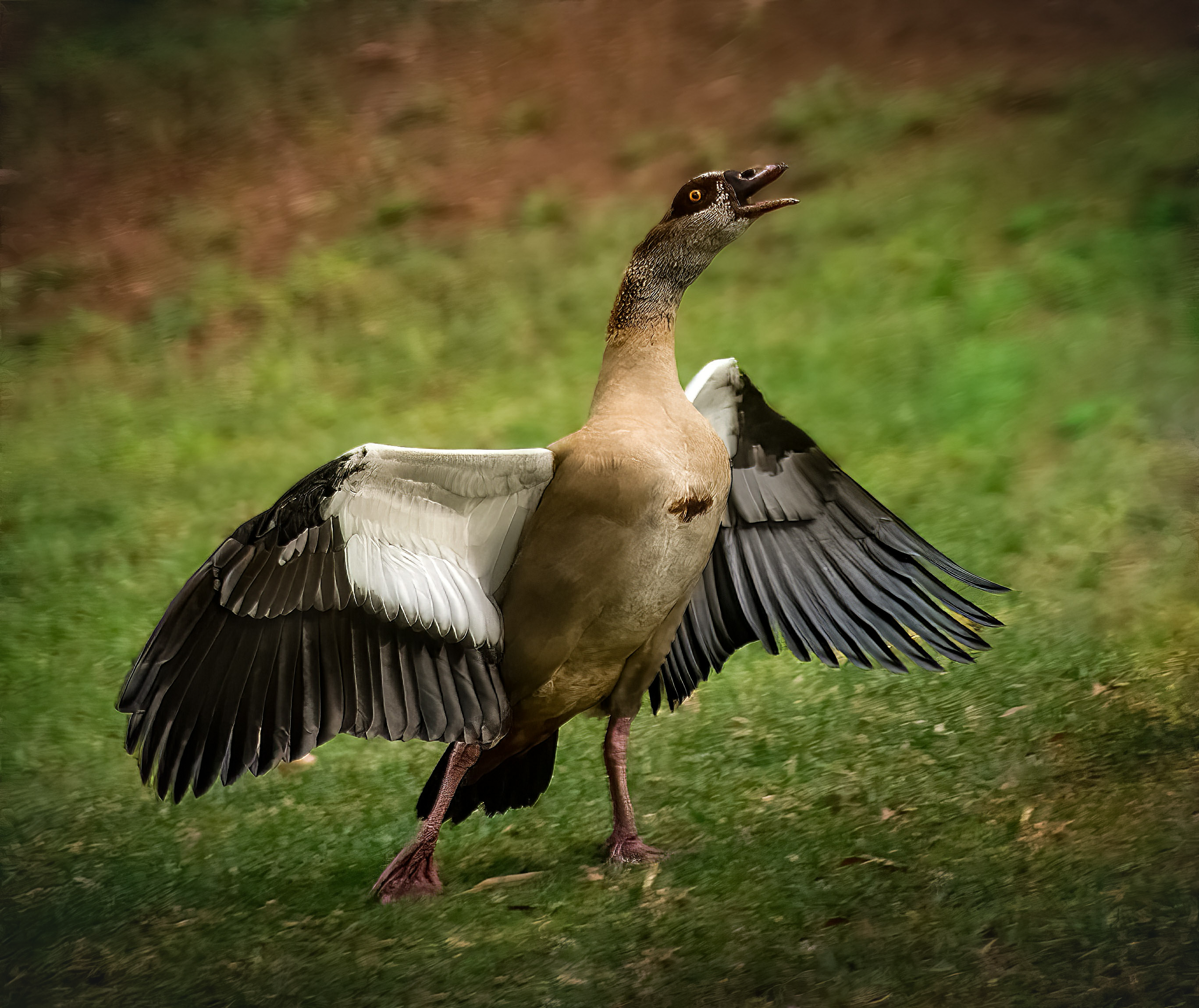
Male from the front, Israel

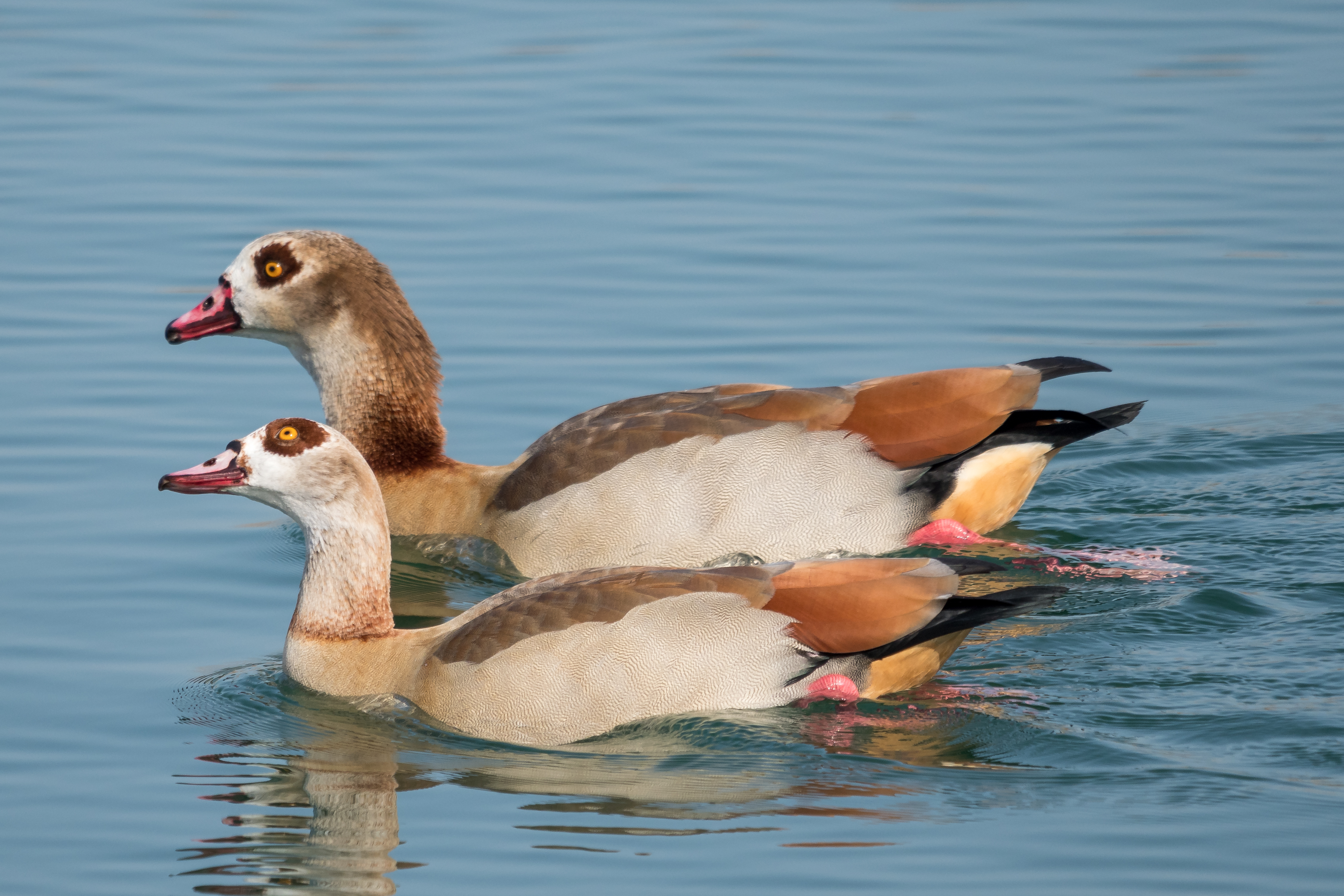
A breeding pair (male behind) in Germany

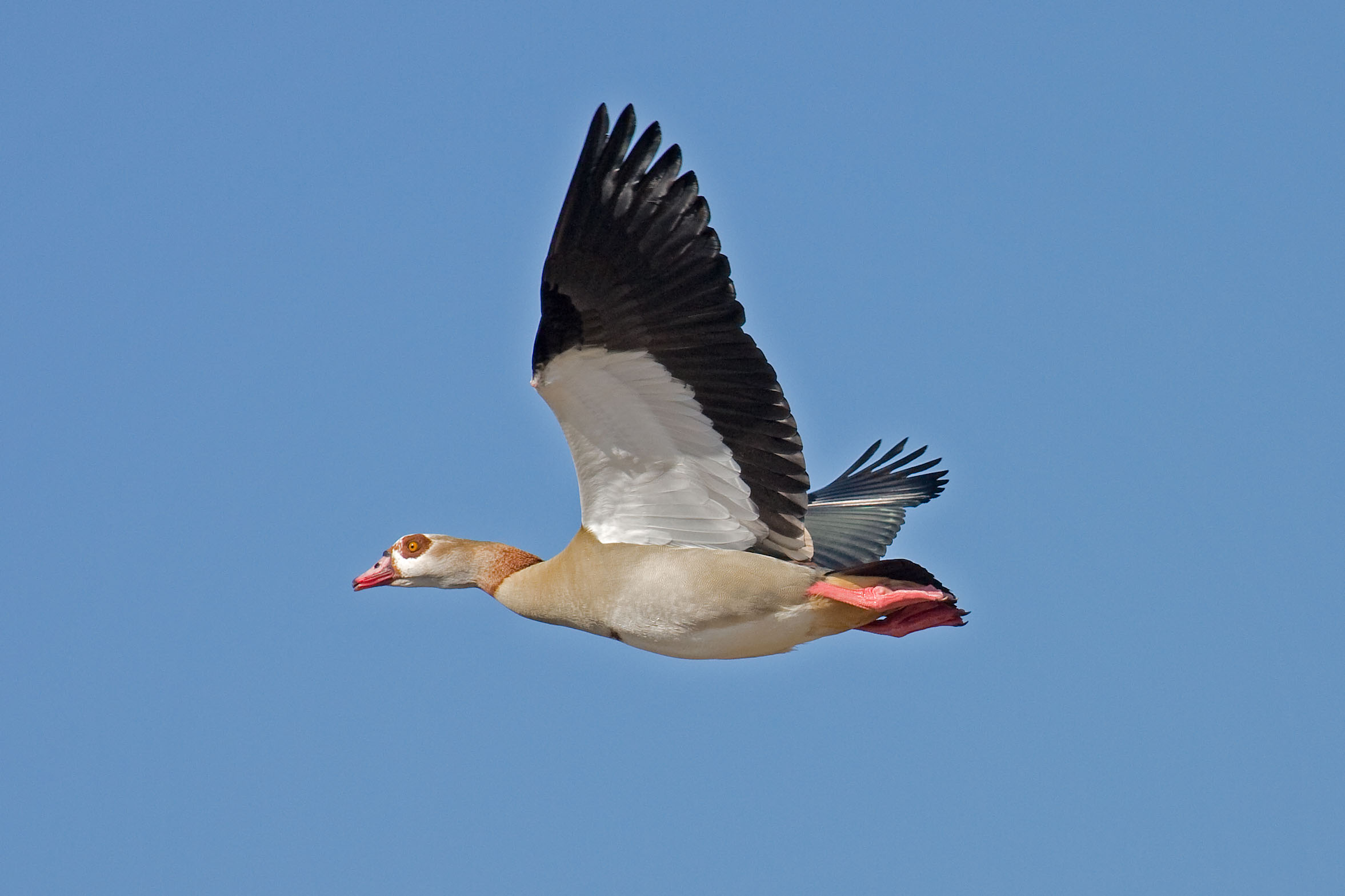
In flight, showing pied underwing

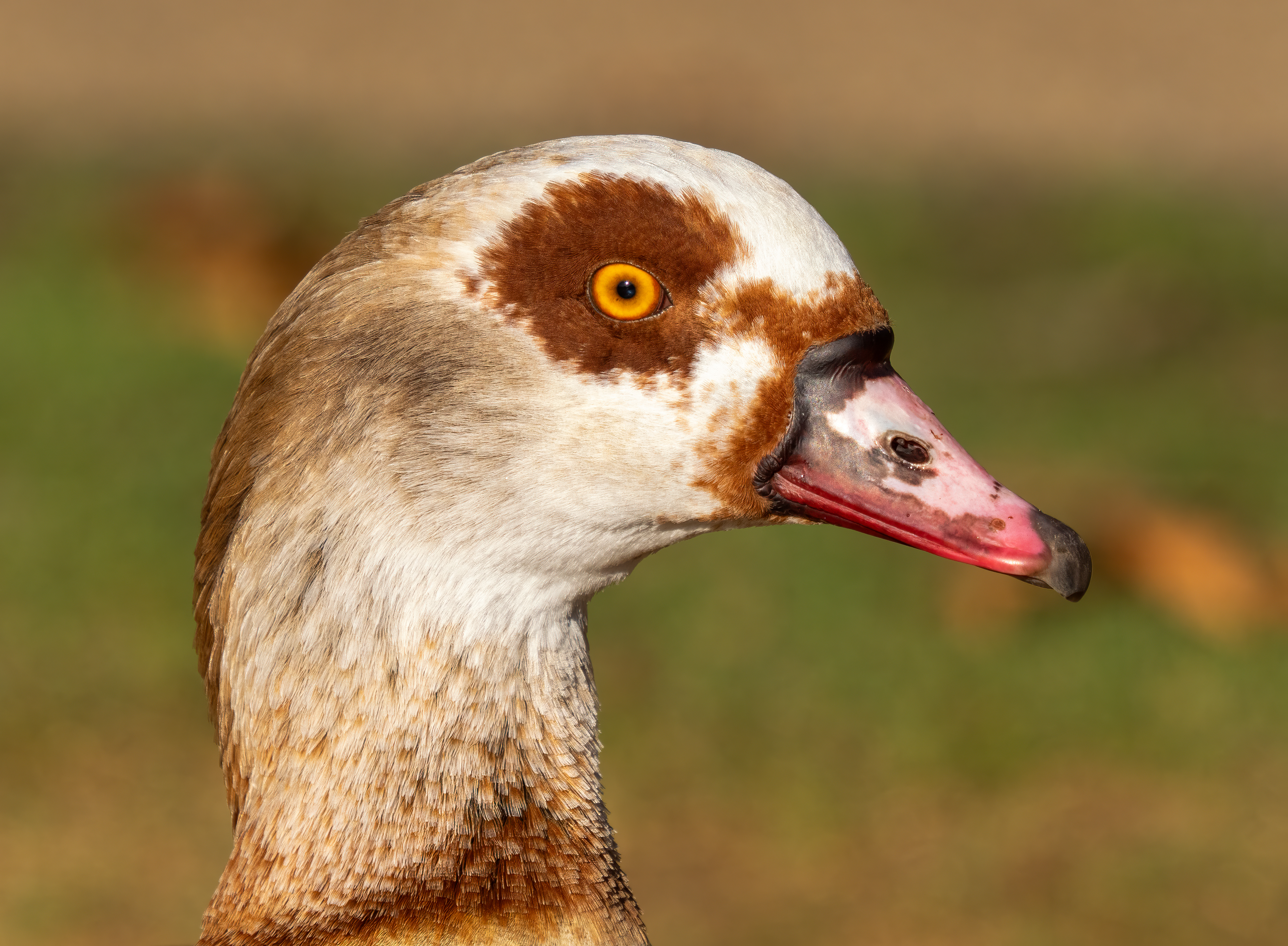
Head, in London

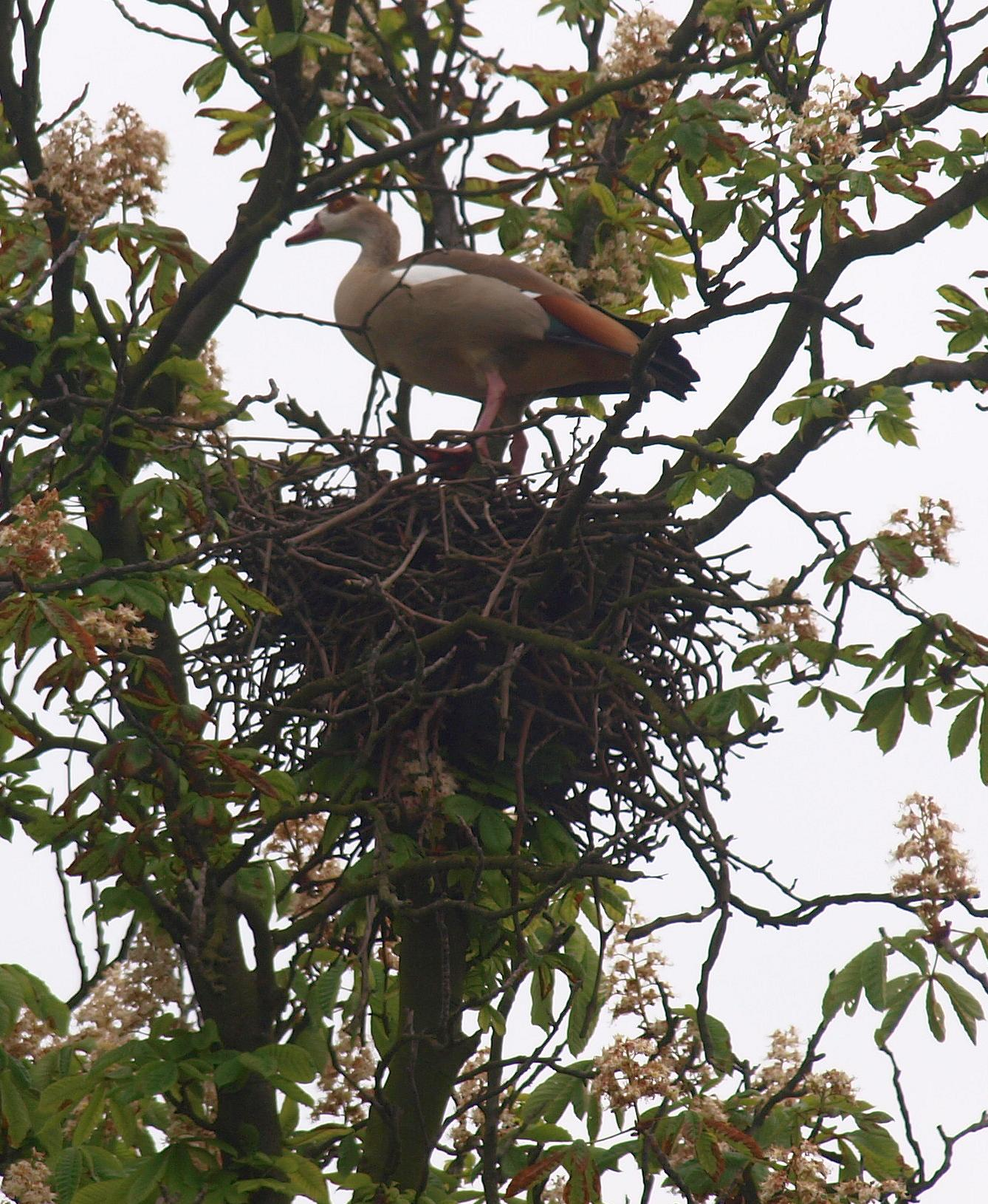
An usurped crow's nest in Germany
