= British White cattle =

British breed of cattle

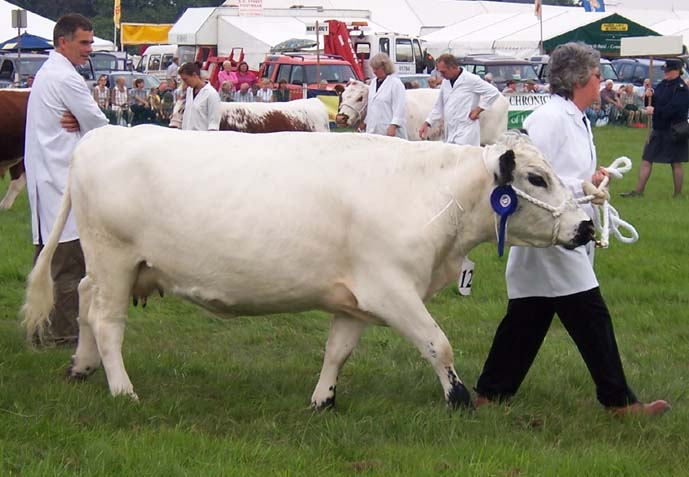
Cow at an agricultural show

The British White is a British breed of beef cattle. It is naturally polled (without horns) and is colour-pointed – white with black or red points on the ears and muzzle. It has a confirmed history dating back to the seventeenth century.

== History ==
White cattle (often with black or red ears) are believed to have been highly regarded in Britain and Ireland in very early times, and herds of white cattle were kept as ornamental and sporting animals in enclosed parks for many centuries. They gave rise to the horned White Park cattle, and contributed to the polled British White. However, British Whites are not as genetically distinct from other British breeds as White Parks are, and so there is some doubt about their exact origins; other breeds such as Shorthorn may have contributed to their development.

These cattle were kept in the Park of Whalley Abbey, in the Forest of Bowland near Clitheroe. After that time the major portion of the herd was moved to Norfolk, in the early 19th century. This herd was sold off in small lots, largely to nobility in the surrounding countryside, and formed the basis of the British White breed. By the early 20th century these cattle had declined to about 130 registered animals, mainly in the eastern counties of England. By the end of the 20th century numbers had grown to over 1,500 registered animals in the UK and perhaps 2,500 in the US, as well as many in other parts of the world such as Australia, where the breed was first imported by Mrs A Horden in 1958. The UK Rare Breeds Survival Trust lists it as a "minority" breed.

In Britain, pedigrees are now maintained by the British White Cattle Society, although in the past British Whites and White Parks formed different sections in the same herdbook.

The British White Cattle Society of Australia governs the breed in that country. Its first Herd Book was published in 1985.

In North America the breed is represented by two separate societies, the British White Cattle Association of America and the American British White Park Association (confusingly, the latter does not cover the horned White Park).

== Characteristics ==
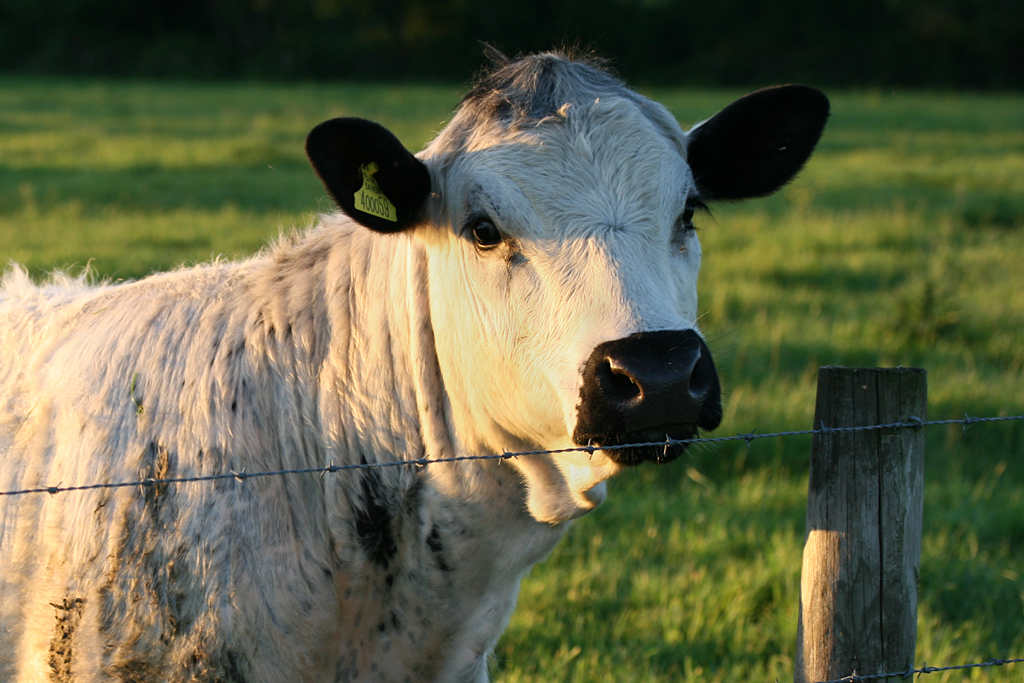
A British White in England

The British White has shortish white hair, and has dark points – usually black, but sometimes red. The coloured points include the ears, feet, eyelids, nose and often even teats. It is naturally polled (hornless), medium-sized and compactly built. There may be some coloured spots on the body fur, and the skin beneath the fur is usually coloured (grey or reddish), or pink with coloured spots. The colour-pointed pattern is found in many unrelated cattle breeds throughout the world – it is an extreme pale form of the similarly widespread colour-sided or lineback pattern.

The red-pointed variant shows in about two per cent of British Whites, but since red colouration is genetically recessive to black in cattle, many of the black-pointed animals also carry the red allele.

The colour-pointed pattern shows strongly in crosses with other breeds, often with additional dark spotting if the other parent was solid-coloured. As in other cattle the polled characteristic is dominant over horns, so first crosses are also polled.

The breed is hardy and thrifty, and the animals readily graze rough vegetation such as rushes, nettles or heather, and they keenly browse many trees and shrubs. They rarely have calving difficulties.

It is a medium-sized breed, with cows usually weighing 550–700 kg and bulls 900–1100 kg.

== Similar breeds ==
- The White Park is very similar to the British White, being white with black or red points, but with white, dark-tipped horns. It is more rangy, and usually has somewhat less spotting and less dark on the points. Related, similarly-coloured types include the Chillingham and Vaynol cattle.
- Swedish Mountain or Fjäll cattle, a dairy type, may be colour-pointed.
- The Irish Moiled is a red colour-sided traditional breed from Northern Ireland, – it may be white with red points, but it is more lightly built and of somewhat more dairy type than most British Whites.
- The Belgian Blue (and its crosses) is often largely white with grey ears, but this heavily muscled, intensive beef breed is of very different type to the British White.
- Holstein cattle may be nearly all-white, and such cattle sometimes have black ear tips; again these intensive dairy cattle are of very different type to the British White.
- The White Galloway is a colour variety of the Galloway with dark points.
