= Vaynol =

Country estate in Gwynedd, Wales

Coordinates: 53.202°N 4.193°W

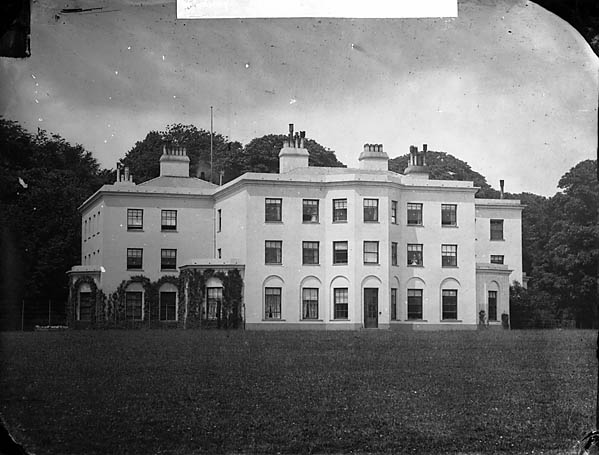
Vaynol Hall, c.1875

Vaynol /ˈveɪnɒl/ or Y Faenol (Welsh [ə ˈveɨnɔl]) is a country estate dating from the Tudor period near Y Felinheli in Gwynedd, North Wales (grid reference SH536695). It has 1,000 acres (4.0 km^{2}) of park, farmland, and gardens, with more than thirty listed buildings, surrounded by a wall which is 7 miles (11 km) long. "Y Faenol" means "the manor" and is a mutated form of the Welsh word maenol.

The buildings on the estate include two Grade I listed halls: Faenol Old Hall, much of which dates from the Williams' period of ownership, and Vaynol Hall, built in 1793 and extended during the 19th century. Once Vaynol Hall was built, Faenol Old Hall became a farmhouse and subsequently deteriorated; in 2003 it appeared on the BBC's Restoration programme, championed by Robert Hardy. In 2009, the BBC revisited the project, and said that Faenol Hall was now "in private ownership and has been restored". There is also a Grade I listed chapel and a very old barn on the site.

The Vaynol estate should not be confused with the neighbouring National Trust land called Glan Faenol.

== History ==
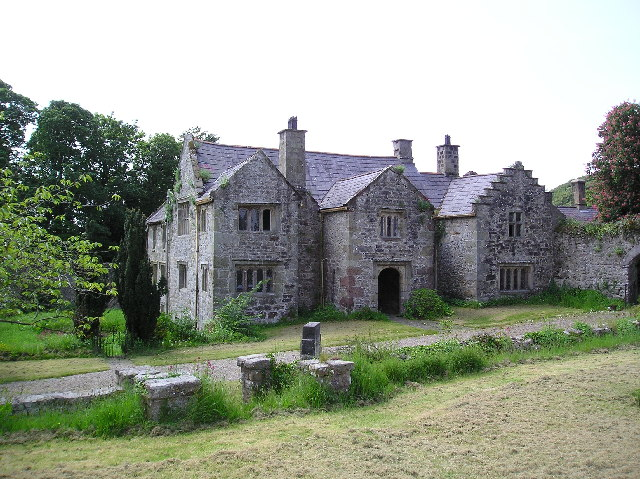
Faenol Old Hall

The estate's origins are in the 16th century, when the bishops of Bangor sold property belonging to their manor, Maenol Bangor. The estate was developed during that century by the Williams family. It passed to the Crown on the death without issue of Sir William Williams, 6th Baronet in 1696. In 1723 it was presented to John Smith of Tedworth, Wiltshire, and in 1762 passed to his nephew Thomas Assheton Smith I (1752–1828). Assheton Smith was later MP for Caernarvonshire and then Andover, and his son, also Thomas (1776–1858) sat for the same constituencies but was known as a cricketer, Master of Foxhounds and owner of steam yachts.

Assheton Smith I was the 3rd largest landowner in Gwynedd. This area of Wales is known for its slate production, and the Assheton Smiths profited from slate quarrying as owners of the Dinorwic Quarry, which made a profit of £30,000 in 1856 (equivalent to £2,572,850 in 2016). Even after farms were let on long leases to encourage good tenant behaviour, slate remained the family's main economic interest. The Assheton Smiths extended their estate through enclosure, despite strong opposition from local farmers, including the enclosure of existing properties at Gallt-y-foel.

The Assheton Smiths remained in possession of the estate until the 20th century. In 1847, it passed to Mary Astley, niece of Thomas Assheton Smith of Vaynol, who married Robert George Duff, a distant cousin of the Earls of Fife. Vaynol passed in turn to their two eldest sons (the first of whom, George William (1848-1904), left no son; his wife and daughter had Snowdon Mountain Railway locomotives named after them) and they took the surname Assheton-Smith instead of Duff. The younger son, Sir Charles Garden Assheton-Smith, was created a baronet in 1911. He sold 30 farms from the estate in 1914. His son and grandson the 2nd and 3rd baronets, reverted to the name of Duff. Sir Michael Duff, 3rd Baronet had an adopted son, Charles David.

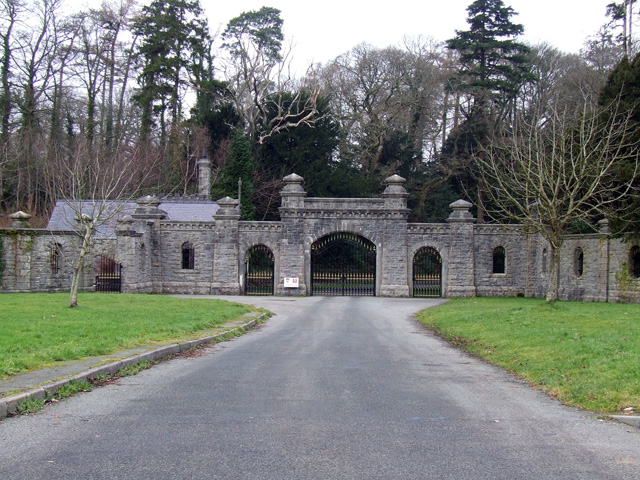
The gates to the Vaynol Estate

At the beginning of the 20th century, the estate amounted to 36,000 acres (150 km^{2}) of land and had 1,600 tenants. The Prince and Princess of Wales (later King George V and Queen Mary) stayed there as guests of the Assheton Smiths during a visit to North Wales in May 1902. To celebrate the 1935 Silver Jubilee of King George V and Queen Mary and to improve Caernarfon, the town walls and some adjoining property, which belonged to the estate, was handed over to the Ministry of Works. The estate's remaining property in Caernarfon was offered for sale in 103 lots in 1957. In 1967 21,000 acres, including the north face of Snowdon, was sold to two property companies, jointly, for a reputed £1½ million. Vaynol, its home farm and some adjacent property were retained by the estate trustees and Sir Michael Duff. The Dinorwic slate quarries at Llanberis, which were owned by a family company, were not sold. Later in the year, the property companies sold 13,000 acres of Snowdon land to the Welsh Office for £140,000. Further properties were sold to tenants and 138 lots were offered for sale by auction in 1968. Sir Michael Duff's obituary claimed that the 1967 sale was forced on him by high taxation.

== Attractions ==
In the second half of the 19th century the park had a zoo, but it was dismantled by 1900. The park has been the setting for Bryn Terfel's Faenol Festival since 2000, and in 2005 it hosted the National Eisteddfod. On 25 August 2006, Irish vocal pop band Westlife held a concert for their Face to Face Tour supporting their album Face to Face. BBC Radio 1's Big Weekend was held at the park in May 2010.

== Vaynol cattle ==
The estate began breeding the rare Vaynol cattle, a type of White Park cattle, in the 1870s. A herd was kept there until the death of the owner Sir Michael Duff in 1980, when the estate was sold and the herd was moved to a series of locations in England.
