= Vaynol cattle =

UK cattle breed

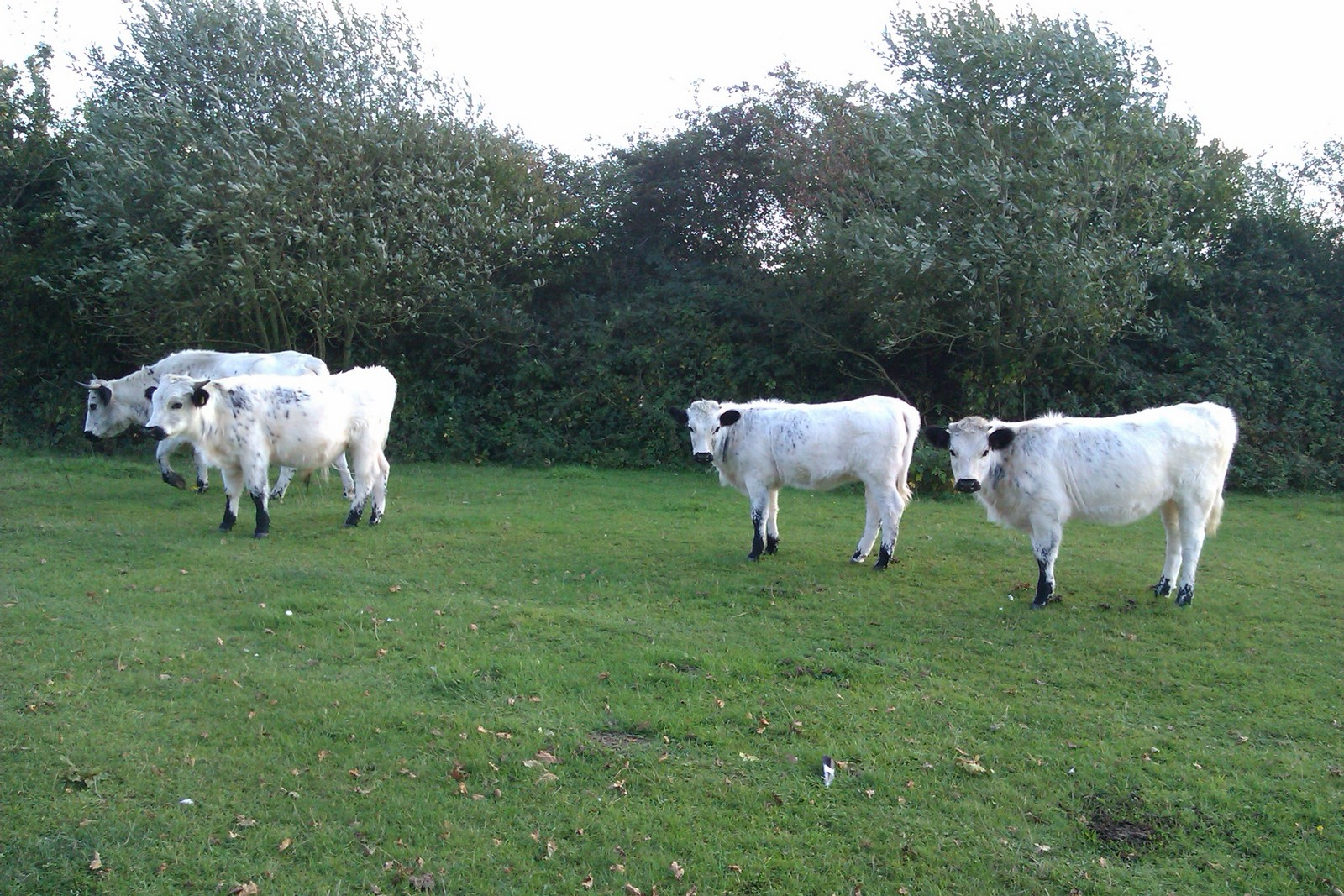
- Conservation status: Critical
- Country of origin: United Kingdom (Wales)
- Use: beef; leather

Traits
- Weight: Male: 400–450 kg (880–990 lb); Female: 300–350 kg (660–770 lb)
- Coat: White with black points on the ears; black
- Horn status: Medium upswept horns

The Vaynol (Welsh: Faenol, pronounced [ˈveɨnɔl]) is one of the United Kingdom's rarest breeds of cattle with fewer than 150 breeding animals registered. The breed is currently listed as “critical” on the Rare Breed Survival Trust list. There are currently three officially registered herds of Vaynol cattle existing in the United Kingdom. Together with the Chillingham and White Park cattle, the Vaynol is one of three horned breeds derived from ancient white parkland herds from Britain and Ireland. These park cattle were also the basis of a similar fourth breed, the polled British White.

== History ==
Vaynol cattle originate from a herd in Wales. The history of the breed dates back over a hundred years, beginning with a semi-wild herd, originally established in 1872 in Vaynol Park, North Wales.

It was kept there until the death of the owner Sir Michael Duff in 1980, when the estate was sold and the herd was moved to a series of locations in England. This type of herd has never existed in large numbers and the present type is descended from a small number of founders. Back in 1989 there was only one existing herd.

Four years later the herd was purchased by the Rare Breeds Survival Trust (RBST) and moved four times in search of a permanent home. The original herd now resides at Temple Newsam Home Farm, West Yorkshire, in the United Kingdom. It is run by Leeds City Council.

The Home Farm, which is open to the public, includes a barn which was built in 1694. It is the largest working rare breeds farm in Europe and the only one of 16 national farms being approved by the Rare Breeds Survival Trust . The Trust is responsible for the herdbook of the Vaynol and owns the majority of the breeding animals. The cattle mainly resides in large green meadows surrounded by barriers, in large estates and national parks. Like closely related breeds such as the White Park and Chillingham cattle, the Vaynol is a remnant of the ancient white cattle that once roamed Great Britain.

In 2009, the Vaynol cattle based at Temple Newsam were separated into two different herds for the first time. Three cows were brought to Lincolnshire, a county located 70 miles (110 km) away from Temple Newsam. The beginnings of a third herd of this breed were formed in 2012 with the support of The Prince of Wales's Charitable Foundation. The donation enabled the RBST to purchase a Vaynol heifer called Templeson Ursula, who together with her sister Una is taken care of by RBST members Derek and Cindy Steen in Scotland.

=== Conservation status ===
Vaynol cattle are one of the United Kingdom's rarest breeds of cattle with less than 150 breeding animals registered in the UK. The Rare Breeds Survival Trust is a UK charity organisation, which aims to conserve and protect national rare farm animals from extinction. These cattle are currently listed as “critical” on the Rare Breed Survival Trust list. The Trust is trying to keep this rare breed alive by organizing the care of the still existing herds. One important measure is the setting in place of various breeding programs to avoid inbreeding, which is very dangerous within such a small number of animals.

In 2006, a five-year conservation programme was started by the Rare Breeds Survival Trust and Temple Newsam in order to establish a genetic profile of the breed. This aims to reduce the levels of inbreeding and is thus an important measure of protection. In 2007, the first calf was born by artificial insemination. The semen used was collected from a bull 30 years ago.

Until relatively recently breeding remained unsuccessful at any other place but Temple Newsam Home Farm. The standards set at Temple Newsam for saving and promoting the UK's livestock heritage have been used as a benchmark for other agencies.

In 2009 a new satellite herd was created at East Torrington in Lincolnshire. This has been a very important step to conserve the future of Vaynol cattle by widening the future breeding stock. The Vaynols live on 15 acres of grazing land owned by Lincoln farmer and RBST Trustees Neville and Maureen Turner. On 23 August 2013 a female calf was born after the mother, Templeson Tania, had been artificially inseminated at East Torrington. There are now 5 cows and 4 heifers plus this new calf at the agisted herd in Lincolnshire.

The third herd, formed in 2012 with help from The Prince of Wales's Charitable Foundation, consists of 4 cows and 2 heifers. They are also likely to take part in the artificial insemination process. Keeping this third herd of Vaynol cattle in Scotland again ensures a wider distribution of the breed, which will help to protect it in the case of an outbreak of serious disease.

== Characteristics ==
This endangered breed is very similar to the White Park. Vaynol cattle are angular in appearance with curved hocks and a sloping rump. They can be white with black points or sometimes completely black. The black is found on the ears, eyelids, hooves, nose, on the point of the horns and they sometimes have black socks. The females can have black teats on their udders. They have long horns, curving outwards and upwards. Bulls weigh from 400–450 kg (880–990 lb) and cows weigh from 300–350 kg (660–770 lb).

The herd has been moved from Vaynol Park and is now being taken care of elsewhere. Vaynol cattle were considered wild in the past, but due to their current endangered status and thus increased contact with humans, they are now considered semi-feral. Their nutritional requirements are low due to the animal's small size and weight. They are classified as upland beef. Their suitability in grazing conservation is described as follows:

- They are a hardy, thrifty breed well suited for use in a wide range of conservation grazing situations.
- Their small to medium size and weight makes them less likely to damage sensitive swards and soft soils.
- They grow slowly and mature late, making it unlikely for them to complete their physical development within the usual 30 month maturation period, unless given supplementary feeding.

== Gallery ==
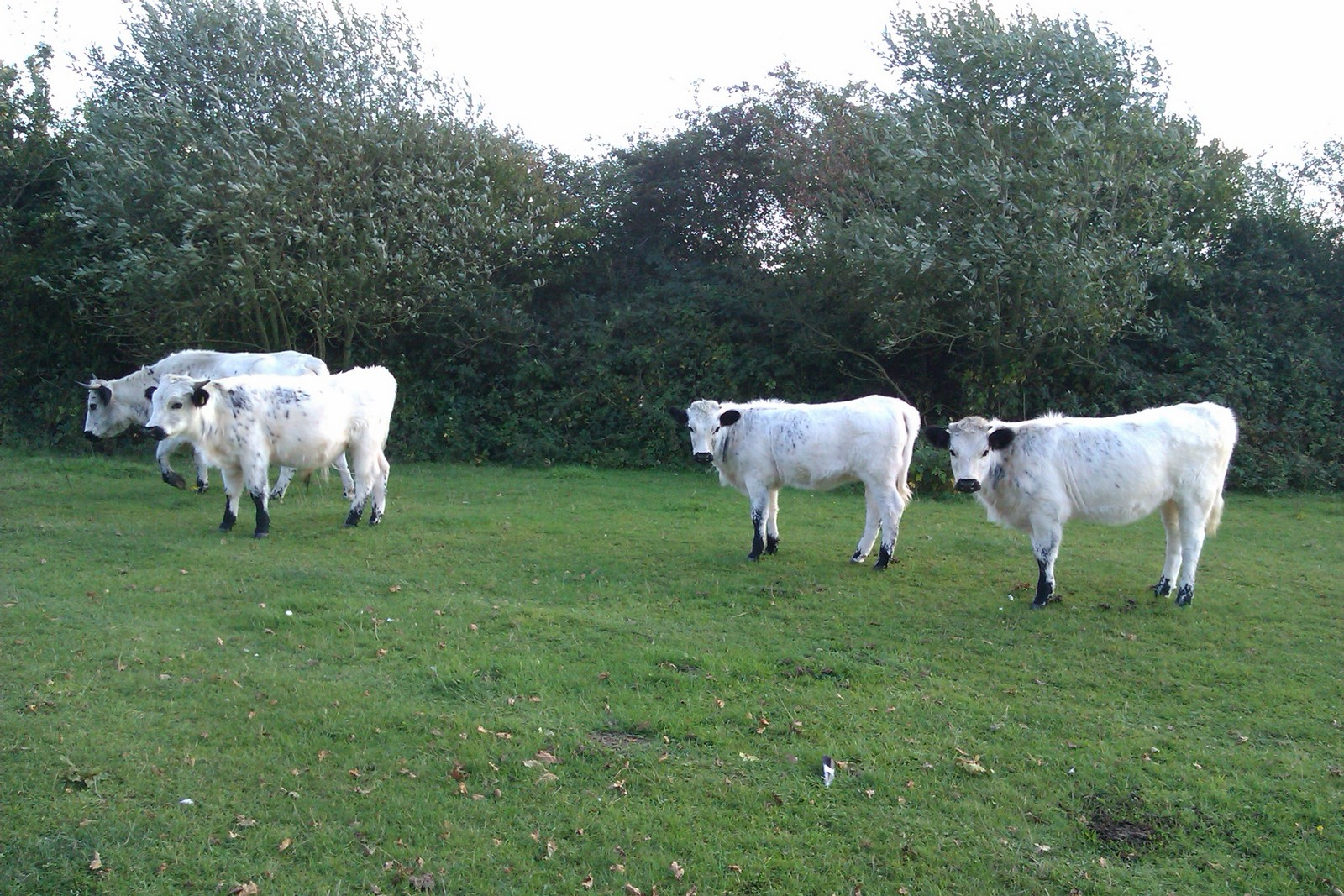
Vaynol cattle in England

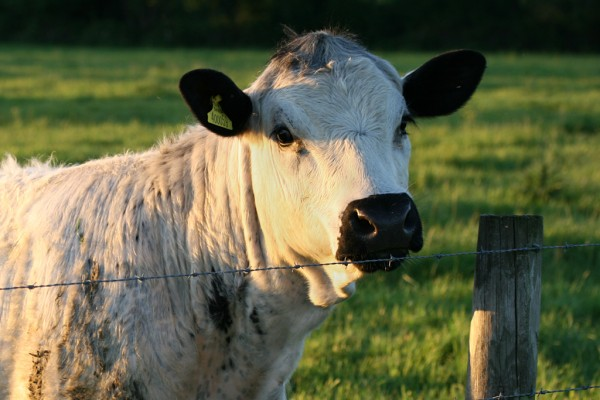
Look of Vaynol cattle

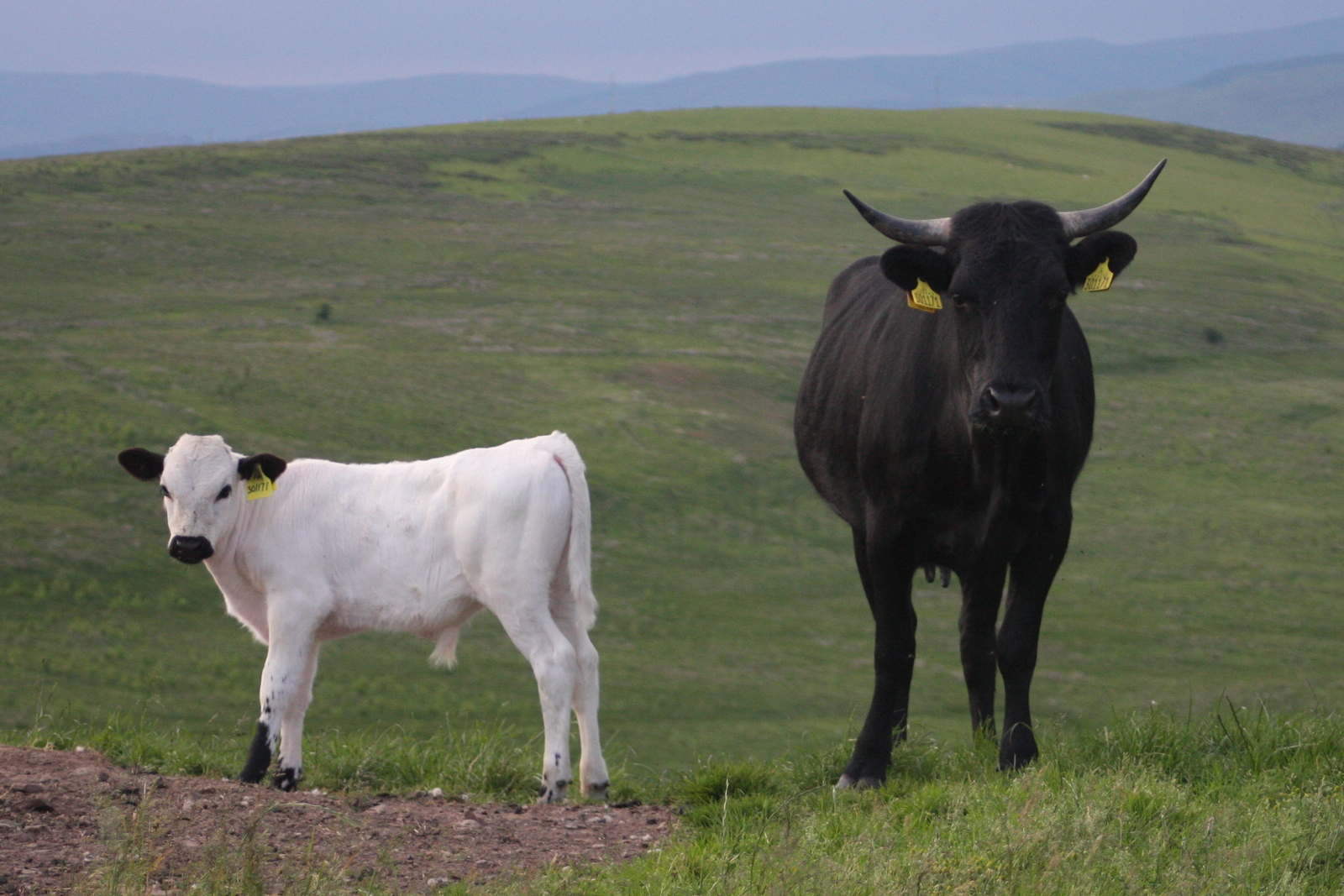
Cow with Vaynol calf in Scotland

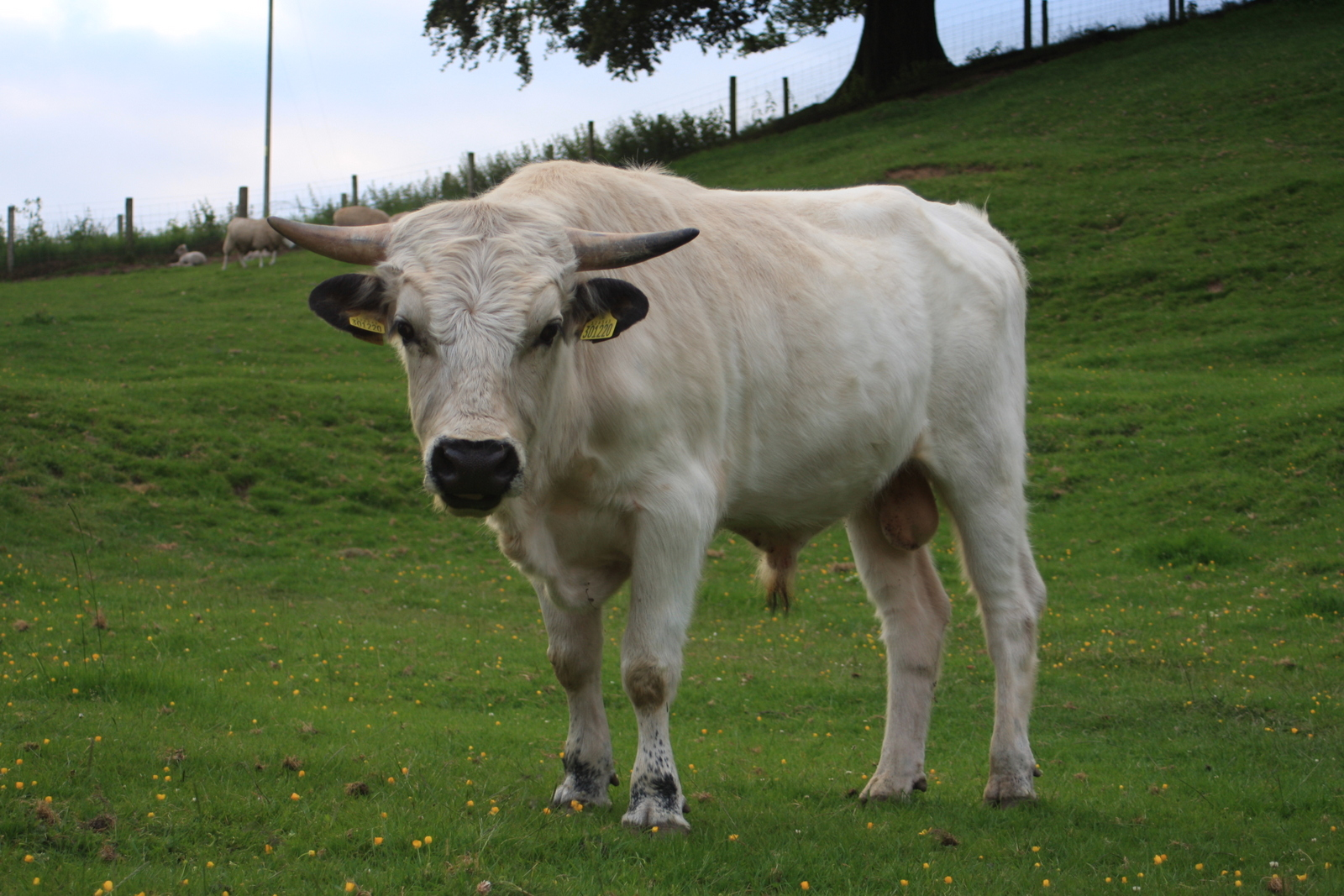
Vaynol bull

== Bibliography ==
- Wilkie, Rhoda M. "Working with Farm Animals from Birth to Slaughter", Temple University Press, 2009.
- Hart-Davis, Duff. "Fauna Britannica: The Practical Guide to Wild & Domestic Creatures of Britain", Orion Publishing, 2003.
- Robinson, Guy M. "Sustainable Rural Systems (Perspectives on Rural Policy and Planning)", Ashgate, 2008.
- Vorwald Dohner, Janet. "The Encyclopedia of Historic and Endangered Livestock and Poultry Breeds", Yale University Press, 2001.
