= Chillingham cattle =

Breed of cattle

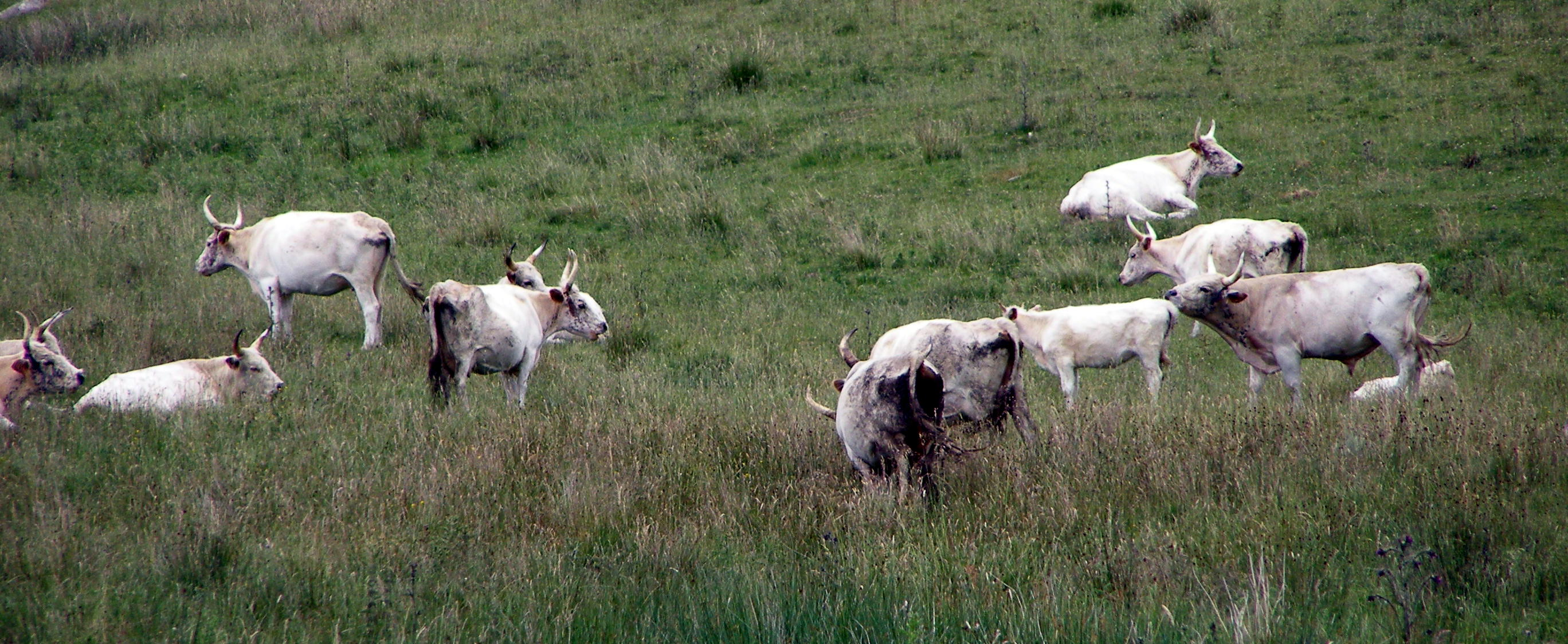
- A portion of the Chillingham cattle herd grazing

- Location within Northumberland
- Location: Northumberland, England, UK
- OS grid: NU074256
- Coordinates: 55.525°N 1.884°W

Chillingham cattle, also known as Chillingham wild cattle, is a breed of cattle that live in a large enclosed park at Chillingham Castle, Northumberland, England. In summer 2022 the cattle number 138 animals with approximately equal numbers of males and females. The herd has remained remarkably genetically isolated for hundreds of years, surviving despite inbreeding depression due to the small population. There is also a small reserve herd of about 20 animals located on Crown Estate Scotland land near Fochabers, North East Scotland.

== Description of cattle ==
The Chillingham cattle are related to White Park cattle, in the sense that the Chillingham herd has contributed to the White Park, though there has been no gene flow the other way. Chillingham cattle are small, with upright horns in both males and females. Bulls weigh around 300 kg (660 lb), cows about 280 kg (620 lb). They are white with coloured ears (they may also have some colour on feet, nose and around the eyes). In the case of Chillingham cattle, the ear-colour is red – in most White Park animals the ears are black (which is genetically dominant over red in cattle). Chillingham cattle are of generally primitive conformation while White Parks are of classical British beef conformation. A brief review of academic studies on the Chillingham cattle is available.

== Description of the Northumberland habitat ==
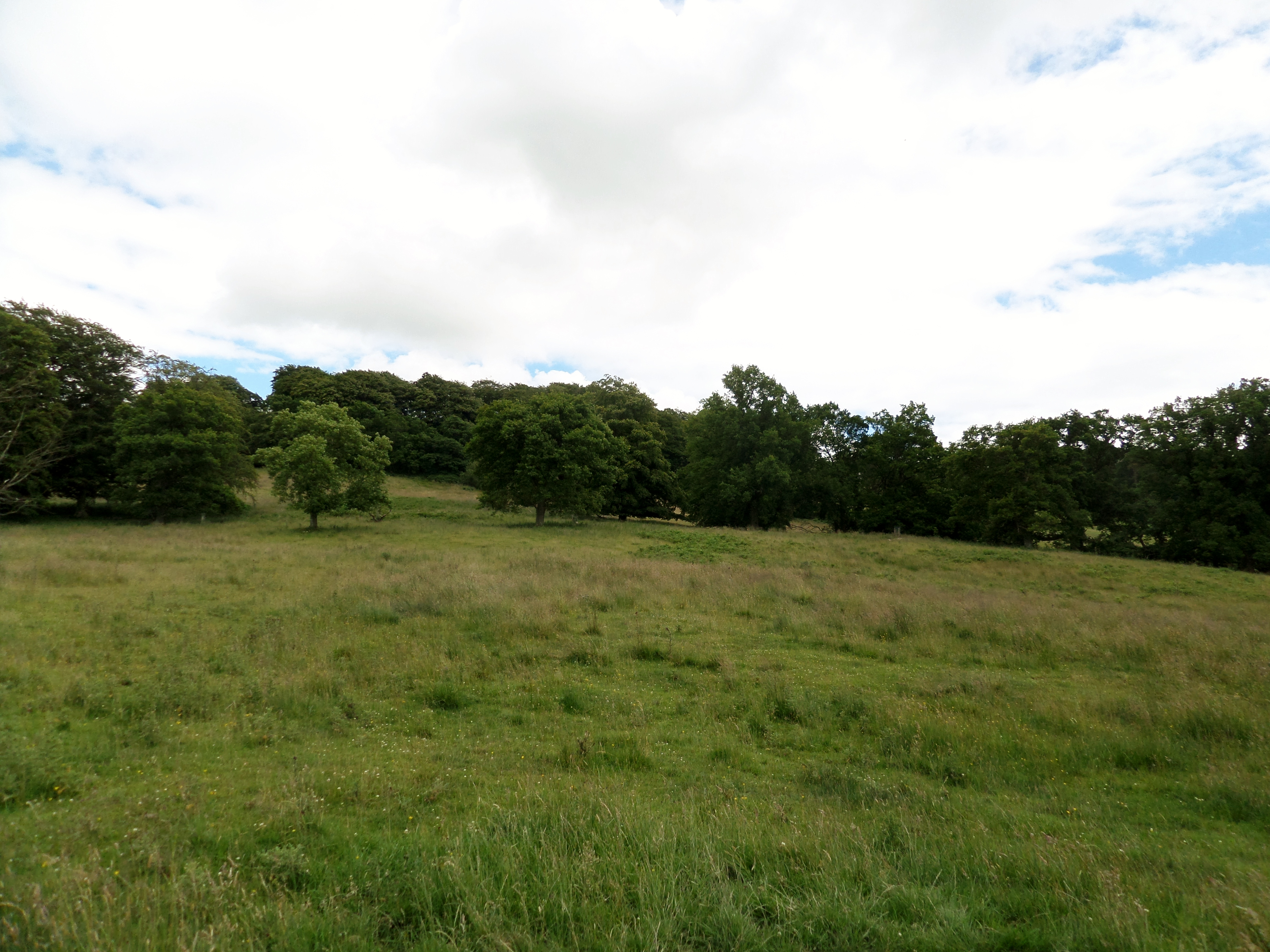
A view of the grazing in Chillingham Park

To many visitors, the most striking element of the historic habitat at Chillingham is the widespread occurrence of large oak trees amongst grassland (wood pasture), providing a glimpse of Britain as many think it appeared in medieval times. However, most of these trees were only planted in the 1780s - early 19th century, and the truly ancient trees of the park are the streamside alder trees, which were probably coppiced in the mid-18th century. They were probably hundreds of years old even then and the stems now growing are themselves around 250 years old. A diversity of plants and animals find a habitat here, due to the absence of the intensive farming found in most other places in Britain.

The Northumberland site is also home to a variety of other species including red squirrel, fox, and badger, as well as roe deer and fallow deer. There are approximately 55 bird species, including common buzzards, European green woodpeckers, and the Eurasian nuthatch which claims this latitude as its northernmost range in the United Kingdom.

An on-site warden at the park leads small groups on foot to find the Chillingham cattle herd; on some days they are evident in one of the easily accessible meadows, while on rare occasions they can be difficult to find without a fair bit of walking, given the tangled woodlands and the amount of space they have for roaming. Just to the east of the park is the summit of Ros Hill.

== Ancestry and history of the Chillingham cattle ==
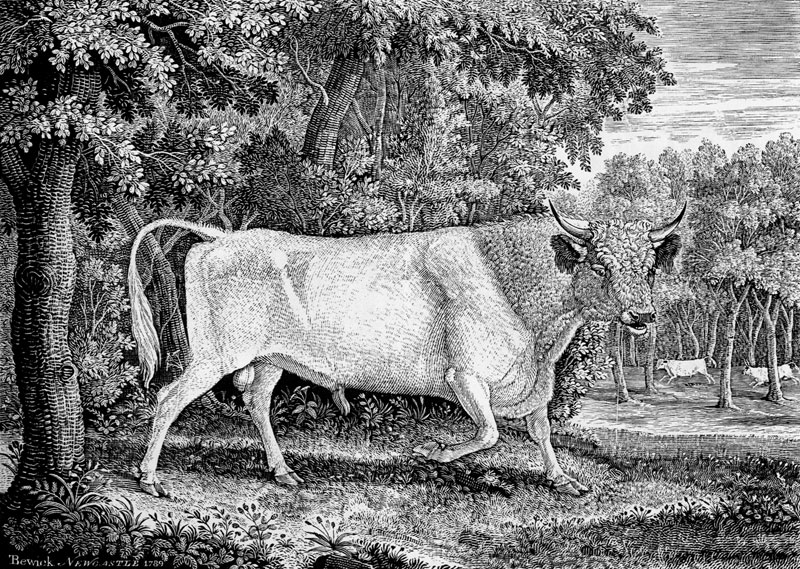
Thomas Bewick’s woodcut of a Chillingham bull

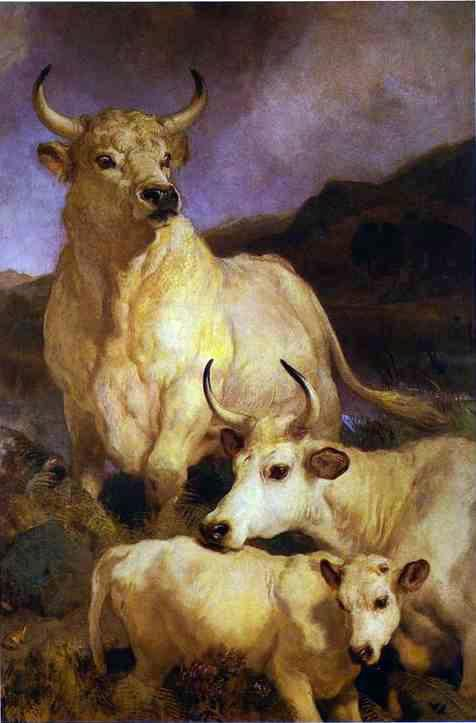
Sir Edwin Landseer: The Wild Cattle of Chillingham (1867, oil on canvas).

According to earlier publicity material produced by the Chillingham Wild Cattle Association, Chillingham cattle bear some similarities to the extinct ancestral species aurochs, Bos primigenius primigenius, based upon cranial geometrics and the positioning of their horns relative to the skull formation. They further claim that Chillingham cattle may be direct descendants of the primordial ox "which roamed these islands before the dawn of history". It is now considered much more likely that they are descended from medieval husbanded cattle that were impounded when Chillingham Park was enclosed. Bones from the present-day herd have been used for comparative purposes by zooarchaeologists, contrasting changes resulting from natural selection in a wild herd (Chillingham) against those from selective husbandry. Nonetheless, much remains unknown about their origin. However, the traditional view that these cattle have an unbroken line of descent, without intervening domestication, from the wild-living aurochs was already being called into question in the 1800s. Over the years a large popular literature has built up relating to the herd, which has been analyzed in relation to prevalent concepts of ownership and attitudes of people towards big, charismatic animals. Simon Schama described the famous contemporary woodcut by Thomas Bewick as "an image of massive power ... the great, perhaps the greatest icon of British natural history, and one loaded with moral, national and historical sentiment as well as purely zoological fascination".

The first written record of the herd dates from 1645, but the Chillingham herd is claimed by some to have been in this site for at least seven centuries. Before the 13th century, this breed is claimed to have "roamed the great forest which extended from the North Sea coast to the Clyde estuary" according to the Countess of Tankerville. During the 13th century, the King of England licensed Chillingham Castle to become "castellated and crenellated" and a drystone wall may well have been built then to enclose the herd. At that time, there was particular concern about Scottish marauders, which explains also the massive build-up of fortification of the nearby Dunstanburgh Castle at the same time.

The wall that visitors see at Chillingham was built in the early 19th century to enclose the 1,500 acres (610 ha) of Chillingham Park. As of 2022, the cattle have 330 acres (130 ha) to roam and the rest of the ground is woodland or farmland.

== Genetics ==
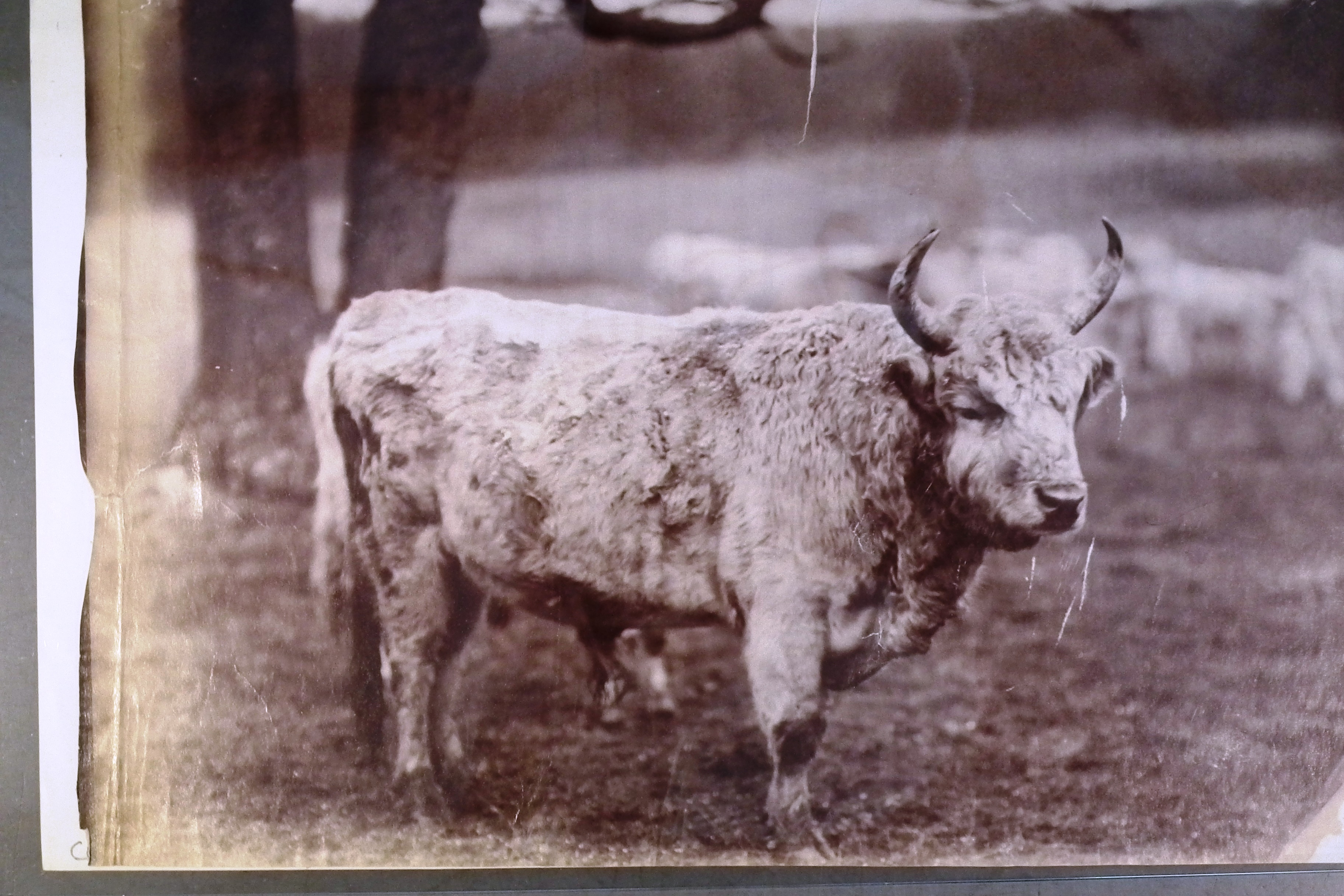
Wild cattle of Chillingham - Photograph c1890

Chillingham bulls contributed genetically to White Park herds in the early 20th century, but the Chillingham herd has remained pure. Some degree of genetic affinity between Chillingham and White Park cattle would therefore be predicted and is supported by genetic studies. Some kinship with Scandinavian cattle has been suggested. On historical grounds they are probably particularly closely related to the Vaynol cattle breed. In Victorian times, the idea that Chillingham cattle had connection with Roman imports was quite widely held but modern genetic studies support earlier archaeological work in rebutting this proposal.

The first genetic work was conducted from the early 1960s when, in connection with the development of blood typing techniques for cattle parentage testing, Dr J.G. Hall of the Animal Breeding Research Organisation (Edinburgh) studied the blood groups of the Chillingham herd. The herd was found to be remarkably homozygous, and this is what would be expected from their long history of inbreeding. This homozygosity is also evident at the level of microsatellite DNA and of single-nucleotide polymorphisms. Mitochondrial DNA is of the same T3 sub-haplogroup as most European cattle though Chillingham cattle do possess certain rare variants; it is not yet clear what the implications are for understanding the history and continuing survival of the breed. In Chillingham cattle there is remarkably little genetic variation in genes understood to be concerned with disease resistance.

== Behaviour ==
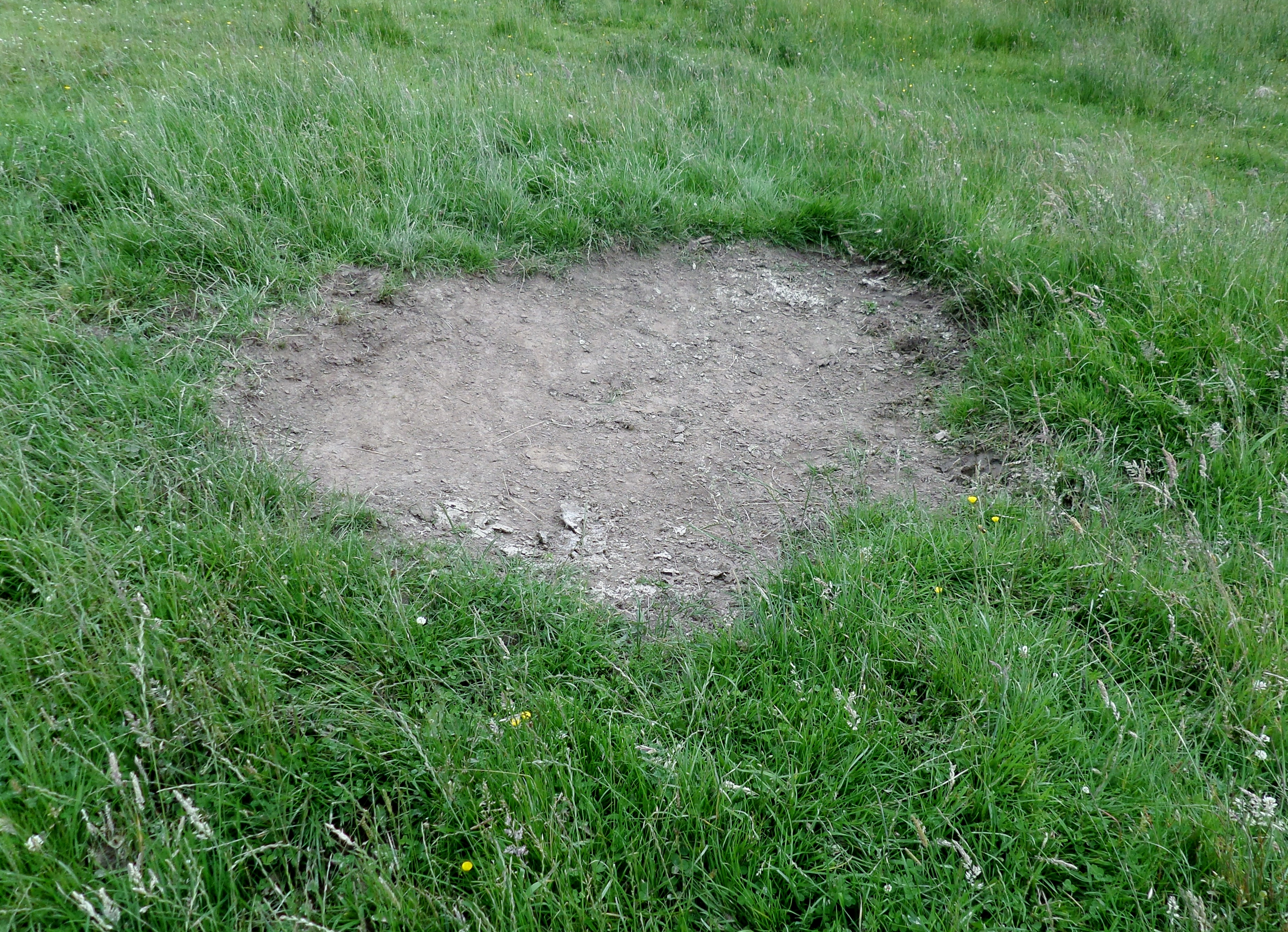
A scrape created by bulls during dominance displays.

The Chillingham cattle herd are not tamed in any way, and behave as wild animals. Their behaviour may therefore give some insight into the behaviour of ancestral wild cattle. In the past there has been conflation of the terms "tamed" and "domesticated" and while these cattle are descendants of domesticated animals, there is no handling or taming of individuals. The term "wild" as applied to the Chillingham cattle reflects this conflation but is firmly established historically.

They breed all year round and this has clear effects on the detailed structure of their behaviour and bulls occupy and share "home territories" with other members of the herd, and with two or three, or more, other bulls. Home ranges overlap, and are not thought of as defended territories although bulls participate in sparring matches with their home range partners. Studies during winter hay feeding showed that at this time when the cattle were forced into close proximity, cows had a complex social structure apparently based on individual pairwise relationships, while bulls had a linear hierarchy or "peck order". Those studies were made many years ago and the feeding system now in operation does not bring the cattle into such close proximity. The cattle are extremely vocal with characteristic calls which echo around the area, especially when the bulls are excited by the discovery that a cow is coming into season.

Traditionally, the herd has been regarded as having a "king bull" system whereby one bull sires all calves during the period of his "reign" which lasts maybe 2–3 years until he is deposed, usually violently, by a challenger. While this may well have been the case when herd numbers were low, it is less likely to have been in effect when the herd has been numerous. Such a system has been claimed to have restricted inbreeding by preventing a bull from mating with his daughters but such an effect would have been very slight over the 67 generations which is the minimum duration over which inbreeding is likely to have taken place. There is evidence of testicular hypoplasia which might suggest male subfertility.

== Inbreeding ==
It is suggested that by a stochastic process of continual mild inbreeding, lethal recessives have been removed from the herd by genetic purging. A classic example reports how of 20 lines of lab mice subjected to 20 generations of inbreeding, all but one died out. It is presumed that in that surviving line, all lethal alleles had been purged and inbreeding was 99%. The Chillingham situation appears analogous; in other studies the persistence of runs of SNP heterozygosity has been taken to imply balancing selection at some loci.

== Modern history ==
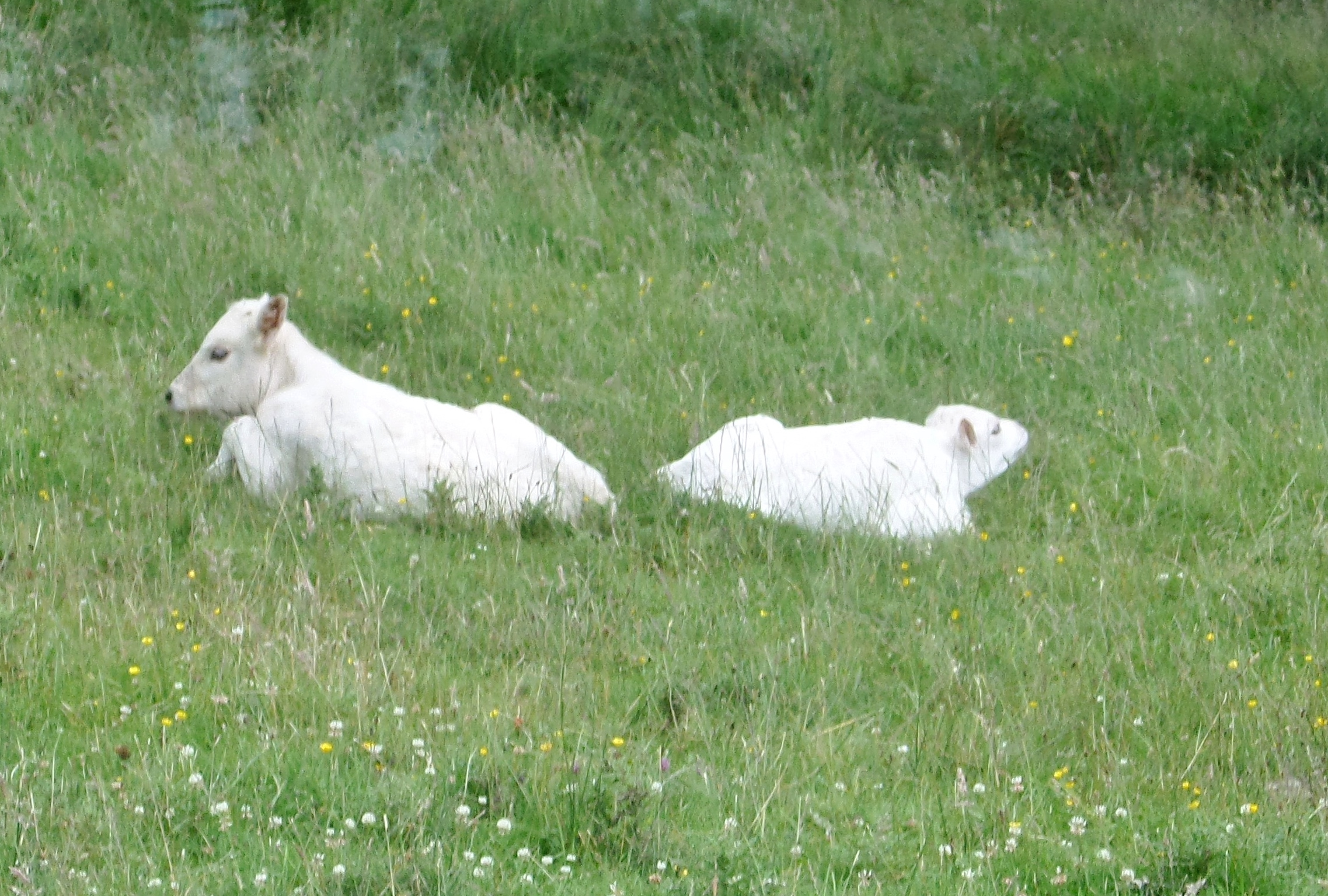
Chillingham wild cattle calves.

In 1939, the Chillingham Wild Cattle Association Limited was formed to study and protect these special creatures; in 1963 it became a registered charity. However the herd's population decreased, and reached a minimum in the unusually hard winter of 1946-1947, which only 13 animals survived. Upon the death of Lord Tankerville in 1971 the Chillingham herd was bequeathed to the Association; however, when the estate was sold in 1980, with the help of Duke of Northumberland the park was purchased by the Sir James Knott Trust (a philanthropic organisation dedicated to protecting Northumberland for the benefit of all). It was then managed by the Knott Trust's agents: College Valley Estates (CVE). CVE granted a 999-year lease of the park to the association. In 2005, after a fund-raising campaign, the association purchased the park and surrounding woodlands. Thus, the herd and the park were reunited under the same ownership. Soon after, the association was able to purchase the sheep grazing rights, which were owned by a neighbour. The flock was removed, and this means a programme of remediation of the pasture and trees can be put into effect.

These cattle have a rather unusual status, being of a husbanded species but living as a wild animal. As being of the bovine species, they would be culled if they contracted foot-and-mouth disease. Special considerations apply to health monitoring and maintenance of biosecurity is a matter of the highest priority.

In March 2015, the herd numbers about 100 animals, approximately equal numbers of males and females. As a result of the absence of sheep since 2005, pasture is abundant in summer and fertility rates and body weights are increasing. Under such conditions, the tendency for better male survival is as predicted (work in preparation). There is also a small reserve herd of about 20 head located on Crown Estates land near Fochabers in north-east Scotland. News about the herd, and further information, is posted at the website of the Chillingham Wild Cattle Association.

== Other herds of white cattle ==
The first list of herds of park cattle was compiled by Thomas Bewick in his A General History of Quadrupeds of 1790; Chartley, Chillingham, Gisburne, Lyme Park and Wollaton. Cadzow (Chatelherault) was not included. There is much vagueness over the history of many, perhaps most, of these and of the other herds of white park type. A detailed review of the situation was conducted in 1887 by the British Association for the Advancement of Science, but the best known general account is still Whitehead's The Ancient White Cattle of Britain and their Descendants. In 1759 the Earl of Eglinton formed a herd of the ancient breed of white or Chillingham cattle at Ardrossan in North Ayrshire, Scotland, probably using stock from the Cadzow Castle herd. The numbers dropped and in 1820 the remaining animals were dispersed. All the animals in this herd were hornless.

== See also ==
- Aurochs
- Caledonian Forest
- White Park cattle
- Vaynol cattle

== Sources ==
- White, John Talbot (1973). The Scottish Border and Northumberland. London: Eyre Metheun. ISBN 0 413 30270 9.
