= List of Swedish cattle breeds =

This is a list of the cattle breeds considered in Sweden to be wholly or partly of Swedish origin. Some may have complex or obscure histories, so inclusion here does not necessarily imply that a breed is predominantly or exclusively Swedish.

Local name	English name, if used	Notes	Image
Allmogekor^{[3]}		grouping of traditional breeds	
Bohuskulla^{[3]}			
Fjällnära Boskap^{[1]}			
Herrgård^{[1]}		extinct, merged into Swedish Red Pied between 1892 and 1928^{[2]}	
Ringamålako^{[1]}^{[2]}			
Rödbrokig Svensk Boskap^{[1]}	Swedish Red Pied	extinct, merged into Swedish Red-and-White in 1927/1928^{[2]}	
Skåne^{[1]}		extinct, merged into Swedish Red Pied between 1892 and 1928^{[2]}	
Smålandsko^{[1]}		extinct, merged into Swedish Red Pied between 1892 and 1928^{[2]}	
Svensk Fjällras^{[1]}^{[2]}			
Svensk Jersey^{[1]}^{[2]}	Swedish Jersey		
Rödkulla^{[2]}	Swedish Red Polled		
Svensk Kullig Boskap (SKB)^{[1]}^{[2]}	Swedish Polled		
Svensk Lågland^{[1]}^{[2]}	Swedish Friesian		
Svensk Röd och Vit Boskap (SRB)^{[1]}^{[2]}	Swedish Red-and-White		
Väneko^{[1]}^{[2]}			
