= Swedish Red =

Swedish Red or Swedish Red Cattle may refer to any one of several red Swedish cattle breeds, including:

- Swedish Red-and-White (Swedish: Svensk Röd och Vit Boskap or SRB), a dairy breed
- Swedish Red Pied, (Swedish: Rödbrokig Svensk Boskap or RSB), a former dairy breed now merged into the above
- Swedish Red Polled, (Swedish: Rödkulla), a traditional dual-purpose breed
