= Väneko =

Swedish breed of cattle

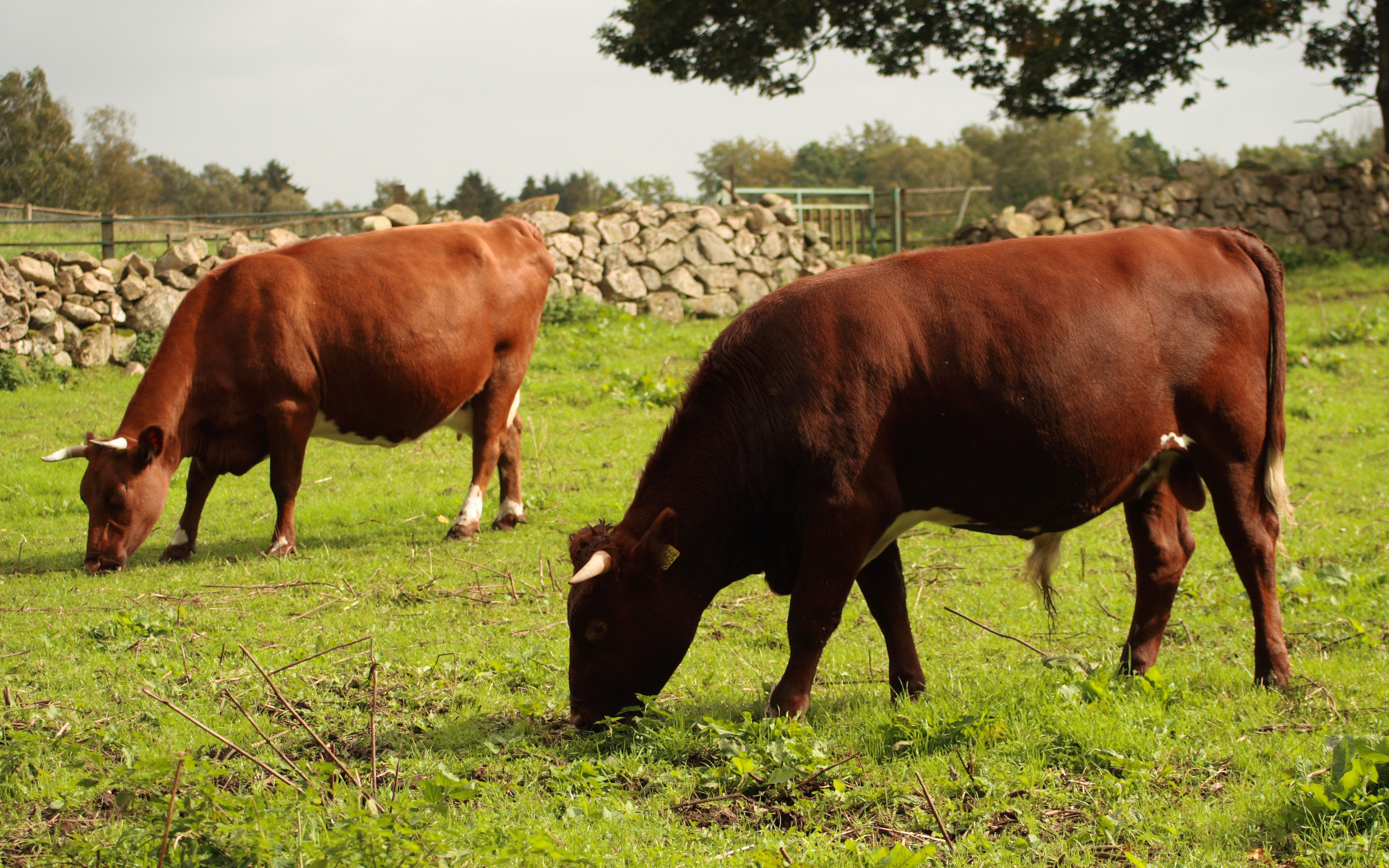
- Cow and bull in the Skånes Djurpark, Höör, Skåne
- Conservation status: FAO (2007): endangered-maintained
- Country of origin: Sweden
- Use: milk

Traits
- Weight: Male: 775 kg; Female: 525 kg
- Coat: black, red and white
- Horn status: horned in both sexes
- Cattle; Bos (primigenius) taurus

The Väneko is an endangered Swedish breed of dairy cattle. It is named for the village of Väne-Ryr in the landskap of Västergötland, in western Sweden. It is a traditional domestic Swedish breed, and derives from a group of cattle discovered in the 1990s, at a time when all traditional Swedish horned cattle were thought to have disappeared.

== History ==
The Väneko is a traditional domestic Swedish breed. It is named for the village of Väne-Ryr in the Vänersborg Municipality of Västra Götaland, in the landskap of Västergötland in western Sweden.

It derives from a group of cattle discovered in the 1990s, at a time when all traditional Swedish horned cattle were thought to have disappeared. There is a programme of recovery and conservation of the breed. A herd-book was established in 1993.

The Väneko is grouped with two other endangered indigenous cattle breeds, the Ringamålako and the Bohuskulla, as Allmogekor, or roughly "Swedish native cattle". Conservation and registration of these populations is managed by a society, the Föreningen Allmogekon.

In 2014 the total Väneko population was reported to be 190.

== Characteristics ==
The coat of the Väneko is multi-coloured, black or red, sometimes with white; the cattle may be solid-coloured, red or black pied, or colour-sided. Bulls weigh approximately 775 kg, cows about 525 kg.

== Use ==
The Väneko is a dairy breed, kept principally for its milk; it is, however, not very productive. The only breeding aim is preservation of the breed without contamination from other breeds. It is maintained for social and cultural reasons, and may be used in vegetation management.
