= Pustertaler Sprinzen =

Breed of cattle

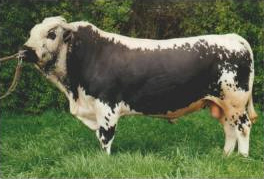
- A Pustertaler bull
- Other names: Pustertaler Schecken; Pustertaler; Barà
- Country of origin: Italy: provinces of Bolzano, Turin
- Use: Dual-purpose: milk and beef

Traits
- Weight: Male: 900 kg; Female: 650 kg
- Coat: Multi-coloured: white, with red or black pied markings on the flanks
- Horn status: Horned

The Pustertaler Sprinzen, also called Pustertaler or Pustertaler Schecken, is a rare breed of cattle from the Puster Valley in the autonomous province of Bolzano, now in north-eastern Italy. Genetic research carried out in 2001 showed the Barà breed of the province of Turin to be closely similar to the Pustertaler; the two populations have since 2002 been treated and registered as a single breed. It is one of the sixteen minor Italian cattle breeds of limited diffusion recognised and protected by the Ministero delle Politiche Agricole Alimentari e Forestali, the Italian ministry of agriculture.

== History ==
Pustertaler cattle originate from an area that includes the Pustertal and its tributary valleys, and the eastern parts of the Eisacktal or Isarco valley. Following the construction of the Pustertal railway in the 1860s, hundreds of head were bought and loaded at Bruneck for transport north of the Alps, particularly to the area of Vienna, where the Pustertaler came to be known as the Wiener Kuh, or Viennese cow. The Pustertaler was highly esteemed for its milk, and commanded high prices. A herd-book was opened in 1900, and several breeder associations formed in the next few years. However, some Pustertal farmers replaced the animals they had sold with cheaper stock from Carinthia, which led to a decline in quality. The First World War and the cession of South Tyrol to Italy under the Treaty of Saint-Germain of 1919 led to a decline in numbers also, and the herd-book was not maintained after 1920. After the ending of inspection for bull licensing through a Decree of the Agrarian Inspectorate in 1927 the cattle breed collapsed. An attempt to revive the fortunes of the breed was made between 1954 and 1967; approximately 300 cows and 500 calves were registered during this period. Italian regional cattle breeds of limited diffusion, including the Pustertaler, came under ministerial protection in 1985. Responsibility for registration of these breeds was delegated to the Associazione Italiana Allevatori, the national breeders' association, in 1991. Between 1983 and 2002 breed numbers remained low; numbers in 2002 were variously estimated at 635 head (with less than 100 cows registered); and at about 200.

A genetic study carried out in 2001 showed that the local breed known in the provinces of Turin and Cuneo as the Barà (dialect for barrato, "barred") was closely similar to the Pustertaler. The two populations have since 2002 been treated and registered as a single breed. The Barà race numbered several thousand, so overall breed numbers increased substantially. A total population of 3321 head was reported in 2009.

== Characteristics ==
The cattle are finched and colour-sided: they are basically white with chestnut-brown to light brown or black plaques on the flanks that dissolve into small spots at the margins. They have short spreading or forward pointing horns. The cows weigh 500–650 kg and average 130 cm tall at the withers, the bulls 800–900 kg and about 140 cm tall.

The breed is reared in Austria, Germany, Italy and South Africa.
