= Allmogekor =

Breed of cattle

Allmogekor (singular Allmogeko, [ˈâlːmuːɡɛˌkuː]) are the traditional Swedish breeds of cattle. The word means roughly "rustic cattle".

== Individual breeds ==
There are a number of Allmogeko breeds. The herdbook for three of them – the Bohuskulla, the Ringamålako and the Väneko – is kept by the Föreningen Allmogekon, which works to conserve these three.

The herd book for the Fjällnära Boskap is kept by the Föreningen för Äldre Svensk Boskap, and that for the Rödkulla by the Sveriges Rödkulleförening.

On its Red List, the Swedish Samarbetsgruppen Lantrasforum (Cooperative Group Landrace Forum) ranks all five of these Allmogeko breeds in the highest risk level, "acutely threatened".

== Usage ==
These cattle were used as dual- to triple-purpose breeds, i. e. as breeds which served as draft animals, dairy cattle and beef suppliers. No longer able to compete with modern single-purpose breeds in terms of profit maximization, they are preserved as a cultural heritage, as living gene banks, and as extensive care cattle suited both for young Swedish back-to-the-country families and for conservation projects. The Väneko has been used for conservation grazing in the Hornborgasjön nature reserve, contributing to the conservation of both the reserve and the endangered breed.

== See also ==
- Telemark cattle
