= Finching =

Finching may refer to

- Finching (cattle), a colour pattern of cattle
- Finching, English translation of vinkensport, a sport in which male Chaffinches sing competitively
