= Ringamålako =

Breed of cattle

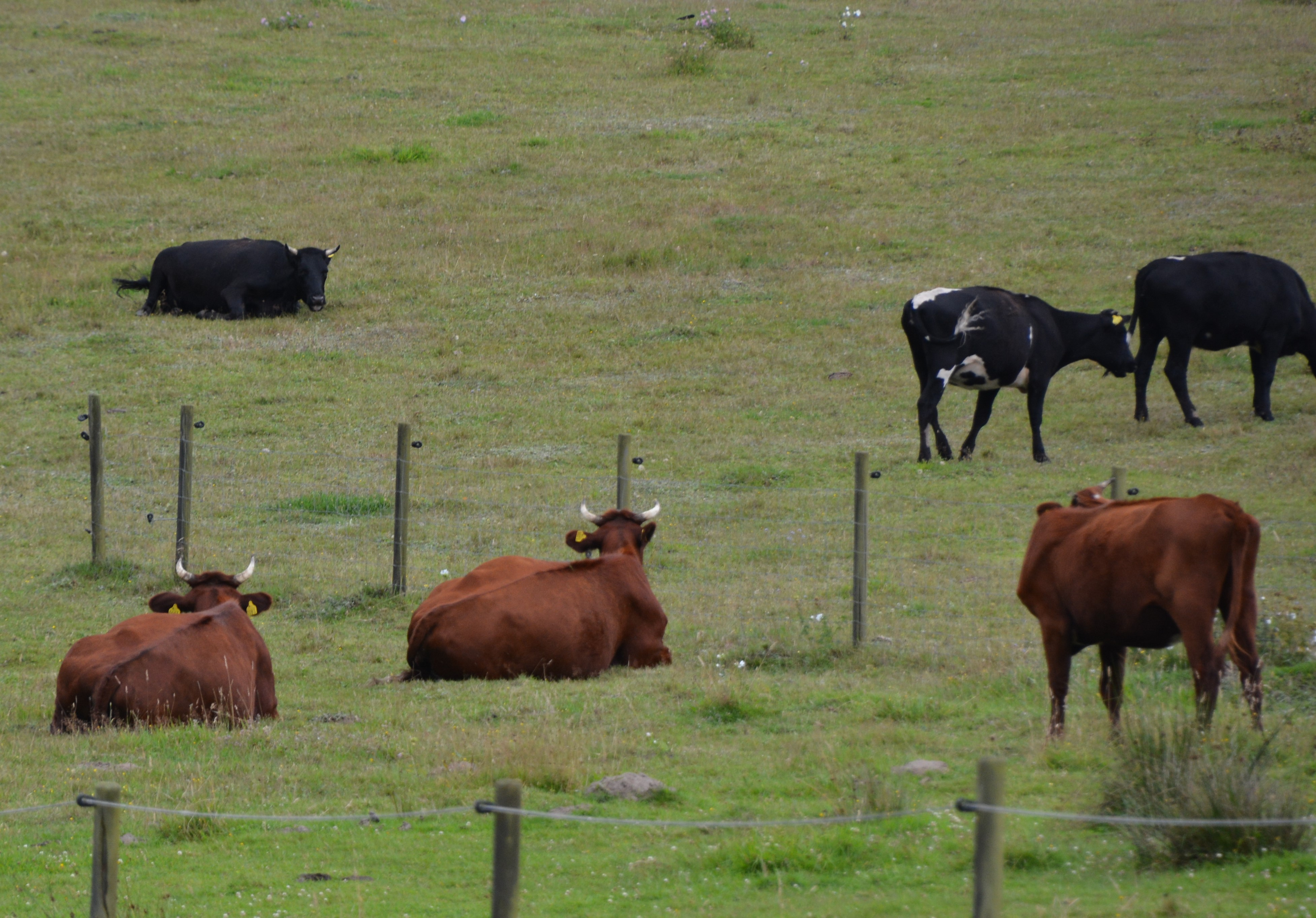
- Rögnarrödsko (foreground) and Granemålako (background), two strains or sub-types within the Ringamålako breed, at the Kulturens Östarp open air museum and cultural reserve in Skåne
- Conservation status: FAO (2007): critical-maintained
- Country of origin: Sweden
- Use: milk

Traits
- Weight: Male: 750 kg; Female: 500 kg
- Coat: red and white
- Horn status: horned in both sexes
- Cattle; Bos (primigenius) taurus

The Ringamålako is an endangered Swedish breed of dairy cattle. It is named for the village of Ringamåla in the southern Swedish county of Blekinge, and is found primarily in southern Sweden. It is similar to the type of Swedish Red-and-White cattle of the 1940s, and is considered a valuable genetic resource.

== History ==
The Ringamålako is a traditional domestic Swedish breed. It is named for the småort of Ringamåla in the southern Swedish county of Blekinge, where a farming couple had maintained a closed herd of the animals for more than forty years. It is thought to be similar to the type of Swedish Red-and-White (Swedish: Svensk Röd och Vit Boskap or SRB) cattle that was raised in the 1940s. Like the Swedish Red-and-White, it derives from the former Swedish Red Pied and Swedish Ayrshire breeds. The Ringamålako population was isolated from other dairy breeds for many years, and is considered to be a valuable genetic resource. There is a programme of recovery and conservation of the breed. The Ringamålako herd-book was established in 1993.

The Ringamålako is grouped with two other endangered indigenous cattle breeds, the Väneko and the Bohuskulla, as Allmogekor, or roughly "Swedish native cattle". Conservation and registration of these populations is managed by a society, the Föreningen Allmogekon.

Two lines or sub-types within the breed are conserved at the Kulturens Östarp open-air museum near Veberöd in Lund Municipality, in Skåne County: the Rögnarrödsko is a red-coated type derived from a small herd found near Ljungbyhed in Klippan Municipality of Skåne in 2009, while the Granemålako, mostly black, descends from a group identified in Granemåla, in Karlskrona Kommun of Blekinge, in 2004.

In 2014 the total Ringamålako population was reported to be 164.

== Characteristics ==
The coat of the Ringamålako is multi-coloured red and white. Bulls weigh approximately 750 kg, cows about 500 kg.

== Use ==
The Ringamålako is a dual-purpose breed, kept both for its milk and for its meat; it is, however, not very productive. The only breeding aim is preservation of the breed without contamination from other breeds. It is maintained as a genetic resource for the Swedish Red-and-White, and for social and cultural reasons. It may be used in vegetation management.

A small number are kept, together with sheep of the endangered Roslag breed, at pasture at the Bokö Nature Reserve in the Östergötland archipelago.
