= Ljungstorp och Jägersbo =

- Location within Skåne Location within Sweden
- Coordinates: 55°55′N 13°34′E
- Country: Sweden
- Province: Skåne
- County: Skåne County
- Municipality: Höör Municipality

Area
  - Total: 0.61 km^{2} (0.24 sq mi)

Population (31 December 2010)
  - Total: 401
  - Density: 658/km^{2} (1,700/sq mi)
- Time zone: UTC+1 (CET)
  - Summer (DST): UTC+2 (CEST)

Ljungstorp och Jägersbo was a locality situated in Höör Municipality, Skåne County, Sweden with 401 inhabitants in 2010. It merged with the locality of Höör in 2015.
