= Emil Kléen =

Swedish journalist and poet (1868–1898)

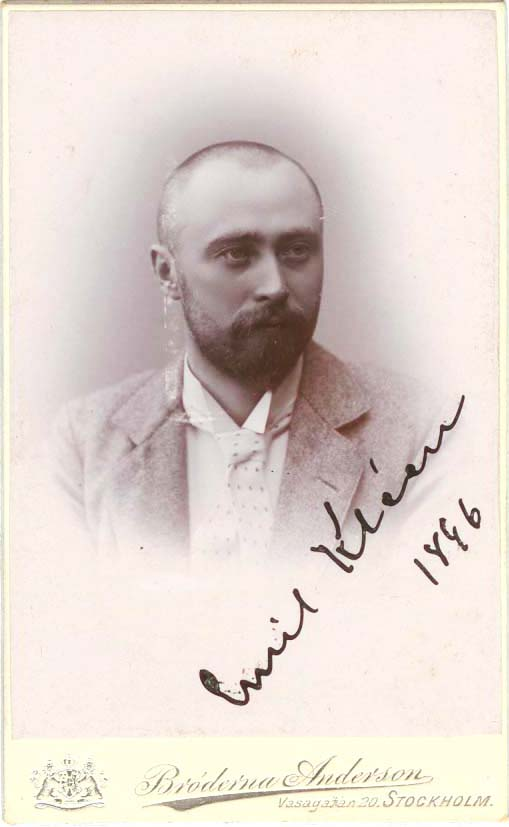
Emil Kléen in 1896

Johan Emil Kléen (17 September 1868 in Sätofta, Skåne – 10 December 1898 in Lund) was a Swedish journalist and poet. He was an admirer and protégé of August Strindberg.

== See also ==
- Sedlighetsdebatten
