= RSB =

RSB may refer to:

- Rajapur Saraswat Brahmins, an Indian Brahmin community
- Rashid School For Boys, Dubai
- Rebecca Sean Borgstrom, former name of role-playing game author Jenna Moran
- Revolutionary Socialist League (Germany) (Revolutionär Sozialistischer Bund, RSB)
- Red Star Belgrade, Serbian football club (official name "Fudbalski klub Crvena zvezda")
- Rigi-Scheidegg-Bahn, a former mountain railway in Switzerland
- Riverside School Board, Quebec, Canada
- The reporting mark for the Rochester Subway
- Roundtable on Sustainable Biofuels
- Royal Society for the Blind, a not-for-profit organisation servicing blind and visually impaired people in South Australia
- Royal Society of Biology, a learned society and professional association in the United Kingdom
- The former Swedish Red Pied or Rödbrokig Svensk Boskap breed of cattle
