= Skåne Zoo =

Zoo in Sweden

Skånes Djurpark
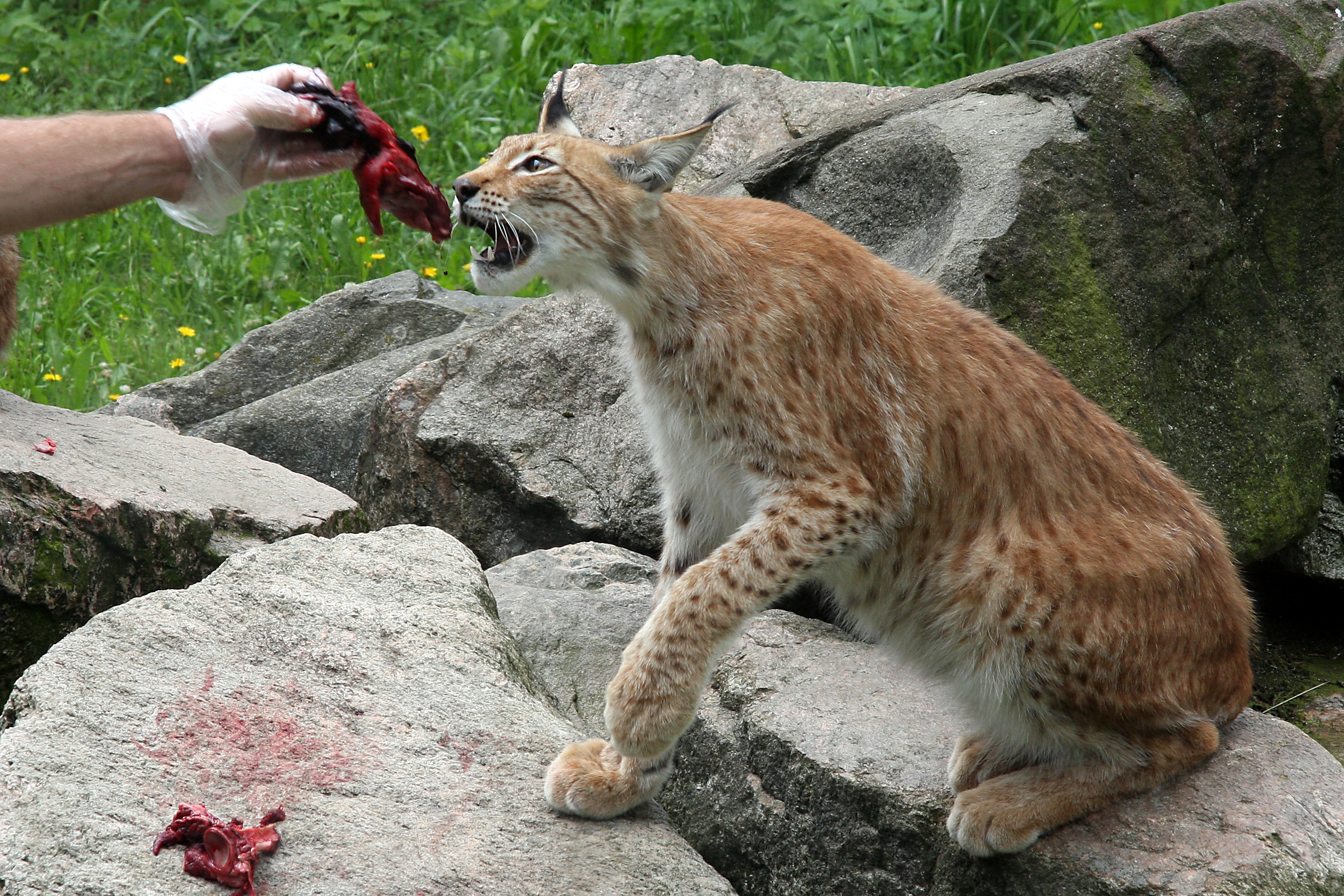
- Feeding of the lynx
- Interactive map of Skånes Djurpark
- 55.9630984°N 13.5366583°E
- Date opened: 1953
- Location: Höör Municipality, Skåne County, Sweden
- No. of animals: ~900
- No. of species: ~100
- Annual visitors: 211,000 (2008)
- Memberships: EAZA
- Website: www.skanesdjurpark.se

Skåne Zoo (Swedish: Skånes Djurpark) is a Swedish zoological park located in Höör Municipality, Skåne County. It specializes in animals of the Nordic fauna, although orphaned animals from elsewhere in the world are sometimes temporarily housed there until a new home can be found for them. The zoo has about 900 animals, representing almost 100 species. These animals are most often kept in large enclosures with natural environments. Some of the domestic animals displayed include: Skånegås (Scania goose, a type of domestic goose), Gute sheep, Fjäll cattle, and Jämtlandsget (Jämtland goat, a type of domestic goat).

== History ==
Founded in 1953, Skånes Djurpark is operated as a foundation. It is a member of the European Association of Zoos and Aquaria. Camilla Jönsson has been chief of the zoo since 2008. The Skånes Djurpark foundation is supported by the Skåne Regional Council (Swedish: Region Skåne), which provides the zoo with one to two million kronor each year. The entrance cost at Skånes Djurpark is 200 kronor for an adult. The previous price of 160 kronor was increased in 2009 so that the zoo's budget could be met. The number of visitors at Skånes Djurpark has increased in the past few years. There were a total 211,000 visitors at the zoo in 2008, and slightly more in 2009.

== Incidents ==
Skånes Djurpark became the subject of controversy in early 2010, when an entire pack of wolves escaped from their enclosure and were shot to death. These wolves were shot to prevent escape from the zoo, which led to criticism from animal rights activists. The security of the zoo's enclosures was also criticized, and a complaint was filed by Djurrättsalliansen (English: Animal Rights Alliance) against Skånes Djurpark.
