= Ormanäs och Stanstorp =

- Location within Skåne Location within Sweden
- Coordinates: 55°54′N 13°30′E
- Country: Sweden
- Province: Skåne
- County: Skåne County
- Municipality: Höör Municipality

Area
  - Total: 1.44 km^{2} (0.56 sq mi)

Population (31 December 2010)
  - Total: 438
  - Density: 304/km^{2} (790/sq mi)
- Time zone: UTC+1 (CET)
  - Summer (DST): UTC+2 (CEST)

Ormanäs och Stanstorp is a locality situated in Höör Municipality, Skåne County, Sweden with 438 inhabitants in 2010.
