= Löberöd =

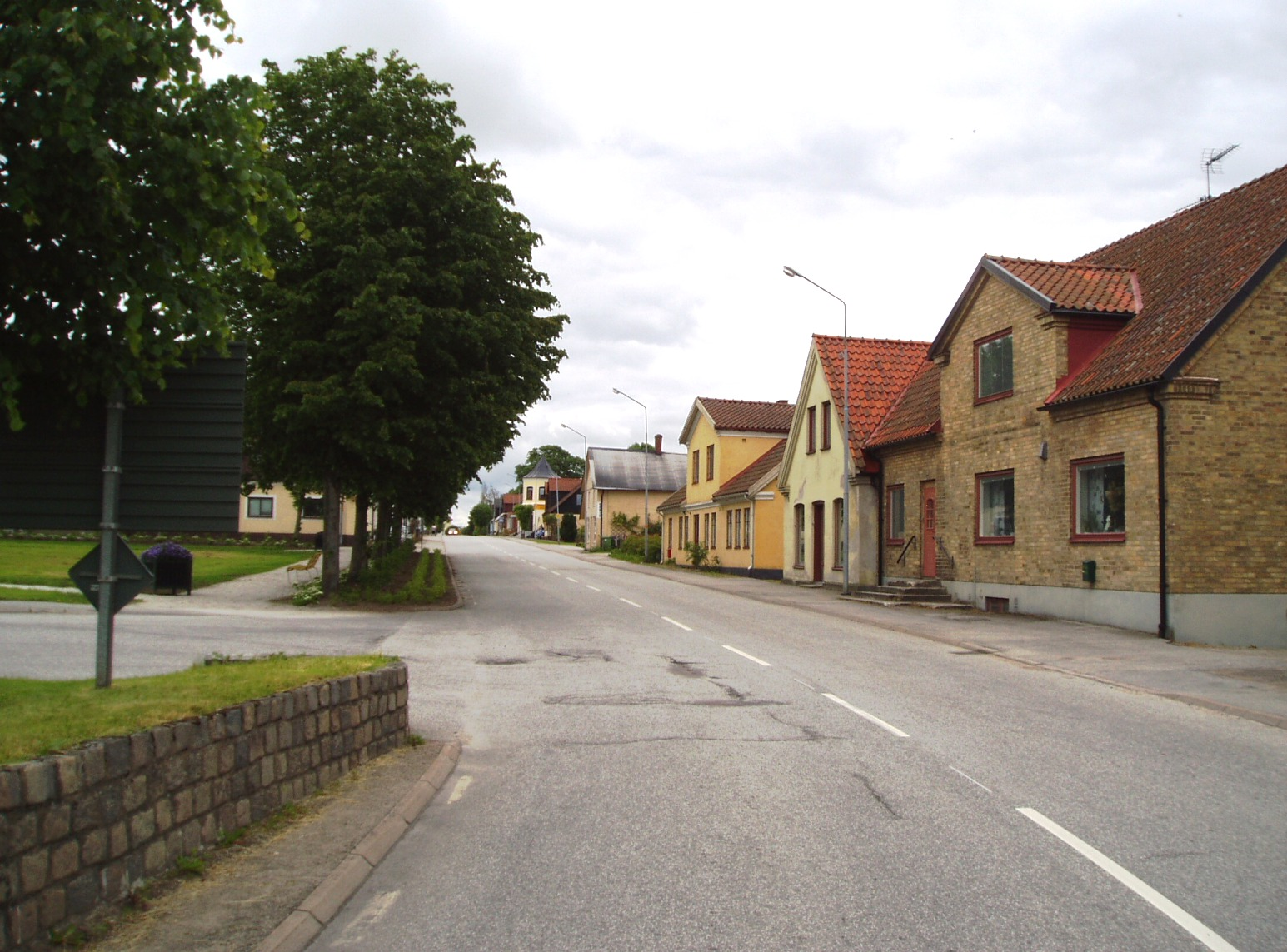
- Street in Löberöd

- Location within Skåne Location within Sweden
- Coordinates: 55°47′N 13°30′E
- Country: Sweden
- Province: Skåne
- County: Skåne County
- Municipality: Eslöv Municipality and Höör Municipality

Area
  - Total: 0.77 km^{2} (0.30 sq mi)

Population (31 December 2010)
  - Total: 1,127
  - Density: 1,460/km^{2} (3,800/sq mi)
- Time zone: UTC+1 (CET)
  - Summer (DST): UTC+2 (CEST)

Löberöd is a bimunicipal locality situated in Eslöv Municipality and Höör Municipality in Skåne County, Sweden with 1,127 inhabitants in 2010.
