= Norra Rörum =

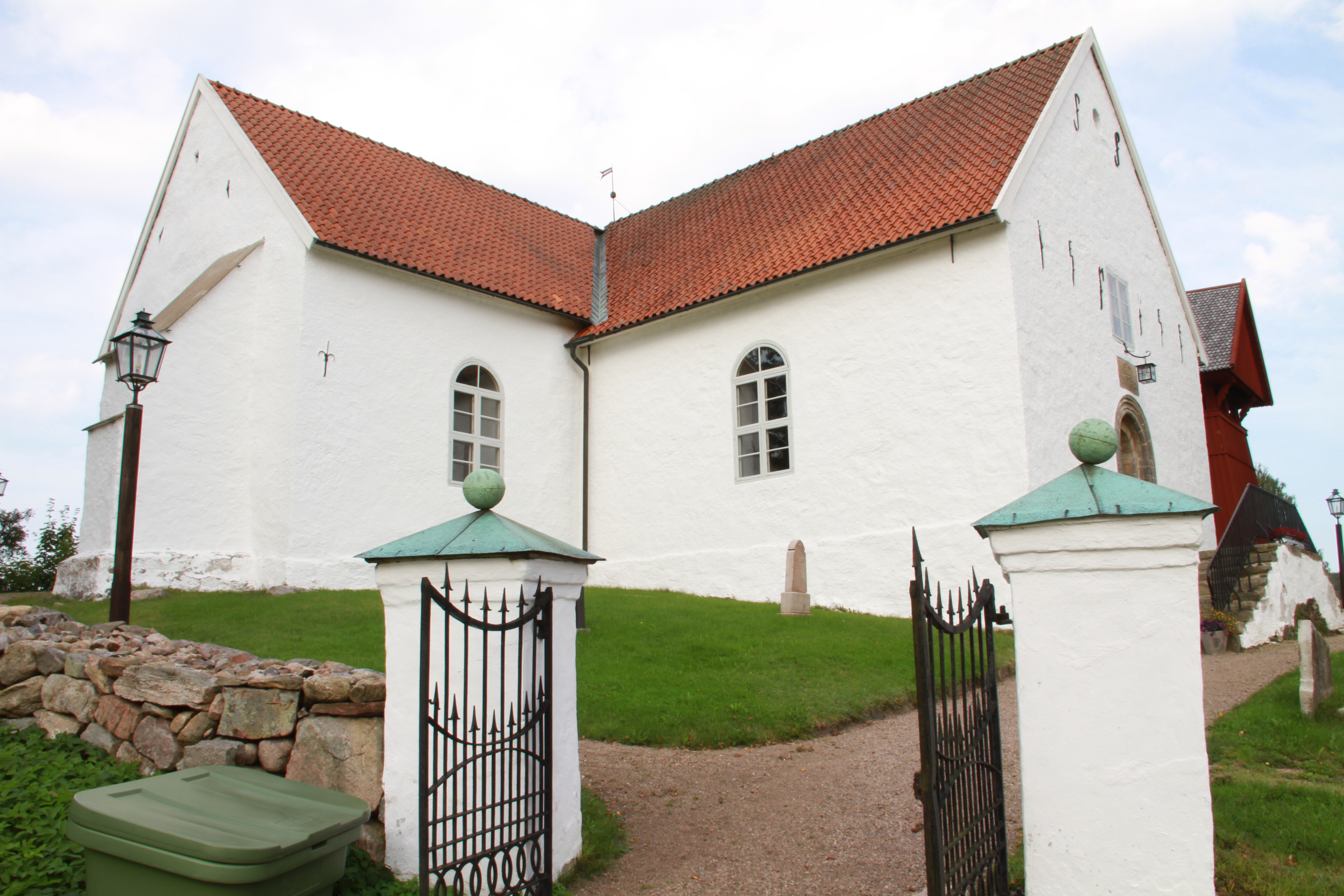
- Norra Rörum Church

- Location within Skåne Location within Sweden
- Coordinates: 56°01′N 13°30′E
- Country: Sweden
- Province: Skåne
- County: Skåne County
- Municipality: Höör Municipality

Area
  - Total: 0.34 km^{2} (0.13 sq mi)

Population (31 December 2010)
  - Total: 204
  - Density: 600/km^{2} (1,600/sq mi)
- Time zone: UTC+1 (CET)
  - Summer (DST): UTC+2 (CEST)

Norra Rörum is a locality situated in Höör Municipality, Skåne County, Sweden with 204 inhabitants in 2010.
