= Speckle Park =

Canadian breed of cattle

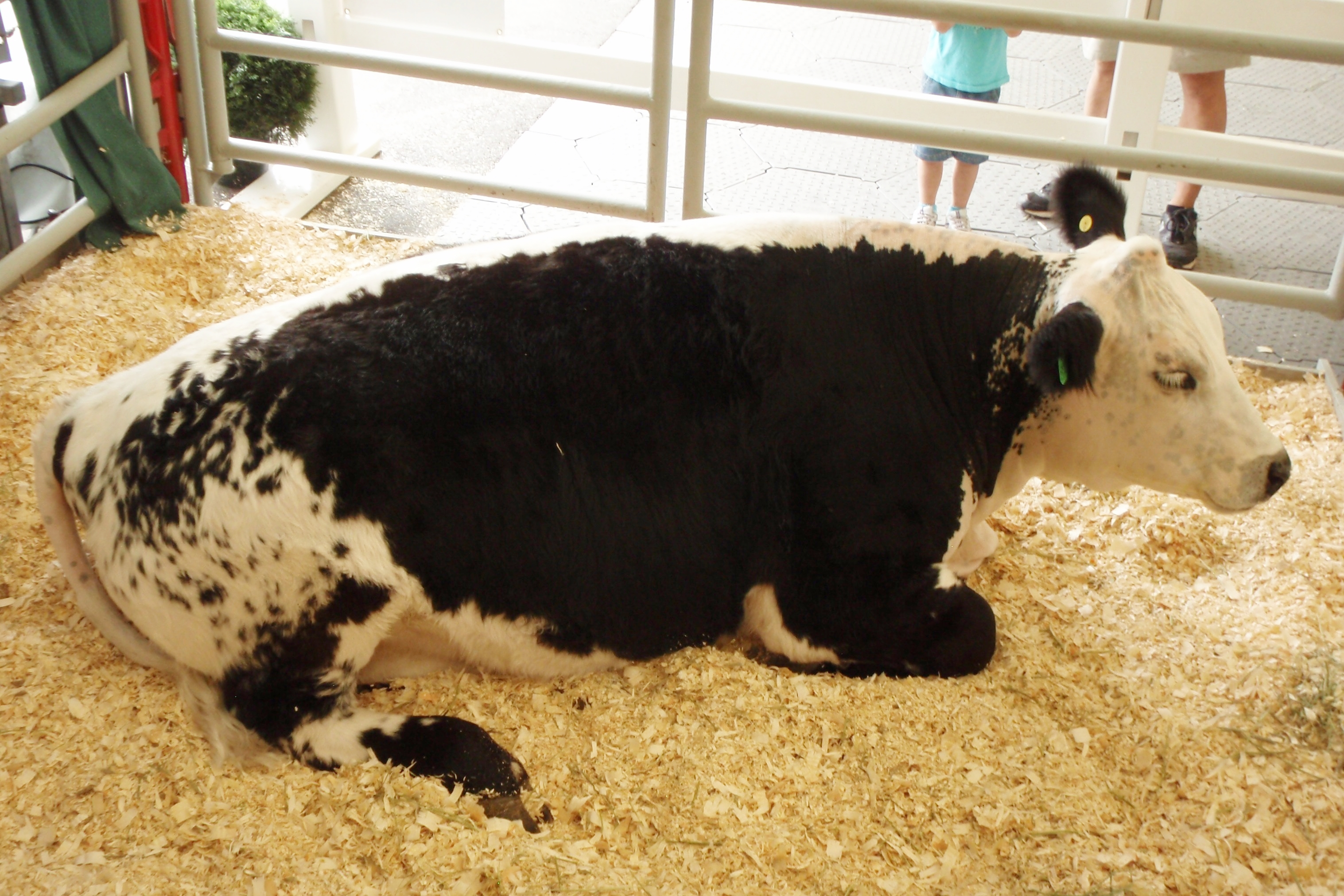
- At Stampede Park, Calgary, Alberta
- Conservation status: DAD-IS (2021): at risk/endangered
- Country of origin: Canada
- Distribution: Australia; Ireland; United Kingdom

Traits
- Coat: colour-sided; colour-pointed; solid black
- Horn status: polled
- Cattle; Bos (primigenius) taurus

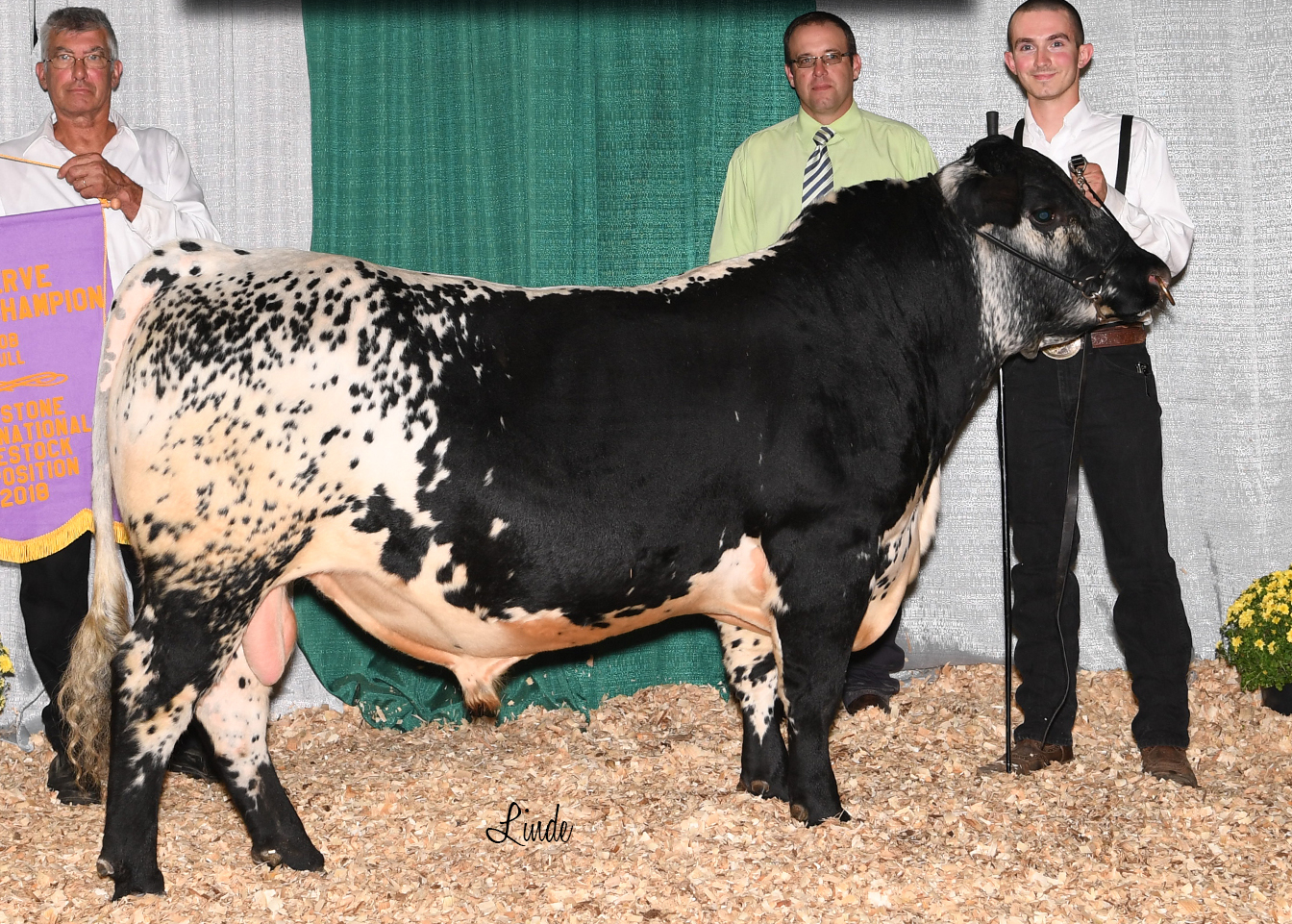
Bull at the Farm Show Complex in Harrisburg, Pennsylvania

The Speckle Park is a modern Canadian breed of beef cattle. It was developed in the Canadian province of Saskatchewan from 1959, by cross-breeding stock of the Scottish Aberdeen Angus and Shorthorn breeds; the spotted or speckled pattern for which it is named derived from a single bull with the colour-pointed markings of the British White Park. It is one of only a few beef cattle breeds developed in Canada.

The Speckle Park was officially recognised as an 'evolving breed' in 1995, and received full 'distinct breed' recognition from the Canadian government in 2006. Some have been exported to Australia, to Ireland and to the United Kingdom.

Numbers are low, and in Canada it is an endangered breed.

== History ==
The Speckle Park was developed in the Canadian province of Saskatchewan from 1959, by cross-breeding stock of the Scottish Aberdeen Angus and Shorthorn breeds; the spotted or speckled pattern for which it is named derived from a single bull with the colour-pointed markings of the British White Park.

A breed association, the Canadian Speckle Park Association, was formed in 1985. In 1995 the byelaws of the association received ministerial approval and the Speckle Park was officially recognised as an 'evolving breed'. It received full 'distinct breed' recognition from the Canadian government in 2006.

Some have been exported to Australia, to Ireland and to the United Kingdom.

In 2020 the Canadian population of the cattle was reported to DAD-IS at just over 1400 head; in 2021 the conservation status of the breed was reported as "at risk/endangered".

== Characteristics ==
Canadian Speckle Park is so named because of the colour pattern of the cattle. They are most often colour-sided, black with white spine and underbelly, with speckling to the hips and shoulders. They may also be colour-pointed, white with black points (i.e., black nose, ears and feet); or, less commonly, solid black.
