= Bohuskulla =

Swedish breed of cattle

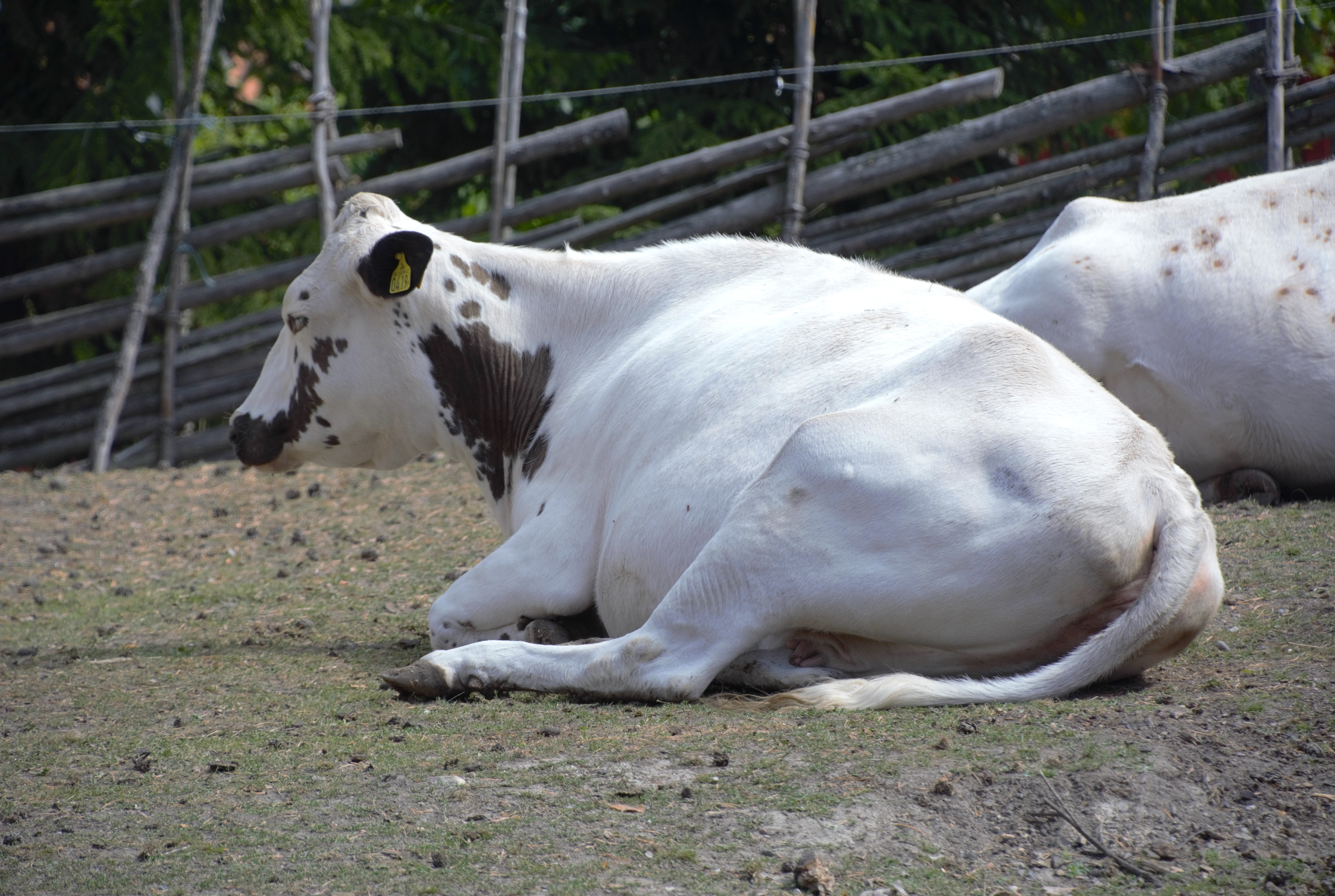
- Conservation status: FAO (2007): critical-maintained
- Country of origin: Sweden
- Distribution: Bohuslän; Dalsland; Västergötland

Traits
- Weight: Male: 600 kg; Female: 425 kg
- Coat: usually black or brown colour-sided
- Horn status: polled (hornless)
- Cattle; Bos (primigenius) taurus

The Bohuskulla is an endangered Swedish breed of hornless mountain cattle. It originates from the area of the Kynnefjäll plateau in northern Bohuslän and Dalsland, in western Sweden. It is a traditional domestic Swedish breed, and derives from a group of cattle discovered in the 1990s in Skepplanda, in Västergötland, close to the border with Bohuslän. Microsatellite analysis has shown it to be closely related to the Fjällko mountain cattle of Sweden.

== History ==
The Bohuskulla is a traditional domestic Swedish breed. Microsatellite analysis has shown it to be closely related to the Fjällko mountain cattle of Sweden. It originates from the barren pasture land of the Kynnefjäll plateau in northern Bohuslän and Dalsland, in western Sweden. Many were exported to Norway in the late nineteenth and early twentieth centuries.

In the 1990s a small population was identified in Skepplanda, in Västergötland, close to the border with Bohuslän; the cattle had been brought from the Kynnefjäll. A herd-book for the breed was established in 1993.

There is a programme of recovery and conservation of the breed. The Bohuskulla is grouped with two other endangered indigenous cattle breeds, the Ringamålako and the Väneko, as Allmogekor, or roughly "Swedish native cattle". Conservation and registration of these populations is managed by a society, the Föreningen Allmogekon.

In the past, some cross-breeding with the Fjällnära boskap breed of mountain cattle was allowed. Under a new breeding plan drawn up in 2007, this is no longer permitted.

In 2011 the total Bohuskulla population was reported to be 39 cows and 11 bulls, with semen from a further 7 bulls available for artificial insemination. In 2008 the Bohuskulla was reported to DAD-IS with 36 registered cows. In 2016 it was no longer among the breeds reported by the Swedish Board of Agriculture.

== Characteristics ==
The Bohuskulla has the typical qualities of mountain cattle: it is agile, fertile, and calves easily. The coat is variable; it is often colour-sided, either black or brown. Like the Fjällko, it is naturally polled (without horns). Bulls weigh approximately 600 kg, cows about 425 kg.

== Use ==
Like the other Allmogeko breeds, the Bohuskulla is not very productive.
