= Höör Municipality =

Höör Municipality Höörs kommun
- Municipality
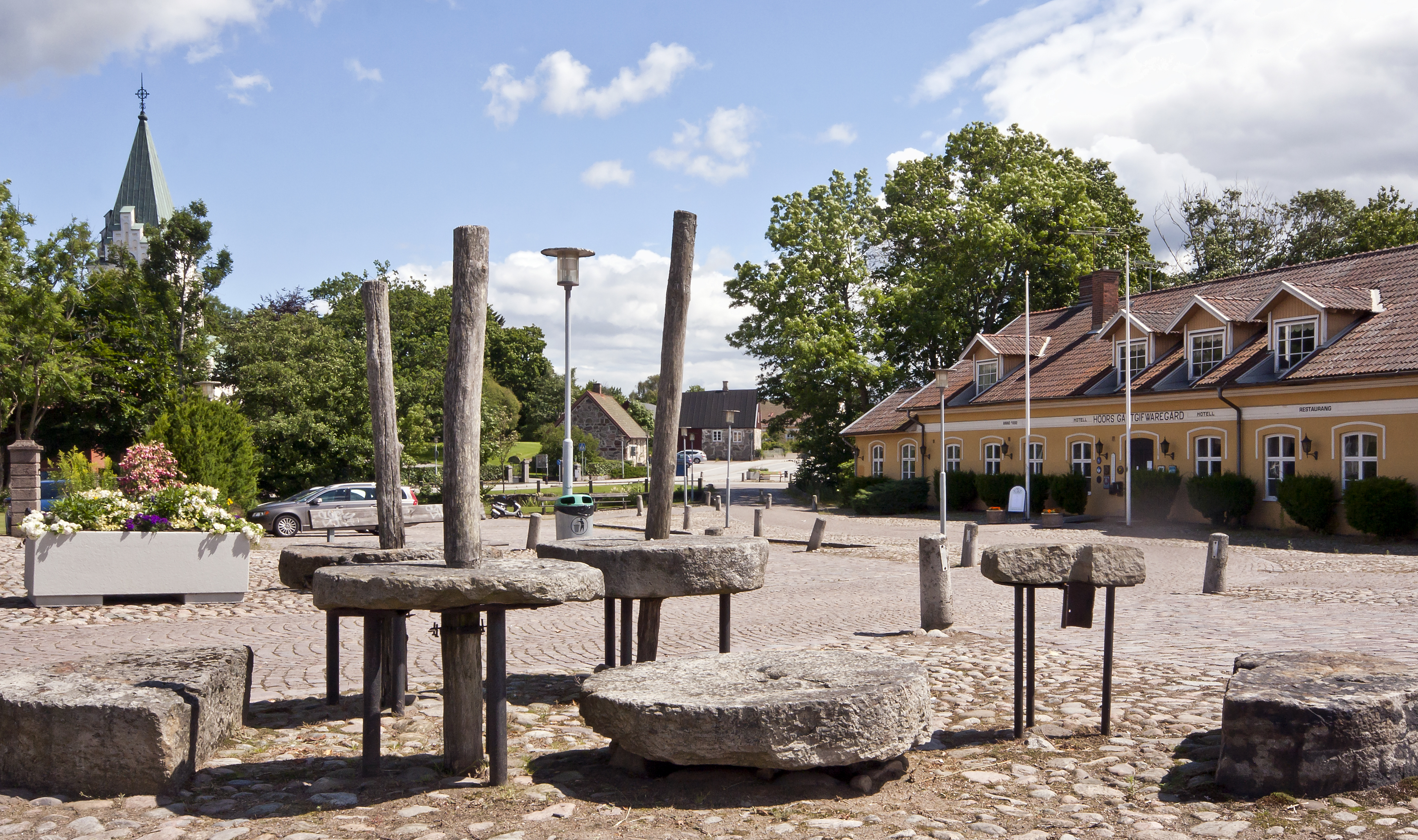

- Coat of arms

- Coordinates: 55°56′N 13°33′E
- Country: Sweden
- County: Skåne County
- Seat: Höör

Area
  - Total: 320 km^{2} (120 sq mi)
  - Land: 290.85 km^{2} (112.30 sq mi)
  - Water: 29.15 km^{2} (11.25 sq mi)
- Area as of 1 January 2014.

Population (30 June 2025)
  - Total: 17,587
  - Density: 60.468/km^{2} (156.61/sq mi)
- Time zone: UTC+1 (CET)
  - Summer (DST): UTC+2 (CEST)
- ISO 3166 code: SE
- Province: Scania
- Municipal code: 1267
- Website: www.hoor.se

Höör Municipality (Swedish: Höörs kommun) is a municipality in the central part of Skåne County in southern Sweden. Its seat is located in the town of Höör.

The present municipality was formed in 1969 through the merger of "old" Höör with the municipalities of Norra Frosta, Snogeröd and Tjörnarp parish from the dissolved Sösdala Municipality.

== Geography ==
Höör Municipality credits itself by being different from the rest of Scania: Apart from agricultural areas, Höör Municipality also has several forests and the lake Ringsjön. Ringsjön is the second largest lake in Skåne County and covers some 40 km^{2}, about three times the size of the town of Höör.

The two main attractions of the municipality that draw visitors are the zoological garden Skånes Djurpark, and the Bosjökloster Castle established in the 12th century. The castle is situated in a scenic location in a cape in the lake Ringsjön; the zoological garden is situated just north of the town of Höör.

Sights in the town proper are few in the little town with its 7,000 inhabitants, but it has a large 12th-century church, with a north transept from 1769 (an unusual date for Skåne churches) and a 19th-century tower, along with some picturesque older houses. A peaceful place, the typical Höör house is one or two storeys tall, with no large streets. Adding to the picturesque image are two centrally located small ponds with densely foliaged trees and bushes surrounding them, which increases in thickness until they unite with the forests surrounding the town.

=== Localities ===
There are six localities in the municipality. Population as of December 31, 2005.

#	Locality	Population
1	Höör	7 379
2	Sätofta	1 160
3	Tjörnarp	742
4	Ormanäs och Stanstorp	422
5	Ljungstorp och Jägersbo	384
6	Norra Rörum	203

A small part of Löberöd is also within Höör Municipality.

== Demographics ==
This is a demographic table based on Höör Municipality's electoral districts in the 2022 Swedish general election sourced from SVT's election platform, in turn taken from SCB official statistics.

In total there were 16,929 residents, including 12,804 Swedish citizens of voting age. 39.8% voted for the left coalition and 58.5% for the right coalition. Indicators are in percentage points except population totals and income.

Location	Residents	Citizen adults	Left vote	Right vote	Employed	Swedish parents	Foreign heritage	Income SEK	Degree
Location			%	%					
Bokeslund	1,749	1,320	38.9	59.2	83	88	12	27,040	46
Centrum	1,426	1,149	42.1	56.5	75	79	21	19,909	33
Frostavallen	1,802	1,397	38.1	60.2	81	89	11	26,642	47
Maglasäte	1,521	1,305	42.8	56.2	84	87	13	26,431	55
Ormanäs	1,719	1,303	43.6	54.4	77	79	21	23,301	41
Orup	1,891	1,351	39.4	59.5	84	88	12	29,384	48
Snogeröd	1,677	1,215	28.6	69.3	84	85	15	28,291	42
Stanstorp	1,710	1,231	37.5	60.8	85	88	12	27,803	50
Tjörnarp	1,672	1,271	38.5	59.9	78	84	16	24,232	36
Veterinärsomr.	1,762	1,262	48.9	49.7	82	84	16	26,880	45
Source: SVT

== Parish churches ==
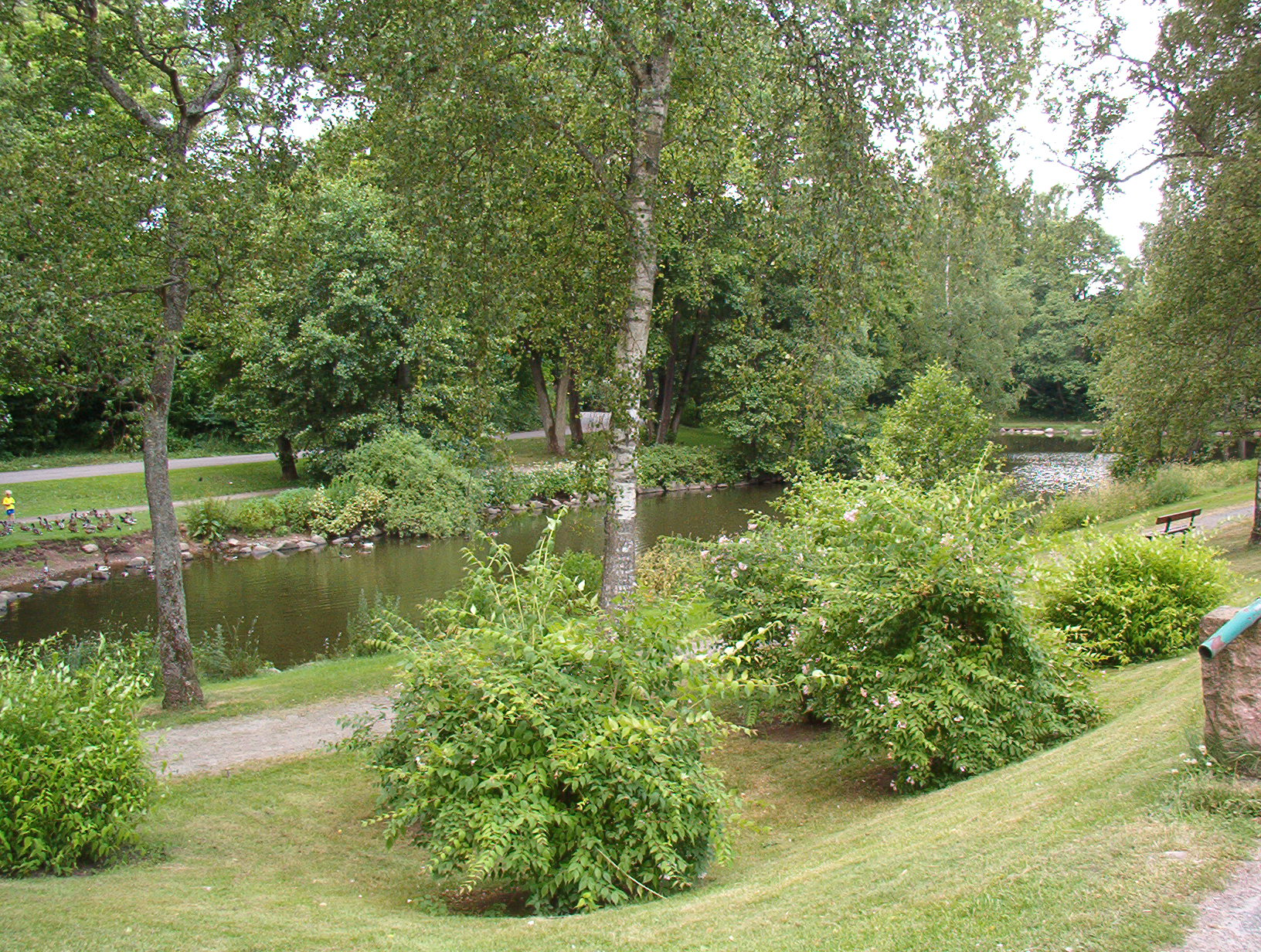
One of the ponds of the town

From January 1, 2006, Höör Municipality contains two parishes, Höör parish, incorporating the old parishes Hallaröd, Höör, Norra Rörum, and Munkarp, and parts of Ringsjö parish (the old parishes Bosjökloster and Gudmuntorp). Ringsjö parish also includes the old Hurva parish, which is in Eslöv Municipality. There are thus six former parish churches:

- Bosjökloster (12th century Romanesque, former abbey church, by Bosjökloster Castle)
- Gudmuntorp (1860, replacing 12th-century church)
- Hallaröd (late 12th century Romanesque, extended in the 19th century, late Gothic chalk paintings)
- Höör (late 12th century Romanesque, 19th-century tower, important Romanesque baptismal font)
- Norra Rörum (ca 1200, Romanesque, separate 18th century steeple, large burial chapel from the 1770s)
- Munkarp (1884, but contains baptismal font and pulpit from older church)

== International relations ==
=== Twin towns — Sister cities ===
The municipality is twinned with:

- Stevns Municipality in Denmark
- Soini in Finland
- Città di Castello in Italy
