= Randall Lineback =

American breed of cattle

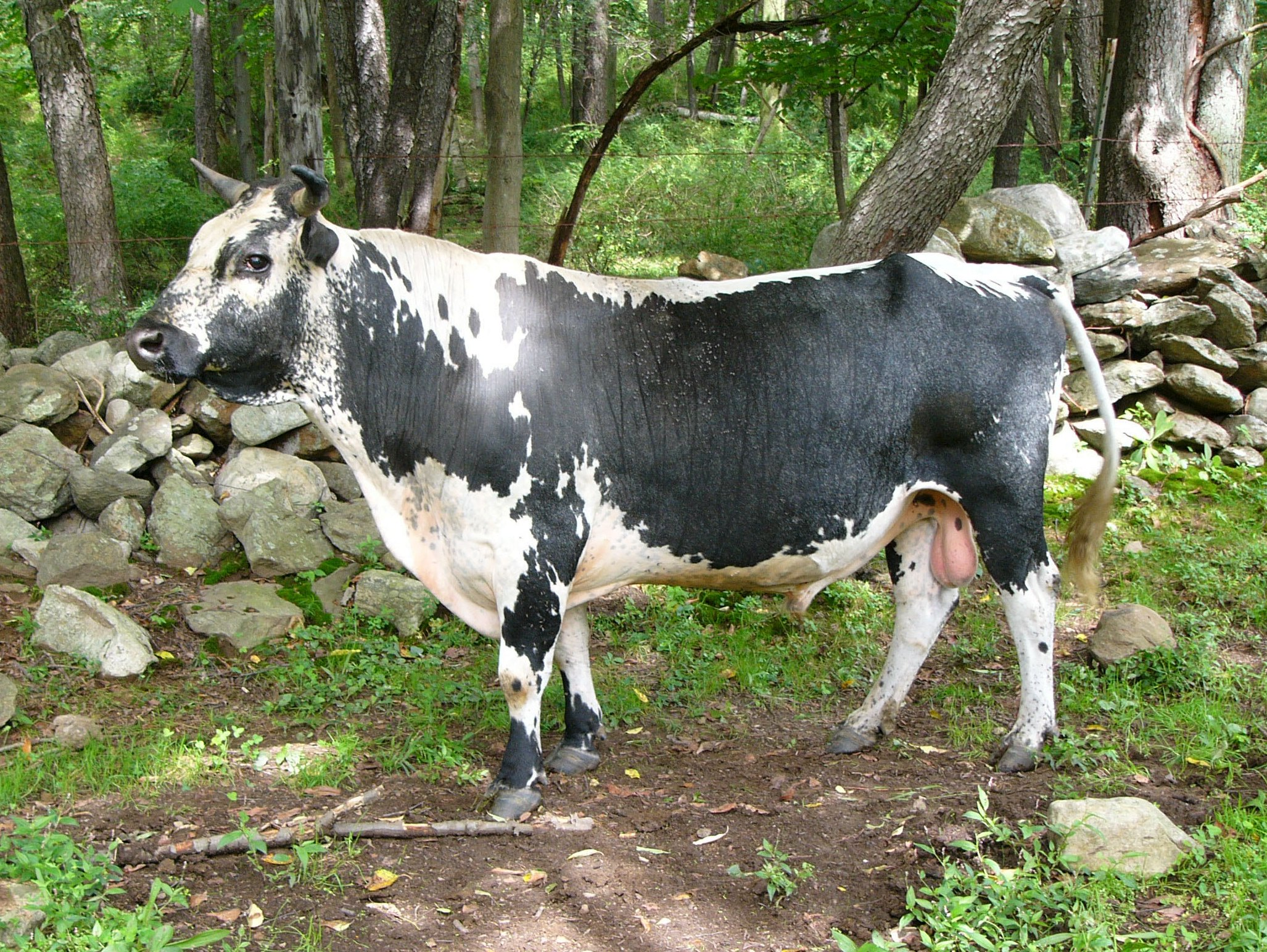
- A bull

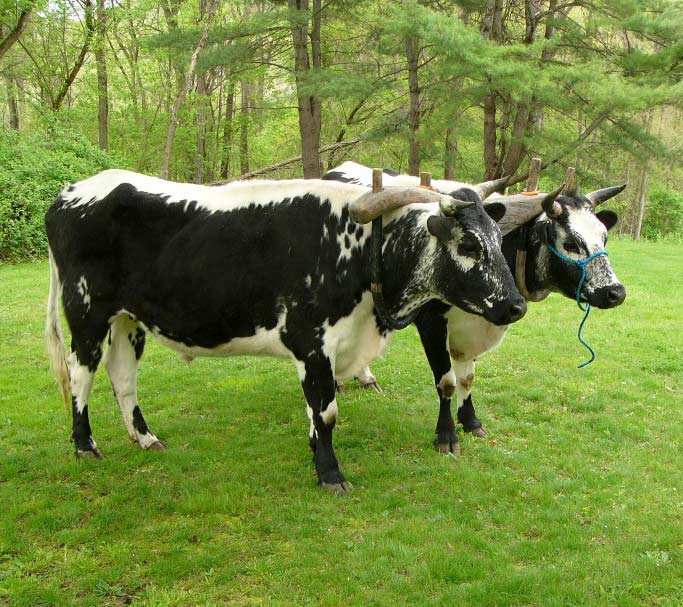
- Yoked pair of oxen
- Conservation status: FAO (2007): endangered; DAD-IS (2020): critical-maintained; The Livestock Conservancy (2020): critical
- Other names: Randall; Randall Blue Lineback; Randall Blue
- Country of origin: United States
- Distribution: Vermont

Traits
- Horn status: horned
- Cattle; Bos (primigenius) taurus

The Randall Lineback or Randall is an American breed of cattle. It originated in Bennington County, Vermont, and is critically endangered.

== History ==
The Randall derives from traditional linebacked or color-sided cattle once widespread in New England, in the north-eastern United States. These were triple-purpose cattle, reared for milk, for beef and for draft work, and are thought to have derived from cattle of British, Dutch and French origin.

From 1912, a herd of cattle of this type was kept largely isolated from outside breeding on the farm of the Randall family in either Arlington or Sunderland in Bennington County, Vermont. The family also kept some Guernsey stock, and there may have been some cross-breeding with these. After the family ceased dairy farming, the whole herd was kept at pasture for approximately fifteen years. In 1985, it was dispersed, and many animals were slaughtered; with the involvement of some members of the American Livestock Breeds Conservancy (now The Livestock Conservancy), six bulls and nine cows were bought for conservation reasons and taken to Tennessee. A breed society was formed in 2005. The Randall became a State Heritage Breed of the state of Vermont.

It is a rare breed. In 2015, the total number was over 500 head; in 2022 its conservation status was listed by the Livestock Conservancy as 'critical'.

== Characteristics ==
Randall cattle are quite variable in size and conformation and have a constitution that is suited to the New England climate. Randalls on average are medium in size with the cows weighing about 600-1100 lbs. and bulls weighing from 1000 to 1800 lbs. or more. Randall cattle have a "Colour-sided" lineback pattern, black markings on a white base, varying from almost white to very dark. Other subtle shades such as blue, mahogany, and gray have been observed, and there are now a number of recessive reds.

This breed is uniquely adapted to extensive or low input farming systems. Historically, the most suitable and natural environment for these cattle has been on small scale forage-based farms, subsistence farms, and homesteads. It is on such farms and homesteads that the unique genetic attributes of the Randalls can be fully expressed.

== Use ==
Randall Cattle are an all-purpose breed, meaning they originally served as dairy, meat, and draft animals.
