= Finching (cattle) =

Colour pattern of cattle

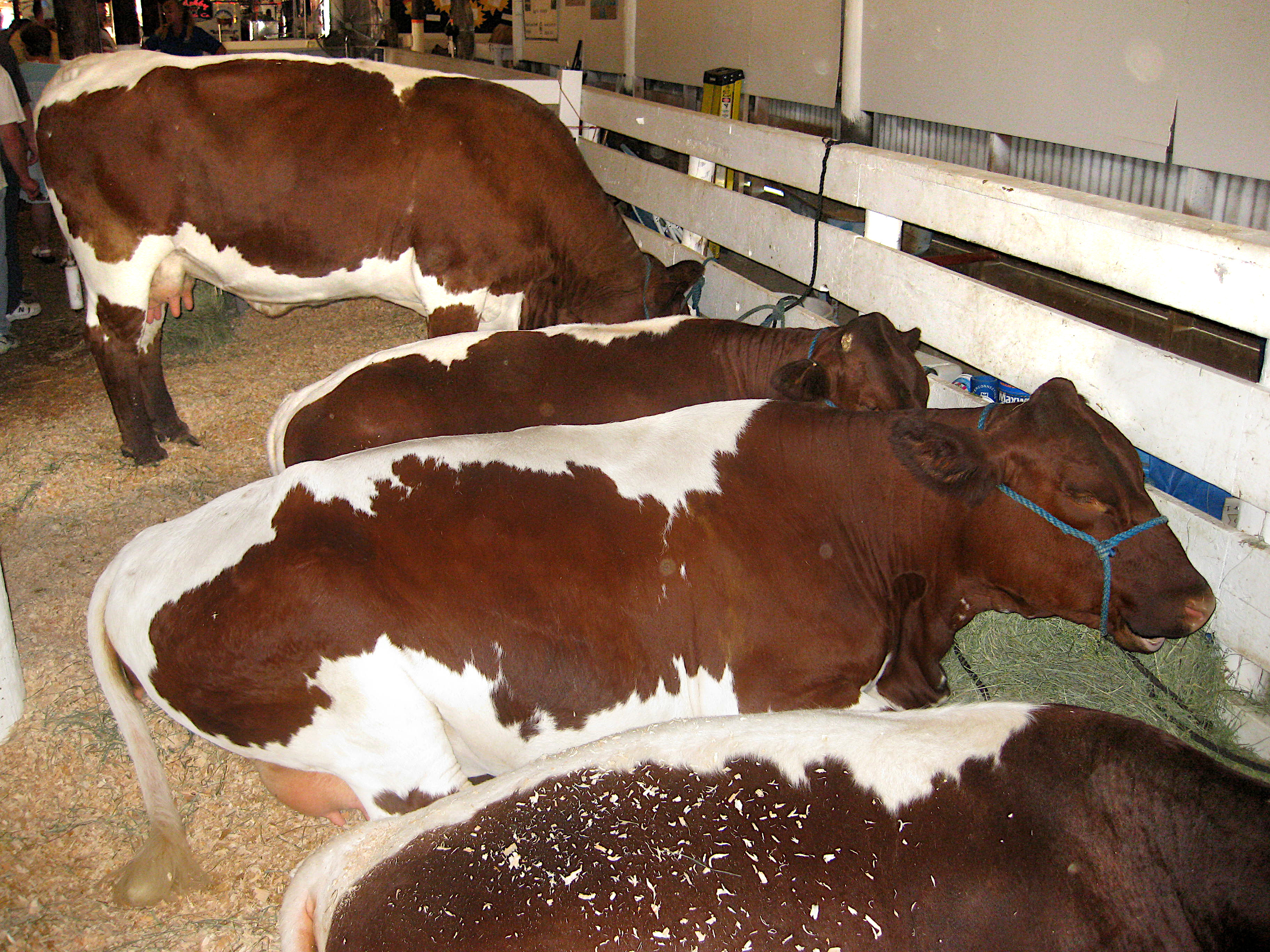
Finched Pinzgau cows

Finching is a colour pattern of cattle occurring in many unrelated breeds. It consists of a white or pale stripe along the spine. It may join to a white head, as in Hereford cattle, continue over the tail, as in Gloucester and Pinzgau cattle, or it may form part of another colour-sided pattern, for example in Randall Lineback, English Longhorn, Texas Longhorn, Speckle Park and Irish Moiled cattle. In some breeds, such as Jersey and Heck cattle, finching occurs mainly in bulls, forming a cream or white stripe along the spine of a black-brown animal.

Cattle with finching are said to be finched or finch-backed.
