= Swedish Polled =

Swedish breed of cattle

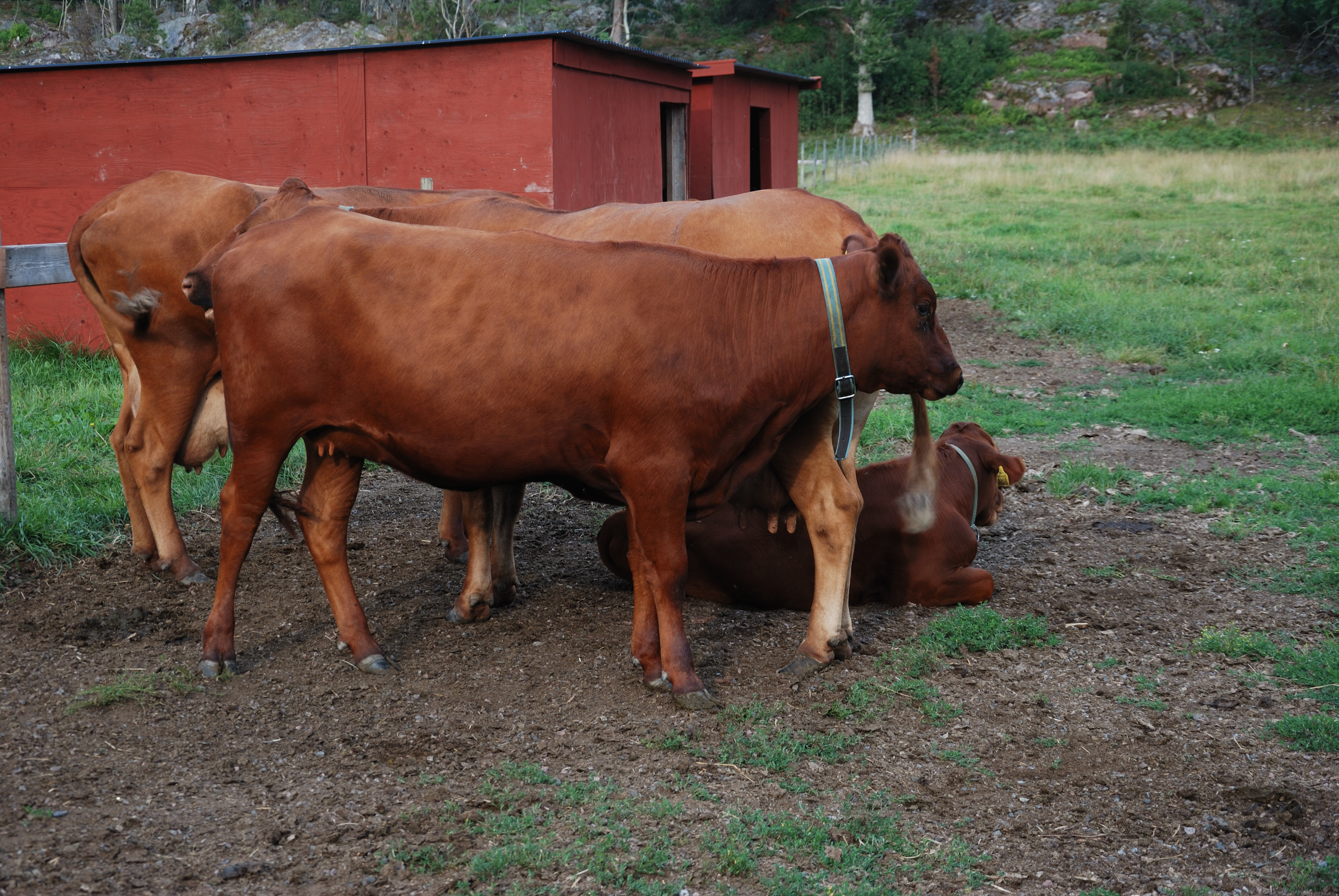
- Swedish Red Polled cow

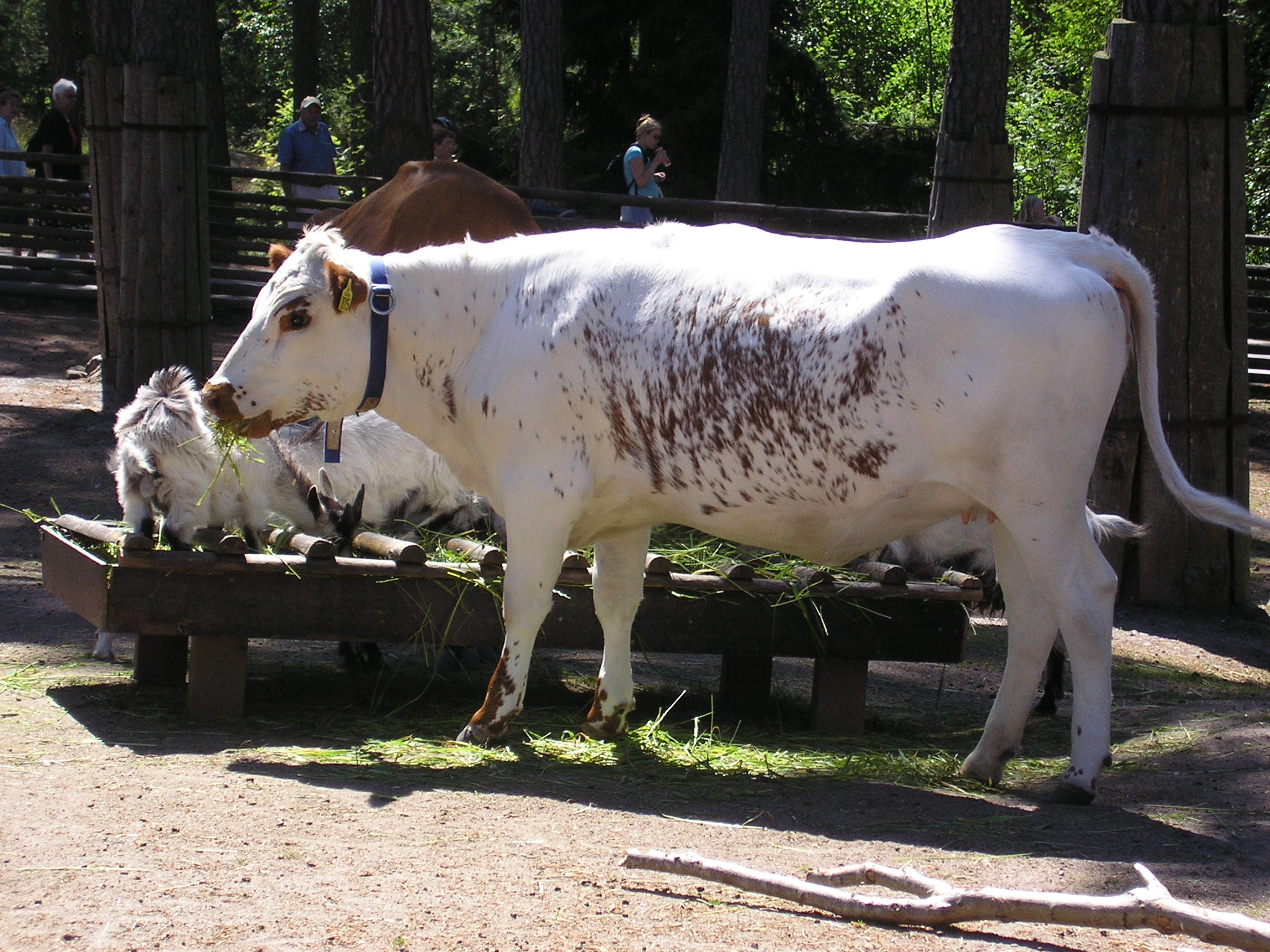
- Fjäll cow
- Conservation status: FAO (2007): not at risk
- Other names: Swedish: Svensk kullig boskap; SKB
- Country of origin: Sweden
- Use: milk

Traits
- Weight: Male: 650 kg; Female: 400 kg
- Height: Male: 130 cm; Female: 120 cm
- Coat: solid red; red-and-white
- Horn status: polled (hornless)
- Cattle; Bos (primigenius) taurus

The Swedish Polled, Swedish: Svensk Kullig Boskap, often abbreviated to SKB, is a Swedish breed of domestic cattle. It was created in 1937 from two different Swedish cattle breeds, the Swedish Red Polled and the Fjäll. Breeders did not accept the new classification, and continued to maintain separate bloodlines as before. Of the two constituent breeds, the Swedish Red Polled received official recognition in 2004, while the Fjäll has divided into two sub-breeds, the Fjällnära Boskap and the Svensk Fjällras.

== History ==
The Swedish Polled was created in 1937 with the intention of merging the Swedish Red Polled (Swedish: Rödkulla) with the Fjällras, a quite different breed of mountain cattle. Breeders did not accept the new classification, and continued to maintain separate bloodlines as before. A breeders' association, the Sveriges Rödkulleförening, was formed for the Rödkulla in the 1960s, and a similar association, the Föreningen Svensk Fjällrasavel, was established for the Fjäll breed in 1996. In 2004 the Rödkulla received official recognition: a breed number (40) was assigned to it by the Statens Jordbruksverk, the Swedish board of agriculture. Two different types of Fjäll cattle are reported to DAD-IS: the Fjällnära Boskap and the Svensk Fjällras.

In 2014 the total number reported for the Swedish Polled was 3074.

== Characteristics ==
The Swedish Polled may be either solid red, or red and white. It is polled – without horns – and is well adapted to conditions in the mountains of Sweden.

== Use ==
The Swedish Polled is considered a dairy breed. It constitutes about 0.5% of the national dairy herd.
