= Fjäll =

Swedish breed of cattle

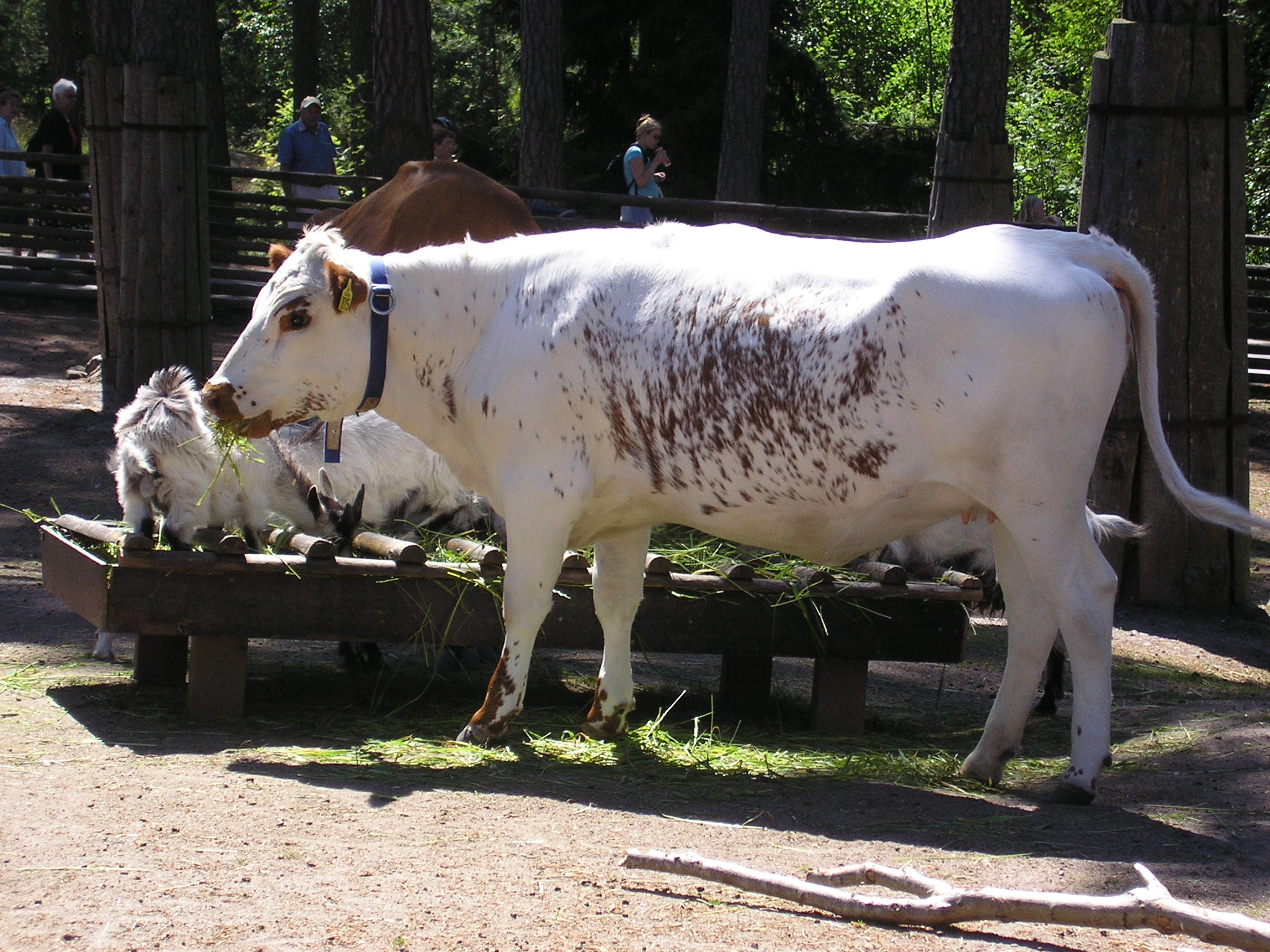
- A heifer
- Conservation status: FAO (2007): not at risk
- Other names: Swedish: Fjällko; Swedish: Svensk Fjällras; Swedish Mountain
- Country of origin: Sweden
- Distribution: northern Sweden
- Use: dairy

Traits
- Weight: Male: 650–800 kg; Female: 450 kg
- Height: Male: 135–140 cm; Female: 125 cm
- Coat: variable
- Horn status: polled

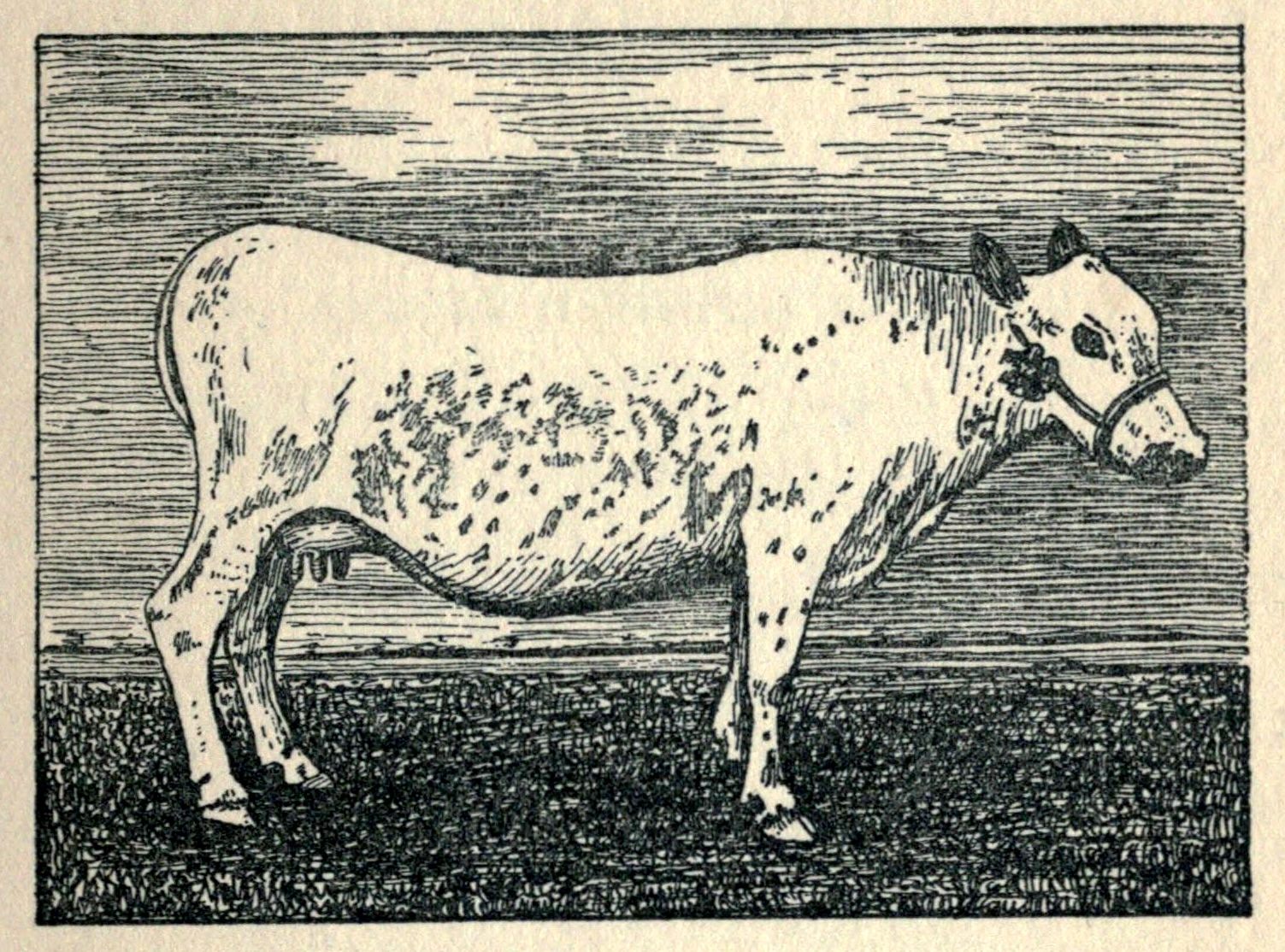
Image from Gustav Sundbärg, Sweden, 1904

The Fjäll (Swedish: Fjällko or Svensk fjällras) is a traditional Swedish breed of polled mountain cattle. It was threatened with extinction in the 1970s and 1980s, but recovered after a breed association was formed in 1995, partly thanks to stocks of frozen semen. Microsatellite analysis has shown it to be closely related to the endangered Bohuskulla breed.

== History ==
There have long been small polled mountain cattle in Sweden. A text from 1296 AD describes cattle that are "small, hornless, white or whitish grey, often with dark spots".

The Fjällras was established as a breed in the nineteenth century. A herd-book was started in 1907.

The traditional mountain cattle breeds were very variable. In 1937 a new breed, the Swedish Polled (Swedish: Svensk kullig boskap or SKB) was created with the intention of merging the Fjällras with the Swedish Red Polled (Swedish: Rödkulla), a quite different breed of mountain cattle. However, breeders did not accept the new classification, and continued to maintain separate bloodlines as before. During the 1970s and 1980s indiscriminate cross-breeding placed the breed in danger of extinction. A breeders' association, the Föreningen Svensk Fjällrasavel, was established in 1996; a similar association, the Sveriges Rödkulleförening, had formed for the Rödkulla in the 1960s.

Stocks of frozen semen from pure-bred Fjällras bulls born in the mid-twentieth century helped in the recovery of the breed, and allowed the effective population size to be increased. In 1996 it was estimated that there were approximately 400 Fjällras cows. In 2012 a total population of 6836 head was reported.

The traditional Fjäll has divided into two sub-breeds, the Svensk Fjällras and the Fjällnära Boskap.

== Characteristics ==
The coat colour of the Fjällras is variable: it may be almost white; white speckled with red or black; colour-sided red or black with finching; or, occasionally, solid red, black or – more rarely – grey. The skin is white. The cattle are well adapted to the mountain environment and forage well on poor pasture.

== Use ==
The Fjällras is principally a dairy breed. Average milk yield is approximately 5500 kg of milk per lactation; some cows may give 11000–12000 kg. The milk has a high butter-fat content, approximately 4.5%, and a protein content of about 3.6%; it is particularly rich in κ-casein B and is suitable for making cheese.
