= Sätofta =

- Location within Skåne Location within Sweden
- Coordinates: 55°55′N 13°33′E
- Country: Sweden
- Province: Skåne
- County: Skåne County
- Municipality: Höör Municipality

Area
  - Total: 1.74 km^{2} (0.67 sq mi)

Population (31 December 2010)
  - Total: 1,348
  - Density: 776/km^{2} (2,010/sq mi)
- Time zone: UTC+1 (CET)
  - Summer (DST): UTC+2 (CEST)

Sätofta is a locality in Höör Municipality, Skåne County, Sweden, with 1,348 inhabitants as of 2010.
