= English Longhorn =

British breed of cattle

English Longhorn Cattle
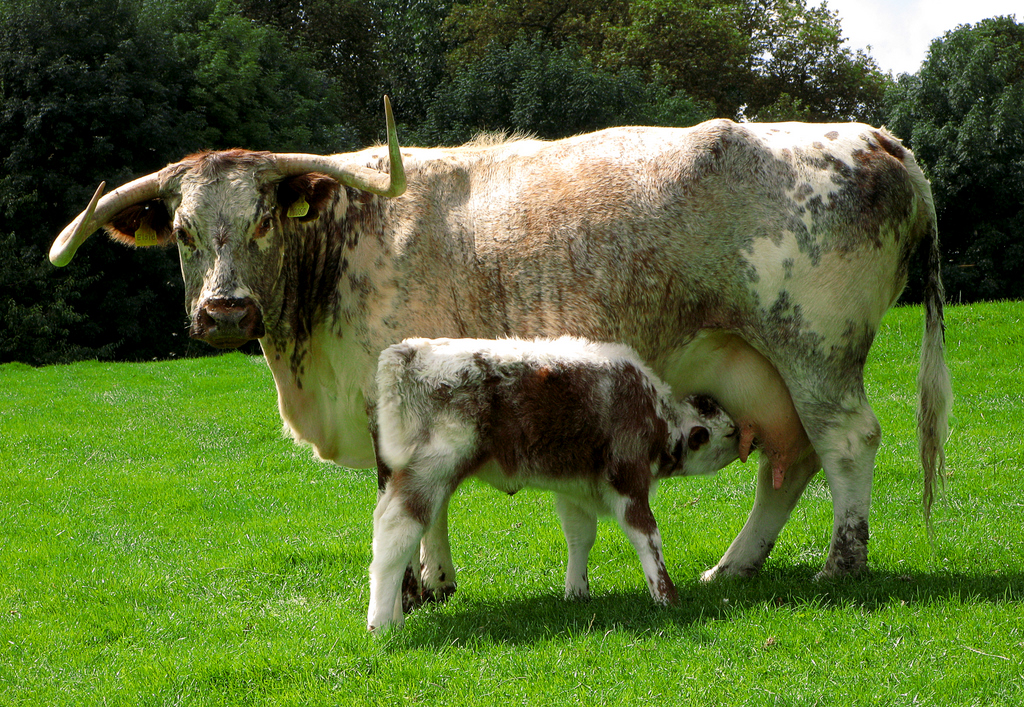
- Cow and calf
- Conservation status: FAO (2007): not at risk; DAD-IS (2021): at risk; RBST (2021): UK native breeds
- Country of origin: United Kingdom
- Distribution: Australia; Holland; Ireland; New Zealand; United Kingdom
- Standard: The Longhorn Cattle Society
- Use: beef, formerly draught and dairy

Traits
- Weight: Male: usually: 750–900 kg; maximum: over 1000kg; Female: 500–600 kg
- Height: Male: 150 cm; Female: 130–140 cm
- Coat: variable: red, brown or grey and white, finched
- Horn status: long curved horns
- Cattle; Bos (primigenius) taurus

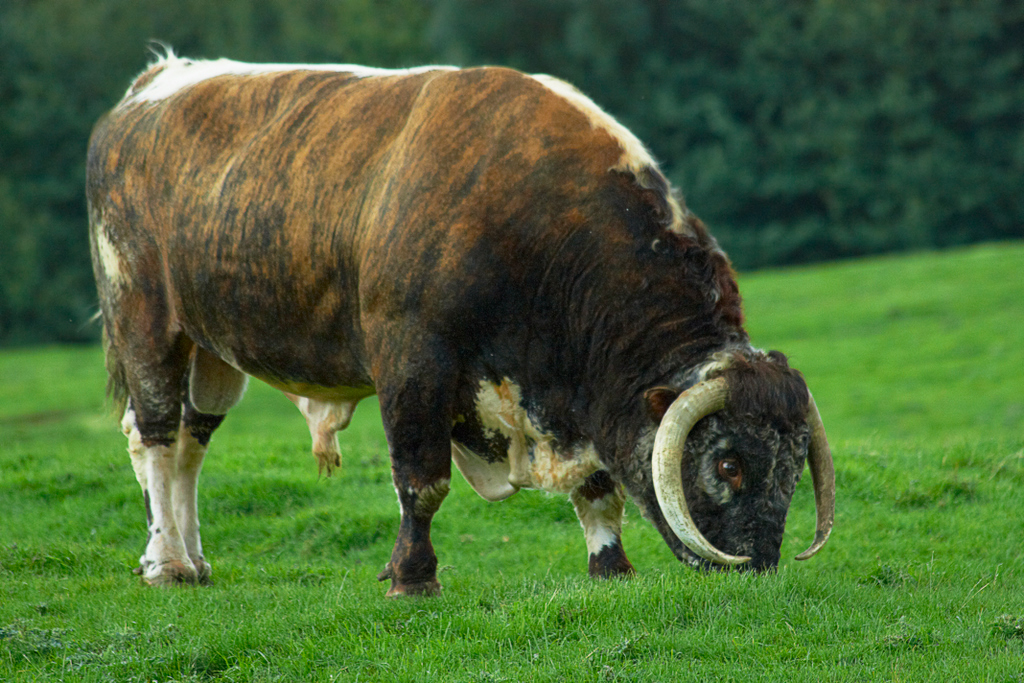
Bull at Quenby Hall, Leicestershire

The Longhorn or British Longhorn is a British breed of beef cattle characterised by long curving horns. It originated in northern England, in the counties of Lancashire, Westmorland and Yorkshire, and later spread to the English Midlands and to Ireland. It was originally a slow heavy draught animal; cows gave a little milk, although high in fat. In the eighteenth century Robert Bakewell applied his methods of selective breeding to these cattle, which for a short time became the predominant British breed. Both the numbers and the quality of the breed declined throughout the nineteenth century and for much of the twentieth. A breed society was formed in 1878, and a herd-book published in that year.

The Longhorn was formerly listed as "priority" on the watchlist of the Rare Breeds Survival Trust, but in 2021 was listed among the "UK native breeds".

The cattle are variable in colour, but are always finched – with a heavy line of white along the spine, tail and underside of the belly.

== History ==
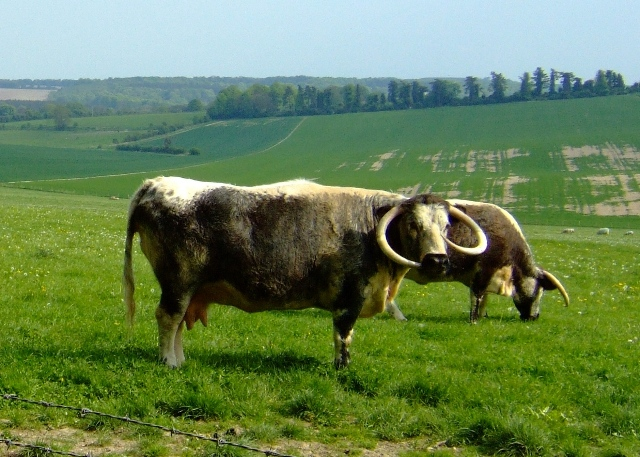
On Parsonage Down, in Wiltshire

The ancestors of the Longhorn originated in northern England, principally in the northern part of Lancashire, in southern Westmorland and in Yorkshire, particularly in the Craven district of the West Riding. They later spread to the English Midlands and to Ireland.

The Longhorn was originally a slow heavy draught animal; cows gave a little milk, although high in fat. In the eighteenth century Robert Bakewell, of Dishley in Leicestershire, applied his methods of selective breeding to these cattle; his "Dishley Longhorn" was highly successful, and for a short time became the predominant British breed. After his death in 1795 it began to decline, and within a short time was supplanted by the Shorthorn as the principal breed in the country. Both the numbers and the quality of the breed decreased throughout the nineteenth century and for much of the twentieth. A breed society was formed in 1878, and a herd-book published in that year.

The Longhorn was formerly listed as "priority" on the watchlist of the Rare Breeds Survival Trust, but in 2021 was listed among the "UK native breeds".

Some of the cattle have been exported to countries outside the British Isles. They are present in Australia, and there are small numbers in Holland and New Zealand. A population in Belgium appears to have become extinct.

== Characteristics ==
The cattle are variable in colour, but are always finched – with a heavy line of white along the spine, tail and underside of the belly.

== Use ==
The Longhorn was originally a slow heavy draught animal, used for ploughing; the milk yield was not high, but the milk was rich in fat and from the eighteenth century was used for cheese-making, particularly in Cheshire. As with other draught breeds, oxen at the end of their working lives could be fattened and sent for slaughter.

In the twenty-first century the cattle are reared principally for beef. They are also used for vegetation management in nature parks and Sites of Special Scientific Interest.
