= Swedish Friesian =

Breed of cattle

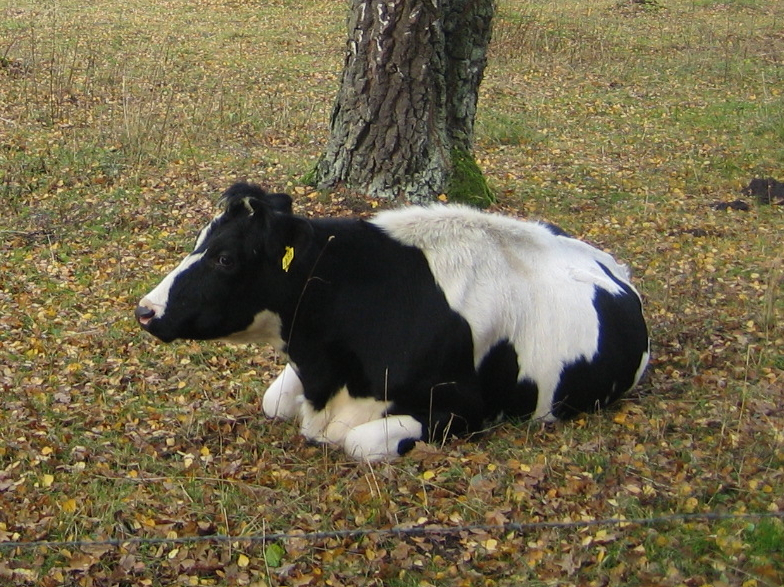
- Conservation status: FAO (2007): not at risk
- Other names: Swedish: Svensk låglandsboskap; SLB
- Country of origin: Sweden
- Distribution: nationwide
- Use: milk

Traits
- Weight: Male: 1200 kg; Female: 650 kg
- Coat: black-and-white pied
- Horn status: horned in both sexes
- Cattle; Bos (primigenius) taurus

The Swedish Friesian, Swedish: Svensk Låglandsboskap, often abbreviated to SLB, is a Swedish breed of dairy cattle. It was established in about 1870 from imports of cattle of Dutch Friesian or German Black Pied type. From about 1970 it has been systematically cross-bred with the American Holstein-Friesian breed, to the point that the original Swedish type may be extinct. The name Swedish Holstein may also be used.

== History ==
The Swedish Friesian or Svensk Låglandsboskap originated in about 1870 with imports of black-and-white pied dairy cattle of Dutch Friesian and German Black Pied type. A herd-book was established in 1880. The Svensk Låglandsboskap became the most numerous dairy breed in southern Sweden. Selective breeding in the 1940s and 1950s led to stock shorter in the leg and broader in the body than the original types. During the 1960s the breed spread through much of Sweden. In 2001 the Svensk Låglandsboskap constituted 47% of the national dairy herd, fractionally less than the Swedish Red-and-White.

In about 1970, importation to Sweden of semen from American Holstein-Friesian bulls began. Between 1970 and 2005, the proportion of Holstein alleles in Swedish Friesian cows rose from 6% to more than 90%; in bulls the proportion rose even more. The original Swedish Friesian type has become very rare, and should perhaps be considered extinct.

In 2008 two breeds were reported to DAD-IS: the Svensk Holstein or Swedish Holstein, with just over 400000 registered cows; and the Svensk Låglandsboskap or Swedish Friesian, with 100 registered cows and a conservation status of "critical". In 2014 the breed was reported as "Svensk låglandsboskap (holstein friesian)", with a population of just under 560000.

== Characteristics ==
The coat of the Swedish Friesian is black-and-white pied. Bulls weigh approximately 1200 kg, cows about 650 kg.

== Use ==
The Swedish Friesian is a dairy breed, kept principally for its milk.
