= Höör =

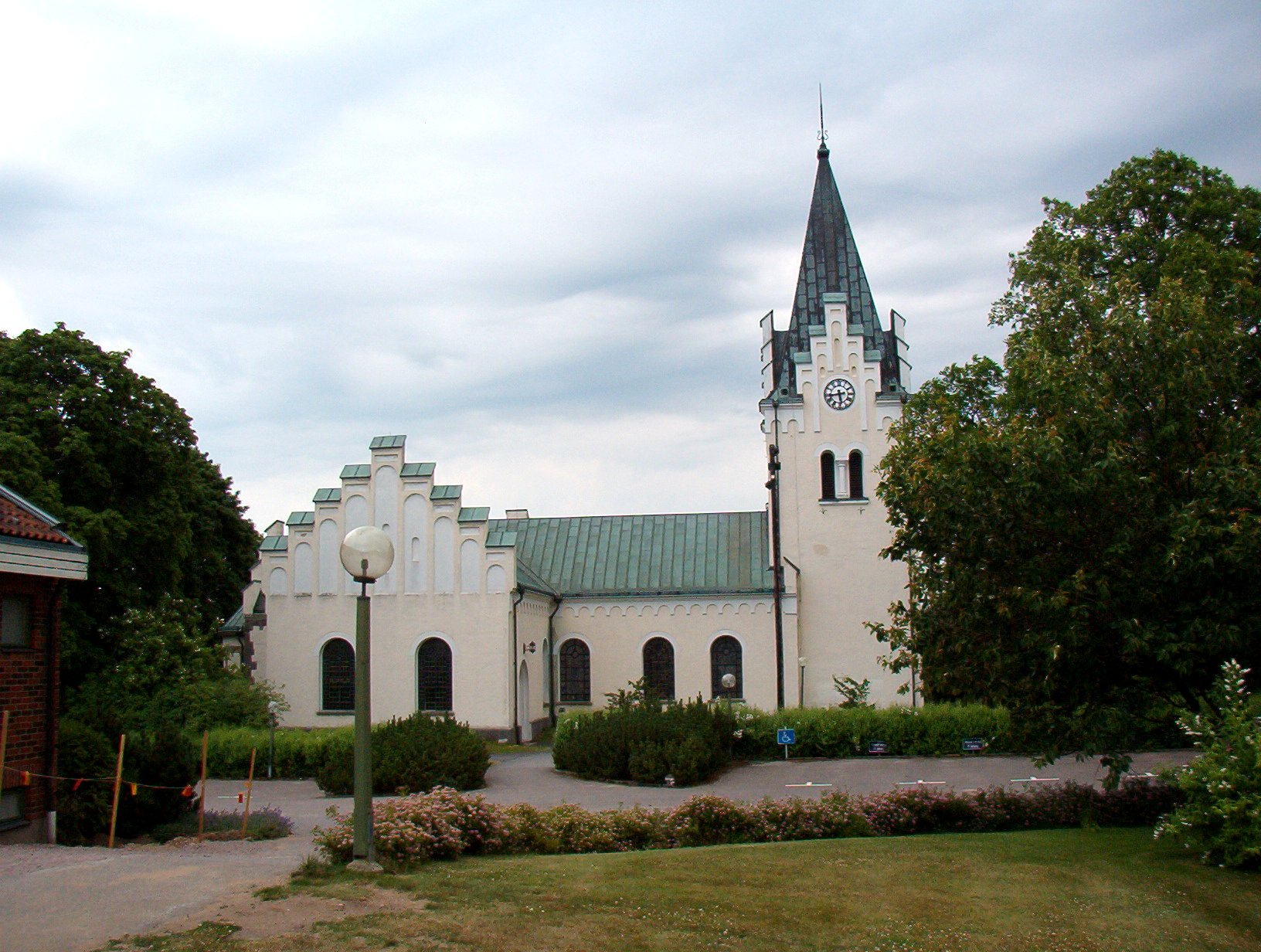
- Höör Church

- Location within Skåne Location within Sweden
- Coordinates: 55°56′10″N 13°32′50″E
- Country: Sweden
- Province: Skåne
- County: Skåne County
- Municipality: Höör Municipality

Area
  - Total: 16.64 km^{2} (6.42 sq mi)

Population (31 December 2020)
  - Total: 12,976
  - Density: 779.8/km^{2} (2,020/sq mi)
- Time zone: UTC+1 (CET)
  - Summer (DST): UTC+2 (CEST)

Höör (formerly spelled Hör, Swedish pronunciation: [ˈhœːr]) is a locality and the seat of Höör Municipality, Skåne County, Sweden with 7,865 inhabitants in 2010.

== Name ==
The town was previously known as Hørg (in the 12th century), Hørgh (in the 15th century), and later Hør and Hör. The present, unusual spelling with double "ö" was implemented by the Swedish postal service at the beginning of the 20th century. At that time, it was a common practice in Sweden to write här (for here) in the address of letters to be delivered within the same town. In order to avoid confusion between letters to be delivered locally and those intended for Hör, the postal service changed the town's name to Höör.

== Transport ==
Höör railway station is located on the northern side of the town and a five-minute walk into the central square. It is on the line between Kristianstad and Malmö, where there are frequent commuter trains running beyond Sweden to Copenhagen in Denmark.

The following services call at this station (incomplete):

- Regional train (Øresundståg Regional): Karlskrona – Kristianstad – Hässleholm – Höör – Lund – Malmö – Copenhagen Airport (København Lufthavn) – Copenhagen Central (København H) – Østerport
- Regional train (Skånetrafiken Express): Alvesta – Hässleholm – Höör – Eslöv – Lund – Malmö
- Regional train (Skånetrafiken Regional): Höör – Eslöv – Lund – Malmö – Ystad – Simrishamn

== Sports ==
The local handball team H 65 Höör won the Swedish Women's Championship in 2017.
