= Swedish Red Polled =

Swedish breed of cattle

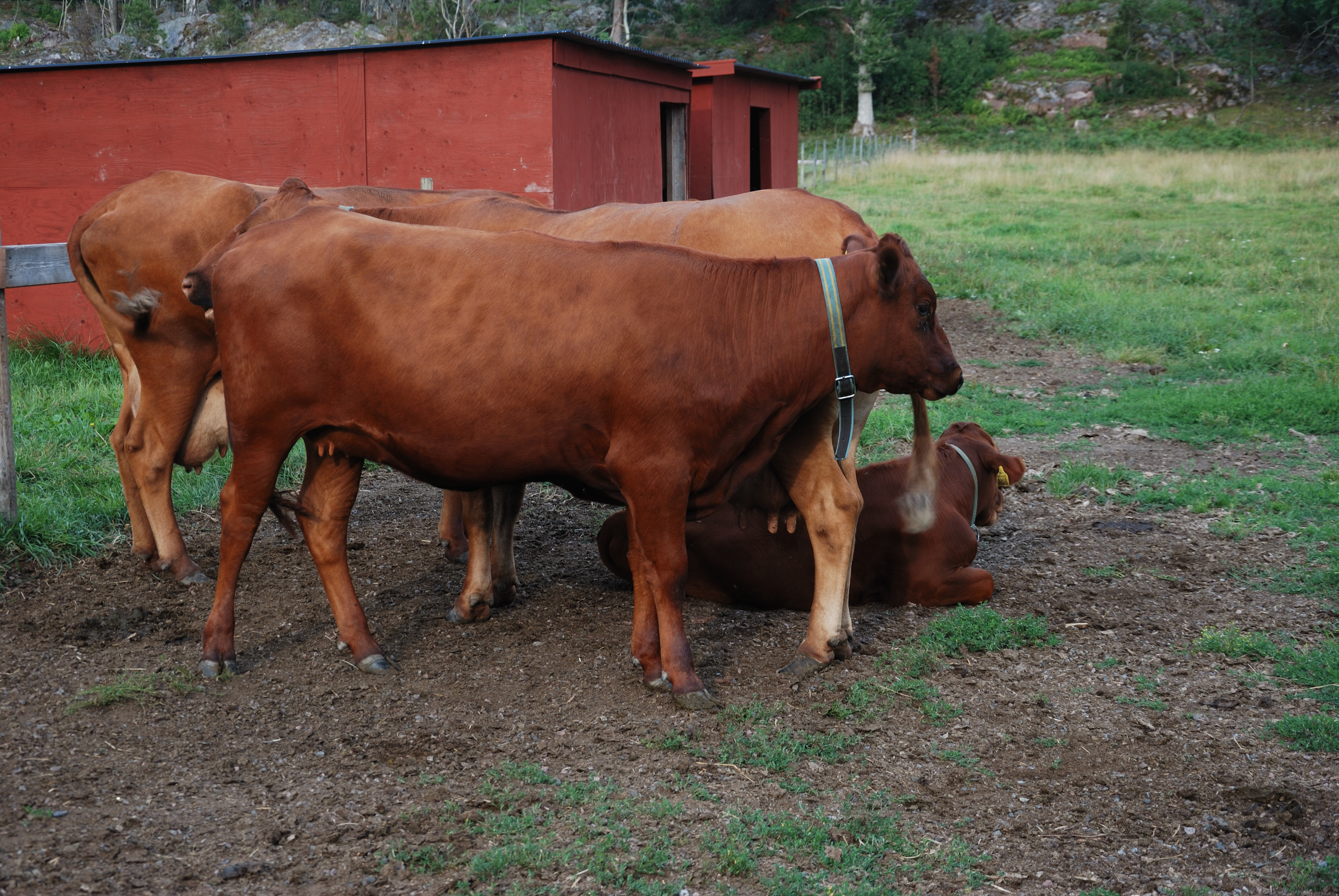
- Conservation status: FAO (2007): not at risk
- Other names: Swedish: Rödkulla; Swedish Red Poll
- Country of origin: Sweden
- Use: dual-purpose, milk and meat

Traits
- Weight: Female: 350–600 kg
- Coat: red, sometimes with white markings
- Horn status: polled (hornless)
- Cattle; Bos (primigenius) taurus

The Swedish Red Polled, Swedish: Rödkulla, is a Swedish breed of domestic cattle. It is a dual-purpose breed, raised both for its milk and for its meat.

== History ==
The Swedish Red Polled is a traditional Swedish breed. It was commonly raised in the landskap of Dalarna and along the west coast of the country. A herd-book was established in 1912, and the breed began to spread. By the late 1930s it was present not only in Dalarna but in Bohuslän, Dalsland, Gästrikland, Hälsingland, Närke, the Stockholm archipelago, Uppland, Värmland and Västmanland. There were about 30 000 head.

In 1937 a new breed, the Swedish Polled (Swedish: Svensk Kullig Boskap or SKB), was created with the intention of merging the Rödkulla with the Fjällras, a quite different breed of mountain cattle. Breeders did not accept the new classification, and continued to maintain separate bloodlines as before. A breeders' association, the Sveriges Rödkulleförening, was formed in the 1960s. Nevertheless, the population declined steeply. By the late 1970s it had fallen to a low of about 20 head of pure-bred stock, and conservation efforts began. In the recovery process some use was made of imported stock of similar breeds from Finland and Norway (Ostlandsk Roedkolle and Vestlandsk Raudkolle). In 2004 the Rödkulla received official recognition: a breed number (40) was assigned to it by the Statens Jordbruksverk, the Swedish board of agriculture.

In 2009 there were about 1200 cows and 400 bulls of the breed; semen from a further 70 bulls was available for artificial insemination.

== Characteristics ==
The Swedish Red Polled is solid red; it may sometimes have white markings. It is always polled; horned animals may not be registered. It forages well and tolerates extremes of cold.

== Use ==
The Rödkulla is a dual-purpose breed. It gives about 5500 kg of milk per year. Stock for slaughter reaches a weight of 250–400 kg in 30 months.
