= Swedish Red-and-White =

Breed of cattle

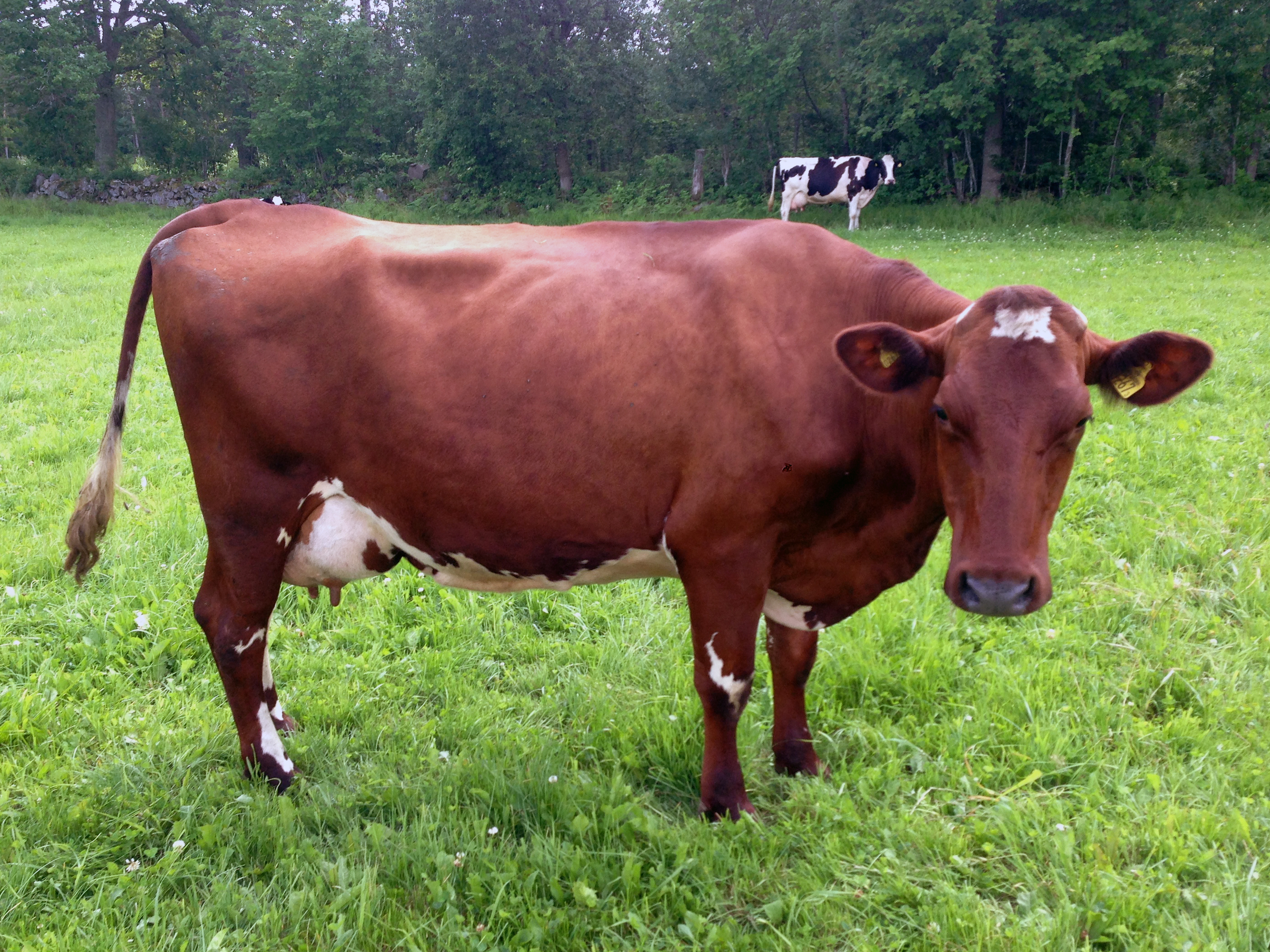
- Conservation status: FAO (2007): not at risk
- Other names: Swedish: Svensk röd och vit boskap; SRB
- Country of origin: Sweden
- Distribution: nationwide
- Use: milk

Traits
- Weight: Male: 1050 kg; Female: 550 kg
- Coat: red and white
- Horn status: horned in both sexes
- Cattle; Bos (primigenius) taurus

The Swedish Red-and-White (Swedish: Svensk röd och vit boskap; SRB) is a Swedish breed of dairy cattle. It was created in the 1920s by crossing the Swedish Red Pied and Swedish Ayrshire breeds.

== History ==
The Swedish Red-and-White breed was formed in 1927 or 1928 by merging the populations of the Swedish Red Pied and Swedish Ayrshire breeds. The traditional Herrgård, Skåne and Småland breeds had already been merged into the Swedish Red Pied at some time between 1892 and 1928. All four of these constituent breeds are now reported to DAD-IS as extinct.

The Swedish Red-and-White is one of the two principal dairy breeds of Sweden, and in 2001 constituted almost 48% of the national dairy herd, just barely outnumbering the Swedish Friesian breed. In 2014 the total population was reported at just under 354 000.

== Characteristics ==
The Swedish Red-and-White is red with white markings.

== Use ==
The Swedish Red-and-White is a dairy breed. The milk has a fat content of 4.3%.
