= Colour-sided =

Coat pattern of cattle

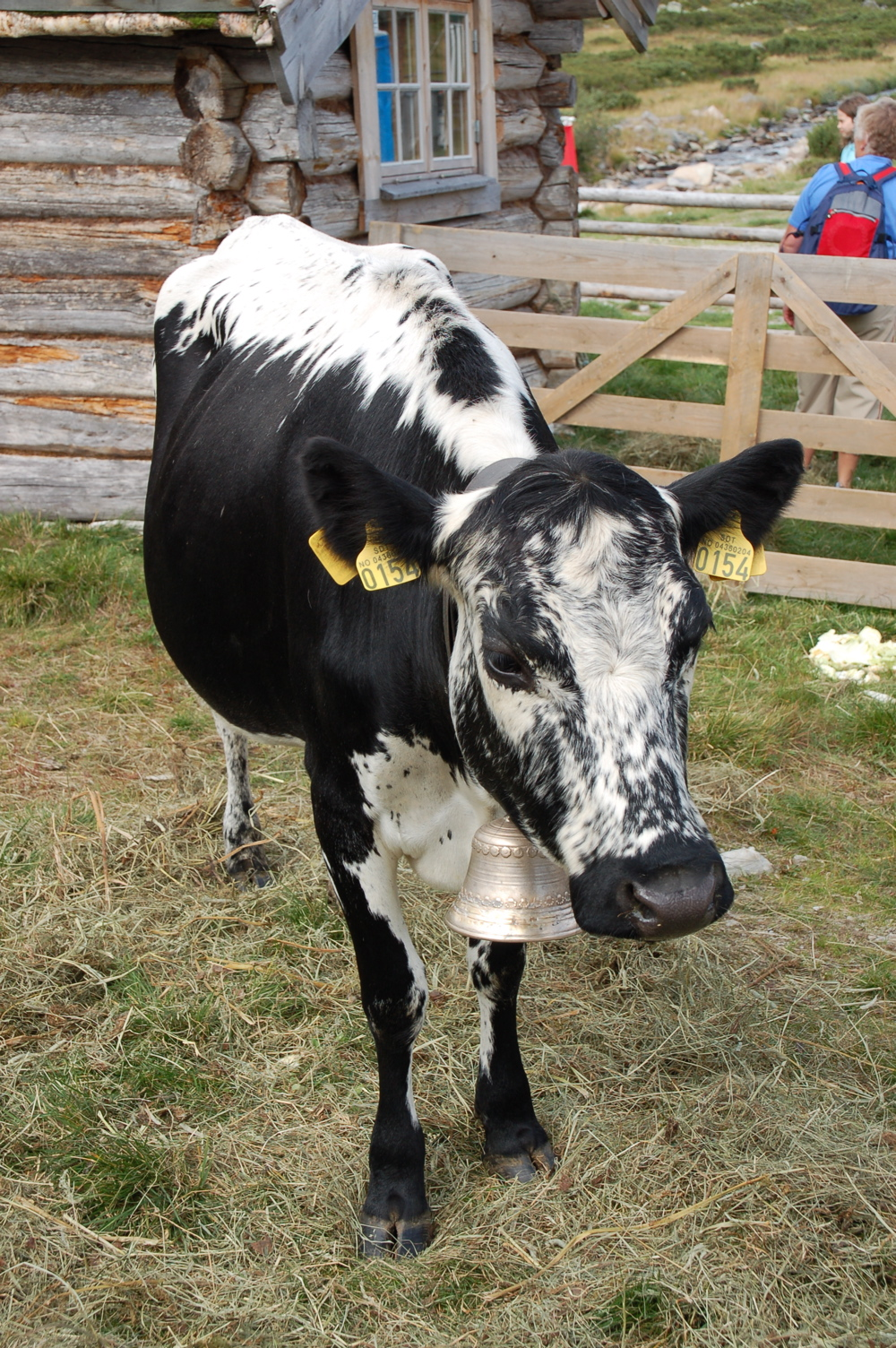
Cow of the Norwegian Sidet trønderfe og nordlandsfe breed

Colour-sided is a colour pattern of domesticated cattle. It is sometimes called lineback.

== Characteristics ==
The pattern consists of a dark body colour, with white finching along the spine, white under the belly, and often white also over the tail, head and legs. The ears, nose and feet are generally dark. The dark colour may be any solid colour such as black, red or brindle. The pattern may occur in many breeds, but some breeds are consistently colour-sided; these include the English Longhorn, and the Irish Moiled in the British Isles, and the Randall Lineback in the United States. Among other breeds that frequently display the pattern are the Texas Longhorn, the Florida Cracker and some African and Scandinavian breeds; it is also seen in the Belgian Blue, where it is called 'Witrik'. A similar colour pattern is seen in the domestic yak and in some zebuine cattle.

An extreme pale form of the colour-sided pattern is the colour-pointed or 'white park' pattern, seen for example in the White Park, the British White and in some Irish Moiled, where the darker colour is restricted to the ears, nose and feet, leaving most of the animal white.

== Genetics ==
Colour-sidedness was discussed in The Journal of Heredity in 1925 by Christian Wriedt, who probably coined the term.

The mechanism of transmission of the colour-pointed pattern was identified and investigated in 2011–2013 by Keith Durkin, Bertram Brenig and others. It involves an unusual translocation, through a ring-shaped intermediate DNA fragment, of the KIT gene between chromosomes 6 and 29. No genetic mutation of this type had previously been identified.
