= Swedish Red Pied =

Breed of cattle

- Conservation status: FAO (2007): extinct
- Other names: Swedish: Rödbrokig Svensk Boskap; RSB
- Country of origin: Sweden
- Use: milk

Traits
- Coat: red and white
- Horn status: horned in both sexes
- Cattle; Bos (primigenius) taurus

The Swedish Red Pied (Swedish: Rödbrokig Svensk Boskap), sometimes abbreviated to RSB, was a Swedish breed of dairy cattle. It is now considered extinct. It was merged in the 1920s with the Swedish Ayrshire breed to create the Swedish Red-and-White (Swedish: Svensk Röd och Vit Boskap or SRB), which is one of the principal dairy breeds of Sweden.

== History ==
The Swedish Red Pied originated in the nineteenth century from cross-breeding of local cattle with imported Ayrshire and Shorthorn stock. A herd-book was established in 1892. At some time between then and 1928, the traditional Herrgård, Skåne and Småland breeds were merged into the Swedish Red Pied; they are thus considered to be extinct. In the 1920s the Swedish Red Pied population was large; however, it suffered from competition from the Swedish Ayrshire.

In either 1927 or 1928 the Swedish Red Pied and Swedish Ayrshire breeds were merged to create the new Swedish Red-and-White (Swedish: Svensk Röd och Vit Boskap or SRB), which is one of the two principal dairy breeds of Sweden.
