= Sgeir Cùl an Rubha =

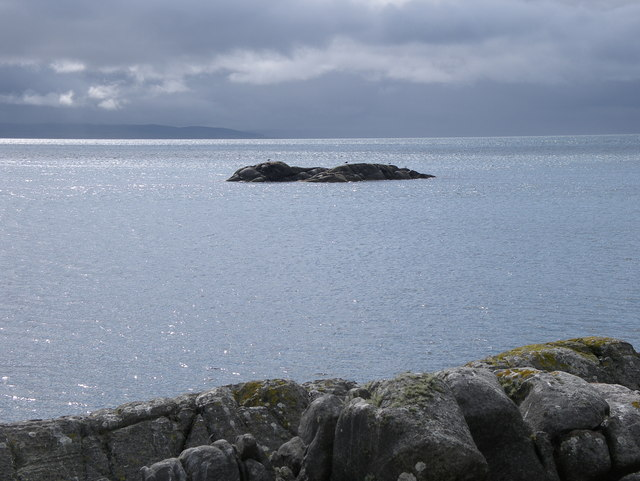
- Interactive map of Sgeir Cùl an Rubha

Geography
- Location: St Kilda
- OS grid reference: NF104971
- Archipelago: St Kilda
- Adjacent to: Dùn

Sgeir Cùl an Rubha (Scottish Gaelic: "Skerry behind the headland") is an uninhabited islet in the St Kilda archipelago Outer Hebrides, Scotland. It is immediately south of Dùn, an island separated from Hirta by a narrow straight.

== Etymology ==
Sgeir Cùl an Rubha translates literally to "The Skerry behind the Headland." Sgeir is derived from the Old Norse word "sker," which means rock in the sea. Sgeir is specifically used to mean reef or islet. Cùl means back or behind. It is a Gaelic word used to indicate the location of features in relation to other, often more prominent, features. In this context it means the location of the islet is behind or at the back of another (Dùn).

== History ==
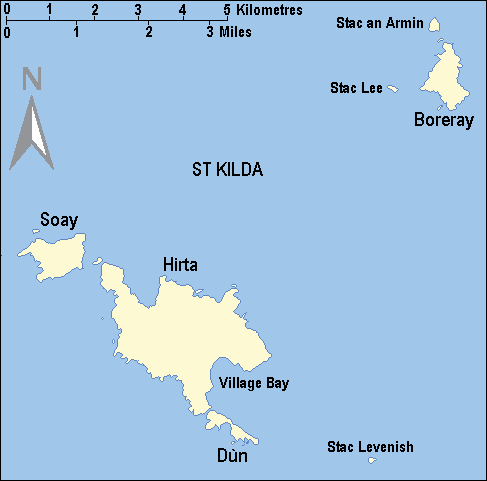
Map of the St Kilda Archipelago

The islet had always been seen as a hazard by St. Kildans, especially to vessels entering or exiting Village Bay or observing Dùn, which Sgeir Cùl an Rubha is directly adjacent to. The skerry is, while not completely submerged, hard to spot at high tide, as it lies very low in the water. As such, it is, and always has been, a danger to sailors. Therefore, the St. Kildans aptly named it the skerry behind the headland, which pinpointed its position through its name; therefore, vessels were aware of its position- behind the 'headland' (which Dùn closely resembled).

Sgeir Cùl an Rubha was professionally unmapped underwater throughout much of the 20th century. It was an undived islet which meant that its features, including a 30m southwest underwater dropoff, were not surveyed until quite recently.

== Geology ==
Sgeir Cùl an Rubha is composed of Tertiary intrusive igneous rocks, mainly gabbro and dolerite The islet is part of the St Kilda Central Complex, which is the remnant of a 60 million-year-old ring volcano.
