= 1999 Highland Council election =

1999 Scottish local government election

← 1995	6 May 1999	2003 →

All 80 seats to Highland Council 41 seats needed for a majority

	First party	Second party	Third party
Party	Independent	Liberal Democrats	Labour
Last election	49 seats, 61.2%	7 seats, 7.7%	7 seats, 12.2%
Seats won	49	12	10
Seat change	Steady	▲5	▲3
Popular vote	43,810	8,108	11,756
Percentage	57.4%	10.6%	15.4%
Swing	▼3.8%	▲3.9%	▲4.4%
	Fourth party	Fifth party
Party	SNP	Independent Liberal
Last election	9 seats, 17.4%	Did not contest
Seats won	8	1
Seat change	▼1	▲1
Popular vote	9,456	695
Percentage	12.4%	0.9%
Swing	▼5.0%	New
- Map showing results by ward
Council Convener before election
Peter Peacock
Independent
Council Convener after election
David Green
Independent

The 1999 Highland Council election was held on 6 May 1999; the same day as elections to the Scottish Parliament and to the 31 other councils in Scotland. 80 councillors were elected from 80 wards using the plurality system (a.k.a. 'First Past the Post'). Independent councillors retained their status as the majority group, with councillors also being elected representing the Labour Party, Liberal Democrats, and Scottish National Party.

== Results ==
1999 Highland Council election result
Party	Seats	Gains	Losses	Net gain/loss	Seats %	Votes %	Votes	+/−
Independent	49			Steady	61.3	57.4	43,810	▼3.8
Liberal Democrats	12			▲6	15.0	10.6	8,108	▲3.9
Labour	10			▲3	12.5	15.4	11,756	▲4.4
SNP	8			▼1	10.0	12.4	9,456	▼5.0
Independent Liberal	1			▲1	1.3	0.9	695	New
Conservative	0			▼1	0.0	3.3	2,509	▲2.4

Note: there were 8 more seats at this election than at the previous election on 6 April 1995.

== Ward results ==
The Highland Council election, 1999: Caithness North-West
Party	Candidate	Votes	%	±%
Liberal Democrats	Alastair MacDonald	680		
Independent	John Mowat	480		
Majority		200		

The Highland Council election, 1999: Thurso West
Party	Candidate	Votes	%	±%
Labour	Eric Saxon	454		
Independent	James Fry	407		
Independent	George Bruce	357		
Majority		47		

The Highland Council election, 1999: Thurso Central
Party	Candidate	Votes	%	±%
Labour	John Rosie	553		
Independent	Elizabeth MacDonald	482		
Independent	Ronald Henderson	198		
Majority		71		

The Highland Council election, 1999: Thurso East
Party	Candidate	Votes	%	±%
Independent	Donald Waters	Unopposed		

The Highland Council election, 1999: Caithness Central
Party	Candidate	Votes	%	±%
Liberal Democrats	David Flear	Unopposed		

The Highland Council election, 1999: Caithness North-East
Party	Candidate	Votes	%	±%
Independent	John Green	793		
Independent	David Richard	580		
Majority		213		

The Highland Council election, 1999: Wick
Party	Candidate	Votes	%	±%
Liberal Democrats	Graeme Smith	447		
Labour	Bill Mowat	402		
Independent	Anderson Murray	376		
Majority		45		

The Highland Council election, 1999: Wick West
Party	Candidate	Votes	%	±%
Labour	Deirdre Steven	463		
Independent	William Fernie	438		
Independent	Alistair Roy	333		
Majority		25		

The Highland Council election, 1999: Pulteneytown
Party	Candidate	Votes	%	±%
Independent	Jim Oag	673		
Independent	Niall Smith	437		
Majority		236		

The Highland Council election, 1999: Caithness South-East
Party	Candidate	Votes	%	±%
Independent Liberal	William Mowat	695		
Independent	Jeanette Calder	522		
Majority		173		

The Highland Council election, 1999: Sutherland North-West
Party	Candidate	Votes	%	±%
Independent	Francis Keith	Unopposed		

The Highland Council election, 1999: Tongue and Farr
Party	Candidate	Votes	%	±%
Liberal Democrats	Barbara Jardine	539		
Independent	Alexander Mackay	514		
Majority		25		

The Highland Council election, 1999: Sutherland Central
Party	Candidate	Votes	%	±%
Independent	Alison Magee	725		
Independent	Russell Taylor	470		
Independent	Alexander Chalmers	186		
Majority		255		

The Highland Council election, 1999: Golspie and Rogart
Party	Candidate	Votes	%	±%
Independent	Ian Ross	687		
Independent	Helen Houston	373		
Independent	Valerie Scott	150		
Majority		314		

The Highland Council election, 1999: Brora
Party	Candidate	Votes	%	±%
Independent	Rita Finlayson	802		
Independent	Ronald McDonald	662		
Majority		140		

The Highland Council election, 1999: Dornoch Firth
Party	Candidate	Votes	%	±%
Independent	Duncan Allan	1,104		
Independent	Gordon Campbell	306		
Majority		798		

The Highland Council election, 1999: Lochbroom
Party	Candidate	Votes	%	±%
Independent	David Green	Unopposed		

The Highland Council election, 1999: Alness and Ardross
Party	Candidate	Votes	%	±%
SNP	Andrew Anderson	Unopposed		

The Highland Council election, 1999: Tain West
Party	Candidate	Votes	%	±%
Independent	Alasdair Rhind	1,040		
SNP	Derek Louden	415		
Majority		625		

The Highland Council election, 1999: Tain East
Party	Candidate	Votes	%	±%
Independent	James Paterson	Unopposed		

The Highland Council election, 1999: Seaboard
Party	Candidate	Votes	%	±%
Independent	Richard Durham	747		
Labour	John Mitchell	493		
Majority		254		

The Highland Council election, 1999: Invergordon
Party	Candidate	Votes	%	±%
Labour	Lou Wilkerson	622		
SNP	Morag McCourt	355		
Independent	Maxine Smith	320		
Majority		267		

The Highland Council election, 1999: Rosskeen and Saltburn
Party	Candidate	Votes	%	±%
Independent	Carolyn Wilson	568		
Independent	Norman Chisholm	350		
SNP	Andrew Currie	302		
Labour	John Boocock	270		
Majority		218		

The Highland Council election, 1999: Gairloch
Party	Candidate	Votes	%	±%
Independent	Roy Macintyre	857		
SNP	Kris Murray Browne	260		
Majority		597		

The Highland Council election, 1999: Lochcarron
Party	Candidate	Votes	%	±%
Independent	Ewan Mackinnon	518		
Independent	Elizabeth Pritchard	399		
Independent	Allan MacArthur	143		
Majority		119		

The Highland Council election, 1999: Ferindonald
Party	Candidate	Votes	%	±%
Independent	Mike Finlayson	848		
SNP	Robert Gibson	627		
Majority		221		

The Highland Council election, 1999: Strathpeffer and Strathconon
Party	Candidate	Votes	%	±%
Independent	Douglas Briggs	959		
Conservative	Bill Mackenzie	309		
Majority		650		

The Highland Council election, 1999: Dingwall South
Party	Candidate	Votes	%	±%
SNP	Margaret Paterson	Unopposed		

The Highland Council election, 1999: Dingwall North
Party	Candidate	Votes	%	±%
Independent	Andrew Paterson	Unopposed		

The Highland Council election, 1999: Muir of Ord
Party	Candidate	Votes	%	±%
Independent	David Philip	789		
SNP	John MacInnes	572		
Majority		217		

The Highland Council election, 1999: Conon and Maryburgh
Party	Candidate	Votes	%	±%
Independent	Sandy MacKenzie	743		
Independent	Evelyn Vass	703		
Majority		40		

The Highland Council election, 1999: Knockbain and Killearnan
Party	Candidate	Votes	%	±%
SNP	Peter Cairns	Unopposed		

The Highland Council election, 1999: Black Isle North
Party	Candidate	Votes	%	±%
Independent	David Alston	596		
Independent	Thomas Anderson	591		
SNP	Alistair Dunn	268		
Majority		5		

The Highland Council election, 1999: Avoch and Fortrose
Party	Candidate	Votes	%	±%
Independent	Morris Downie	865		
Independent	Duncan McPherson	502		
Conservative	Celia Stewart	383		
Majority		363		

The Highland Council election, 1999: Snizort and Trotternish
Party	Candidate	Votes	%	±%
SNP	Gavin Scott Moncrief	Unopposed		

The Highland Council election, 1999: Skye West
Party	Candidate	Votes	%	±%
Independent	Allan Beaton	Unopposed		

The Highland Council election, 1999: Portree
Party	Candidate	Votes	%	±%
Independent	Drew Millar	Unopposed		

The Highland Council election, 1999: Skye Central
Party	Candidate	Votes	%	±%
Independent	Angus Sutherland	715		
SNP	Farquhar MacLennan	322		
Majority		393		

The Highland Council election, 1999: Kyle and Sleat
Party	Candidate	Votes	%	±%
Independent	William Fulton	Unopposed		

The Highland Council election, 1999: Kinlochshiel
Party	Candidate	Votes	%	±%
Liberal Democrats	Isabelle Campbell	832		
Labour	Patricia Shaw	171		
Majority		661		

The Highland Council election, 1999: Beauly and Strathglass
Party	Candidate	Votes	%	±%
Independent	Garry Coutts	734		
Independent	John Sellar	577		
Majority		157		

The Highland Council election, 1999: Kirkhill
Party	Candidate	Votes	%	±%
Independent	Jack Shiels	906		
Independent	Molly Doyle	595		
Majority		311		

The Highland Council election, 1999: Scorguie
Party	Candidate	Votes	%	±%
Liberal Democrats	Bernard Salmon	815		
Labour	Jimmy MacDonald	622		
Majority		193		

The Highland Council election, 1999: Muirtown
Party	Candidate	Votes	%	±%
Labour	Christine Cumming	Unopposed		

The Highland Council election, 1999: Merkinch
Party	Candidate	Votes	%	±%
Independent	Peter Corbett	701		
SNP	Donnie Kerr	238		
Labour	Alexander MacLean	234		
Majority		463		

The Highland Council election, 1999: Inverness Central
Party	Candidate	Votes	%	±%
Labour	Eilidh MacDonald	514		
Independent	Jim Alexander	392		
SNP	Joerg Macthearlaich-Wiench	300		
Conservative	Moray MacDonald	190		
Majority		122		

The Highland Council election, 1999: Culloden
Party	Candidate	Votes	%	±%
Liberal Democrats	John Cole	667		
SNP	James McCreath	381		
Labour	John Ford	285		
Majority		286		

The Highland Council election, 1999: Ardersier, Croy, and Petty
Party	Candidate	Votes	%	±%
Independent	Roderick Balfour	612		
SNP	Derek MacDonald	461		
Liberal Democrats	Glynis Sinclair	353		
Majority		151		

The Highland Council election, 1999: Loch Ness West
Party	Candidate	Votes	%	±%
Independent	Margaret Davidson	1,018		
Independent	Patrick Paterson	483		
Majority		535		

The Highland Council election, 1999: Inverness West
Party	Candidate	Votes	%	±%
Independent	Ronald Lyon	708		
Labour	Debra Lake	452		
Majority		256		

The Highland Council election, 1999: Canal
Party	Candidate	Votes	%	±%
Independent	William Smith	941		
Labour	Mark Grant	453		
Majority		488		

The Highland Council election, 1999: Ballifeary
Party	Candidate	Votes	%	±%
Labour	Jim Thomson	820		
SNP	Robert McLennan	479		
Majority		341		

The Highland Council election, 1999: Lochardil
Party	Candidate	Votes	%	±%
Independent	Margaret MacLennan	1,037		
Labour	Andrew Ingram	546		
Majority		491		

The Highland Council election, 1999: Hilton
Party	Candidate	Votes	%	±%
Liberal Democrats	Angus Dick	541		
SNP	Stuart Dickson	431		
Labour	Alison Watson	273		
Majority		110		

The Highland Council election, 1999: Milton
Party	Candidate	Votes	%	±%
Labour	Clive Goodman	834		
Liberal Democrats	John Horne	602		
Majority		232		

The Highland Council election, 1999: Crown
Party	Candidate	Votes	%	±%
Liberal Democrats	Dick Simpson	636		
Independent	Patricia Hayden	434		
Labour	John Ward	335		
Conservative	Peter Saggers	191		
Majority		202		

The Highland Council election, 1999: Raigmore
Party	Candidate	Votes	%	±%
Labour	David Munro	Unopposed		

The Highland Council election, 1999: Loch Ness East
Party	Candidate	Votes	%	±%
Independent	Ella MacRae	Unopposed		

The Highland Council election, 1999: Culduthel
Party	Candidate	Votes	%	±%
Independent	Norrie Donald	817		
Labour	Kenneth Thomson	638		
Majority		179		

The Highland Council election, 1999: Inshes
Party	Candidate	Votes	%	±%
Independent	Janet Home	639		
SNP	Ian Brown	464		
Independent	John Holden	339		
Majority		175		

The Highland Council election, 1999: Drumossie
Party	Candidate	Votes	%	±%
Independent	Kathleen Matheson	919		
SNP	Robert Chalmers	518		
Majority		401		

The Highland Council election, 1999: Westhill and Smithton
Party	Candidate	Votes	%	±%
SNP	Gillian McCreath	442		
Labour	Malcolm Jack	425		
Independent	George Davidson	290		
Liberal Democrats	Jermaine Allison	240		
Majority		17		

The Highland Council election, 1999: Balloch
Party	Candidate	Votes	%	±%
SNP	Robert Wynd	596		
Labour	Walter McGarrity	512		
Conservative	William Cameron	445		
Majority		84		

The Highland Council election, 1999: Nairn Alltan
Party	Candidate	Votes	%	±%
Independent	John Matheson	662		
Independent	Andrew Gardiner	425		
Conservative	Tony Lister	312		
Majority		237		

The Highland Council election, 1999: Nairn Ninian
Party	Candidate	Votes	%	±%
SNP	Elizabeth MacDonald	450		
Independent	William Shand	409		
Independent	Duncan McDonald	312		
Conservative	Mark Conway	98		
Majority		41		

The Highland Council election, 1999: Nairn Cawdor
Party	Candidate	Votes	%	±%
Independent	David Fraser	583		
Independent	Laurie Fraser	513		
Conservative	Jonathan Alford	133		
Independent	John MacKenzie	81		
Majority		70		

The Highland Council election, 1999: Nairn Auldearn
Party	Candidate	Votes	%	±%
Independent	Alexander Park	Unopposed		

The Highland Council election, 1999: Badenoch West
Party	Candidate	Votes	%	±%
Liberal Democrats	Alexander Russell	882		
Conservative	David Spry	251		
Majority		631		

The Highland Council election, 1999: Badenoch East
Party	Candidate	Votes	%	±%
SNP	Robert Severn	351		
Independent	Susan Paton	328		
Liberal Democrats	Gregor Rimell	303		
Independent	George Gibson	159		
Majority		23		

The Highland Council election, 1999: Strathspey South
Party	Candidate	Votes	%	±%
Independent	Angus Gordon	657		
SNP	Karen Lawrie	498		
Majority		159		

The Highland Council election, 1999: Strathspey North-East
Party	Candidate	Votes	%	±%
Liberal Democrats	Francis Black	Unopposed		

The Highland Council election, 1999: Grantown-on-Spey
Party	Candidate	Votes	%	±%
Independent	Basil Dunlop	852		
Independent	Arthur Durance	302		
Majority		550		

The Highland Council election, 1999: Mallaig and Small Isles
Party	Candidate	Votes	%	±%
Independent	Charles King	Unopposed		

The Highland Council election, 1999: Kilmallie and Invergarry
Party	Candidate	Votes	%	±%
Independent	George Bruce	754		
Labour	Susan Carstairs	258		
Independent	Donald Lawrie	166		
Majority		496		

The Highland Council election, 1999: Claggan and Glen Spean
Party	Candidate	Votes	%	±%
Independent	William MacLachlan	Unopposed		

The Highland Council election, 1999: Ardnamurchan and Morvern
Party	Candidate	Votes	%	±%
Liberal Democrats	Michael Foxley	571		
Independent	Iain Thornber	387		
Conservative	Jonathan Slater	197		
Majority		184		

The Highland Council election, 1999: Caol
Party	Candidate	Votes	%	±%
Independent	Olwyn Macdonald	Unopposed		

The Highland Council election, 1999: Fort William North
Party	Candidate	Votes	%	±%
Labour	Brian Murphy	699		
SNP	Iain Macdonald	559		
Majority		140		

The Highland Council election, 1999: Fort William South
Party	Candidate	Votes	%	±%
Independent	Neil Clark	Unopposed		

The Highland Council election, 1999: Glencoe
Party	Candidate	Votes	%	±%
Independent	Andrew McFarlane-Slack	770		
Labour	William Spence	428		
SNP	David Ingham	257		
Majority		342		
