= Stac Levenish =

Sea stack in Scotland

Stac Leibhinis (Gaelic)
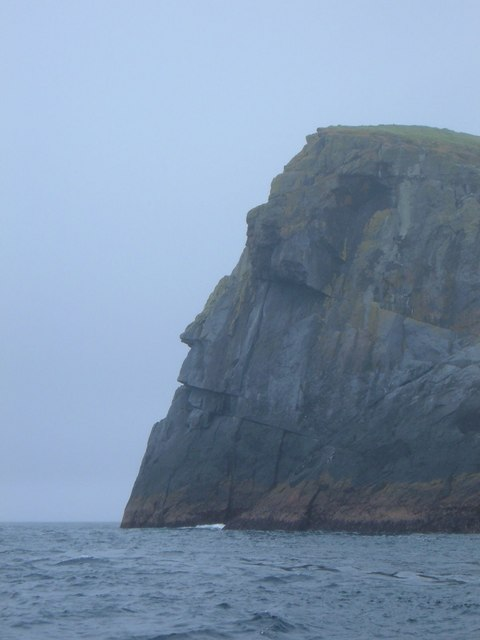
- Stac Levenish cliff's face silhouette

Location
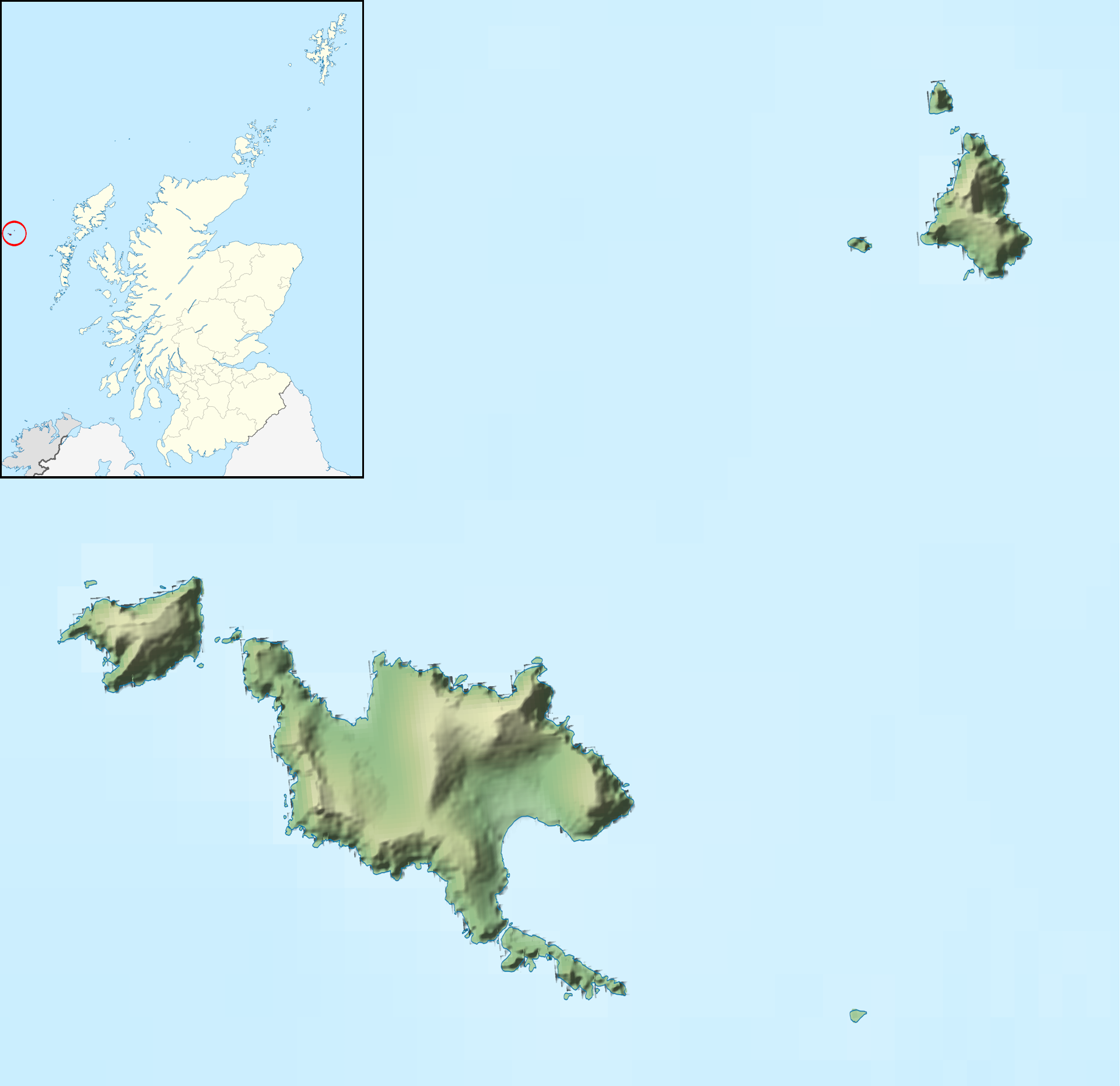
- Stac Levenish shown within St Kilda Stac Levenish shown within the Outer Hebrides
- OS grid reference: NF133966
- Coordinates: 57.792°N 8.510°W

Physical geography
- Island group: St Kilda
- Area: 24,280 m^{2} (261,350 sq ft)
- Highest elevation: 62 m (203 ft)

Administration
- Council area: Outer Hebrides
- Country: Scotland
- Sovereign state: United Kingdom

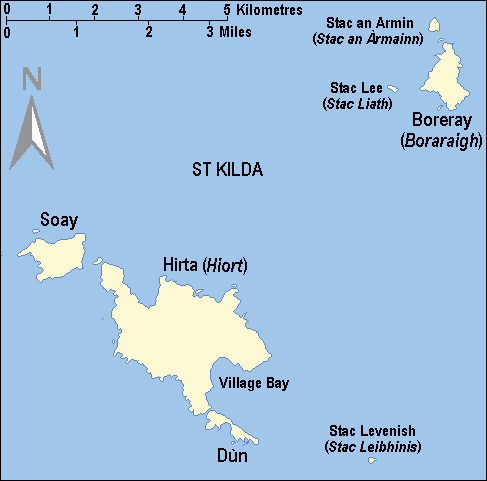
The St Kilda archipelago

Stac Levenish or Stac Leibhinis (sometimes simply called Levenish/Leibhinis) is a sea stack in the St Kilda archipelago in Scotland. Lying 2.5 kilometres (1 1/4 nautical miles) off Village Bay on Hirta, it is part of the rim of an extinct volcano that includes Dùn, Ruaival and Mullach Sgar.

The stack is 62 metres (203 ft) high. Its north cliff appears to have the profile of a human face, visible when travelling to St Kilda from the east. The skerry of Na Bodhan lies to the north east.

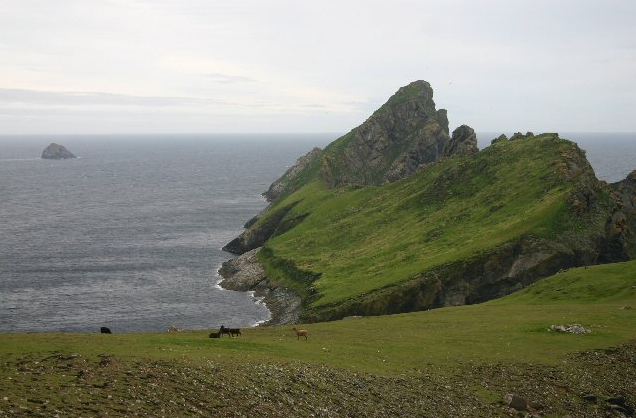
Dùn from Ruaival with Stac Levenish in the background at left.

The stack was climbed recreationally in the early 1900s; Norman Heathcote mentions a moderately difficult ascent in 1900, as part of a climbing expedition that also included an ascent of Stac Lee.

There is another smaller and unnamed rock on Stac Levenish's south-west. It is visible on Google Maps.

== See also ==
- List of outlying islands of Scotland
- Pareidolia
