= Stac an Armin =

Sea stack in the St Kilda archipelago, Scotland

Stac an Àrmainn (Gaelic)
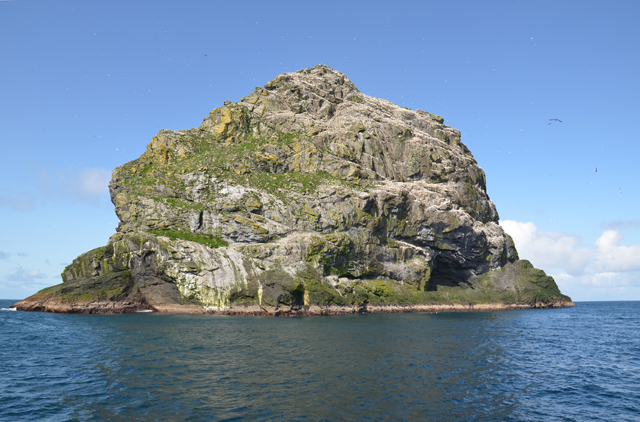

Location
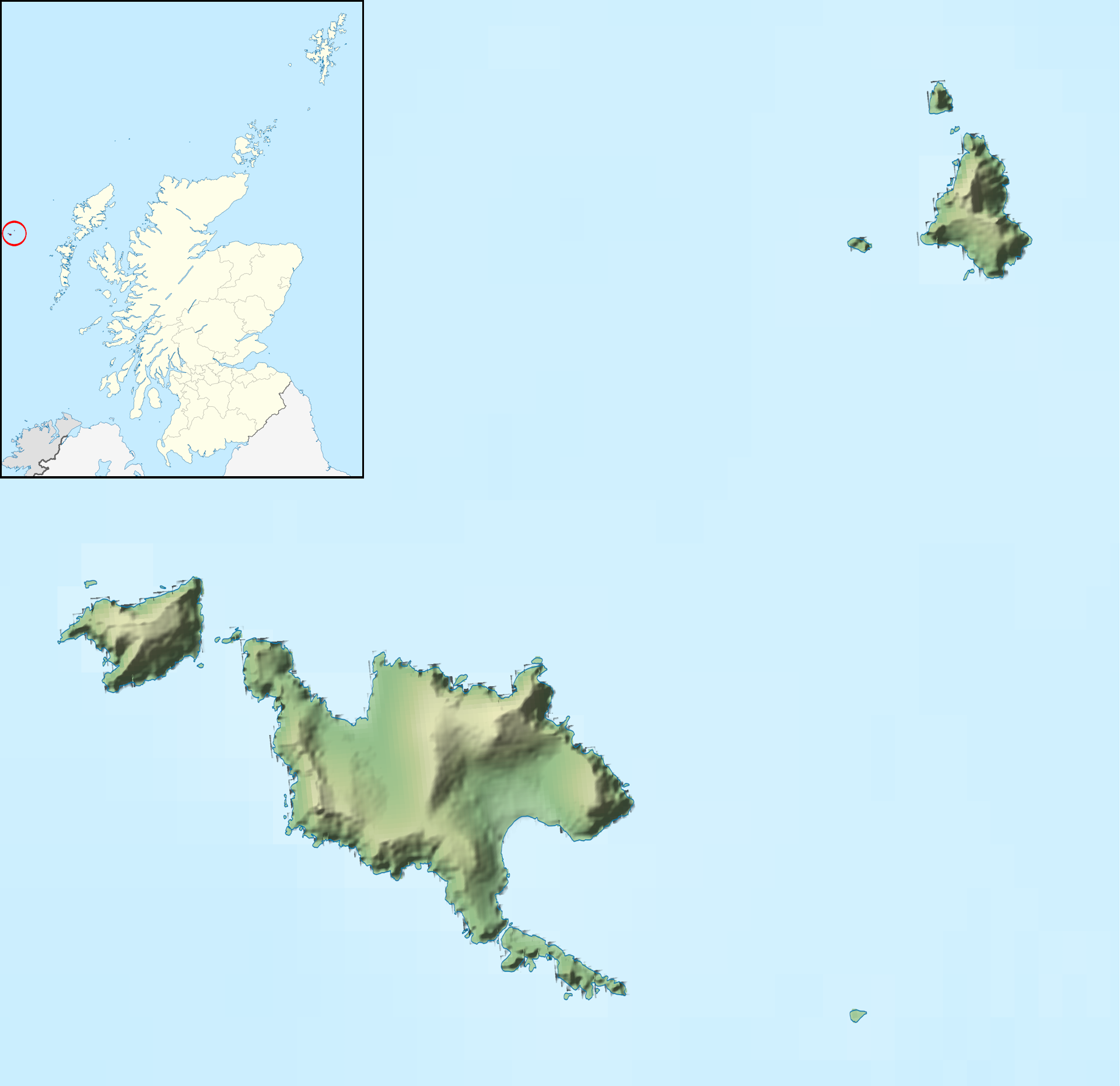
- Stac an Armin shown within St Kilda Stac an Armin shown within the Outer Hebrides
- OS grid reference: NA151064
- Coordinates: 57.88°N 8.49°W

Name
- Name meaning: (Gaelic) "stack of the warrior"

Physical geography
- Island group: St Kilda
- Area: 9.9 ha (24 acres)
- Highest elevation: 196 m (643 ft)

Administration
- Council area: Outer Hebrides
- Country: Scotland
- Sovereign state: United Kingdom

Demographics
- Population: 0

Stac an Armin (Scottish Gaelic: Stac an Àrmainn) is a sea stack in the St Kilda archipelago. It is 196 metres (643 ft) tall, qualifying it as a Marilyn. It is the highest sea stack in Scotland and the British Isles.

The name Stac an Armin means stack of the soldier/warrior, and evidence remains showing it was used by people living nearby as a hunting grounds. It is not believed to have been inhabited year round, but has hosted some (involuntary) extended stays. Climbing the rocks was once done to collect eggs and has continued in the form of recreational sport. The island was once home to the now extinct great auk, and rules exist to protect the bird habitats and breeding grounds.

Stac an Armin is 400 metres (1/4 mi) north of Boreray and near the 172-metre-high (564-foot) Stac Lee. Stac an Armin is separated from Boreray by a channel "so littered with rocks" that it should not be sailed, though sailors write passionately about the views.

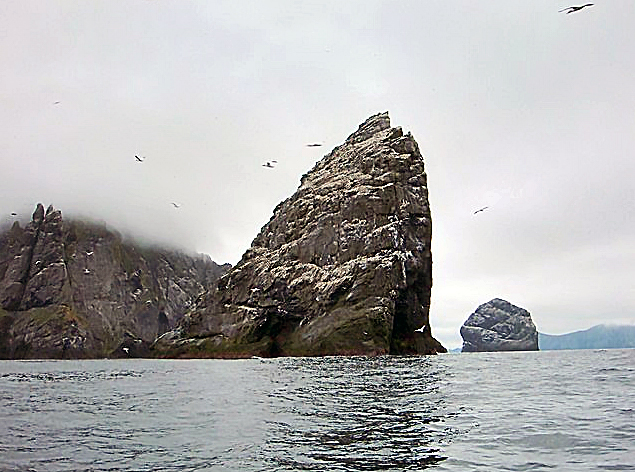
Stac an Armin with Boreray to the left and Stac Lee beyond at right

== Etymology ==
The Gaelic name Stac an Àrmainn means "stack of the warrior" or "stack of the knight". The name is said to commemorate a warrior of Lochlann. There was a saying in Gaelic that meant "There could be no cause for fear on Hirta as they had The Boar to the west and the Warrior to the east." The Boar in this case is An Torc, a small skerry west of the Ruabhal cliffs on Hirta.

== History and people ==
The first written account of the island was Martin Martin's description in the early 18th century. Martin wrote about the island after the Scottish writer had visited St Kilda in 1697 and included a few anecdotes about the stack in his A Description of the Western Isles of Scotland published in 1703. It was the first comprehensive book on the archipelago, to which was appended "A Late Voyage to St Kilda". Martin calls the island "Stack-Narmin."

It was never inhabited full-time, but hunting its bird population helped sustain the way of life of the population of St Kilda, as evidenced by the buildings they left behind. There are no fewer than 78 storage cleitean on Stac an Armin and a small bothy, built by the St Kildans. Martin describes these cleitean as "pyramids" and wrote they were used to "preserve and dry" birds, especially the "solan goose" (northern gannet). Martin observed one harvest that brought in 800 birds. In addition to the geese, the islanders used Stac an Armin for harvesting great auks, gannets, and puffins, as well as their eggs. The numerous birds that lived on the island were an important source of sustenance for the people of St Kilda.

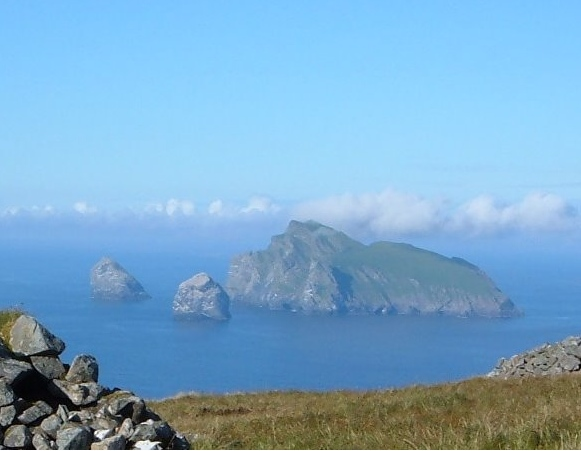
Boreray with Stac an Armin (left) and Stac Lee (right)

The longest recorded period anyone ever spent on the island was about nine months. Three men and eight boys from Hirta were marooned here from about 15 August 1727 until 13 May 1728. As luck would have it, Hirta suffered a smallpox outbreak while the eleven were on the stack, and thus the islanders were unable to man a boat and retrieve them until the next year. Such temporary accidental occupation of the island may have been a regular event, since Martin also relates, in an anecdote in A Description of the Western Islands of Scotland, how a group of some twenty men were stranded on the island for a couple of days after the rope that held their boat broke. They survived by fishing, and communicated to their wives that they were alive and well by lighting "as many fires on the top of an eminence as there were men in number." Martin adds, curiously, that the wives were so overjoyed that they managed to produce a record harvest of corn that year.

The archipelago as a whole was evacuated in 1930, and bequeathed to the National Trust for Scotland in 1957. Hunting birds is no longer allowed, and the stack is visited only occasionally by scientists, journalists and climbers.

== The last great auk in Britain ==
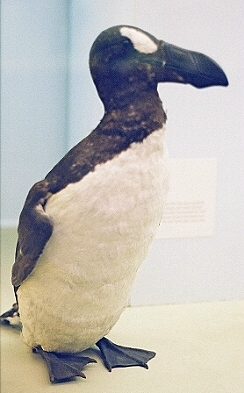
Mounted great auk, Natural History Museum, London

On Stac an Armin, in July, 1840, the last great auk (Pinguinus impennis) seen in Britain was caught and killed. A then 75-year-old inhabitant of St Kilda told Henry Evans, a frequent visitor to the archipelago, that he and his father-in-law with another man had caught a "garefowl," noticing its little wings and the large white spot on its head. They tied it up and kept it alive for three days, and then killed it by beating it with a stick, apparently because they believed it to be a witch. The last known specimens in the world were killed a few years later either in Eldey, Iceland, or off Newfoundland.

== Climbing the stack ==
Native St Kildans have climbed Stac an Armin and other cliffs in St Kilda for centuries in order to harvest birds and eggs; they climbed alpine-style, barefoot or in thick socks, using ropes pleated of horse hair. Modern ascents are few; some may have been done illegally. Mountaindays.net has no routes, information, or comments; however, chatter among online groups suggests attempts are made. The summit of Stac an Armin was reached by a party of 11 Marilyn baggers on 13 October 2014. Prior to that, the only verifiable modern ascent happened in 1969, when a group which included Dick Balharry and John Morton Boyd made a number of ascents in the archipelago, which included climbing Stac an Armin.

Climbing Stac an Armin (and Stac Lee), though attractive ("St Kilda presents some of the most challenging climbing in Britain") is complicated by a number of factors. The climb of Stac an Armin itself is described as "little easier than Stac Lee," but the topography makes it a "major expedition" and "the weather can make nonsense of any landing plans." The stack is accessible only with difficulty; more importantly, since the entire archipelago is both a national nature reserve and a World Heritage Site (principally for the cliffs and seabird colonies) managed by Scottish Natural Heritage (SNH), climbing is strictly regulated since it potentially disturbs the natural and cultural heritage and particularly the rich birdlife; according to the 2003 Management Plan, "For natural heritage interests, natural processes will normally be allowed to continue without intervention."

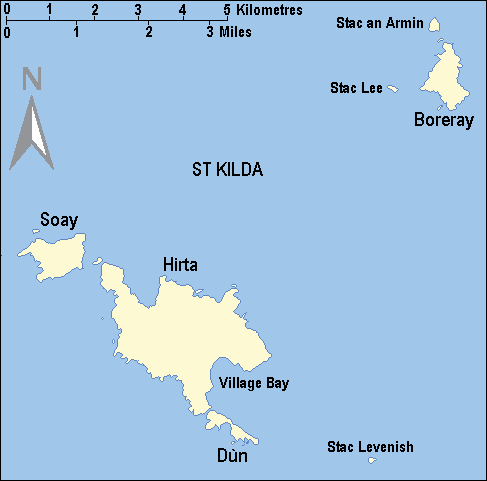
The St Kilda archipelago

The 2003 management plan is quite specific about the dangers of climbing in St Kilda: the object of prescription 21.5 is to "Ensure that breeding seabirds are not disturbed by climbing on the cliffs," though the Plan suggests the allowance of climbing the cliffs under strictly monitored circumstances. Prescription 26.4 states that a policy that satisfies climbers and does not violate the Trust's mission is to be developed. The Trust's strict but preliminary position on climbing was formalised quite explicitly:

Given the difficulty of the climbs, the lack of any rescue or medical facilities on St Kilda and the risk of disturbance to nesting bird on the cliffs, climbing on St Kilda is not permitted without the express permission of the Trust. This is stated formally under the St Kilda Bylaws (No 10). As part of the process of implementing this Management Plan, the Trust will liaise with SNH and the Mountaineering Council of Scotland to review whether any change is merited to this position.

The Mountaineering Council of Scotland, in a review of the plan, "recommends that the NTS celebrate the historical importance and the cultural heritage of the climbing on the Islands of St Kilda."

== See also ==
- List of sea stacks in Scotland
- List of islands of Scotland
- List of outlying islands of Scotland

== Bibliography ==
- Haswell-Smith, Hamish (2004). The Scottish Islands. Edinburgh: Canongate. ISBN 978-1-84195-454-7.
- Quine, David (2000). St Kilda. Grantown-on-Spey: Colin Baxter Island Guides. ISBN 1-84107-008-4.
- Rackwitz, Martin. Travels to Terra Incognita: The Scottish Highlands and Hebrides in Early Modern Travellers' Accounts C. 1600 to 1800. Waxmann Verlag, 2007. ISBN 978-3-8309-1699-4.
