= Stac Lee =

Scottish sea stack

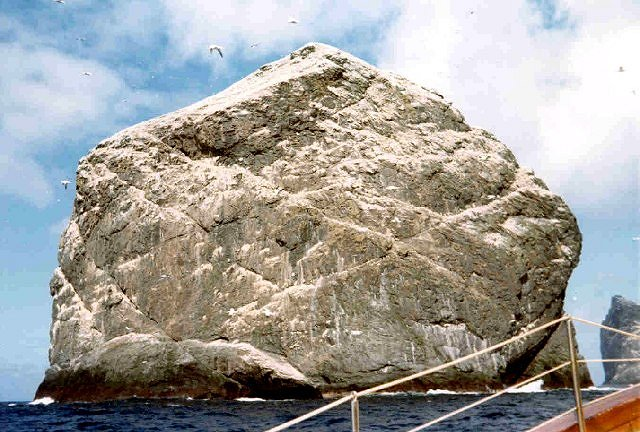
- Stac Lee, St Kilda

Location
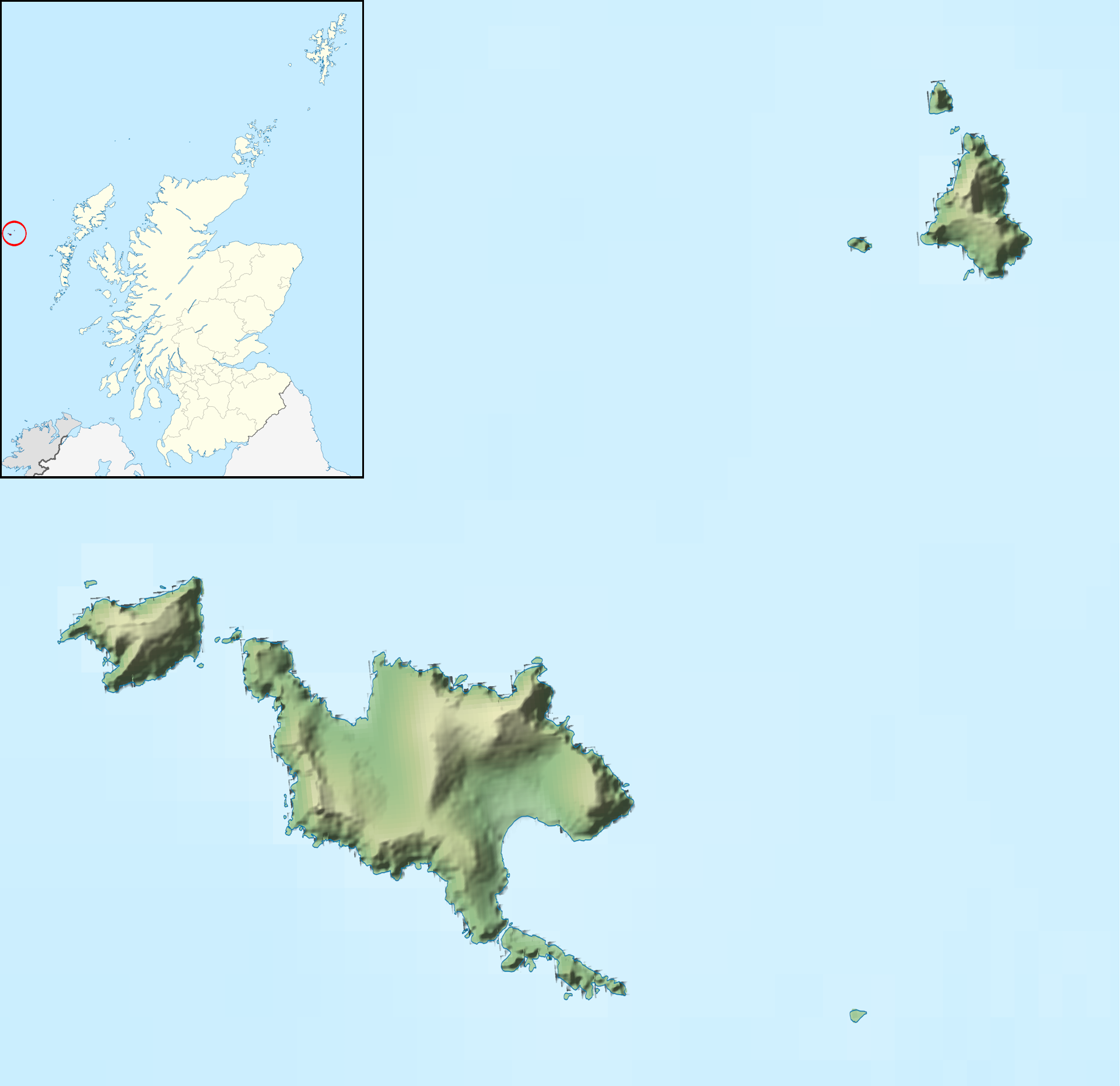
- Stac Lee shown within St Kilda Stac Lee shown within the Outer Hebrides
- OS grid reference: NA142049
- Coordinates: 57.8659°N 8.5097°W

Name
- Name meaning: "ly": shelter

Physical geography
- Island group: St Kilda
- Area: 2.3 ha (6 acres)
- Highest elevation: 172 m (564 ft)

Administration
- Council area: Outer Hebrides
- Country: Scotland
- Sovereign state: United Kingdom

Demographics
- Population: 0

Stac Lee (Scottish Gaelic: Stac Lì) is a sea stack in the St Kilda group off the west coast of Scotland. An island Marilyn (a point with topographic prominence of at least 150 m), it is home to part of the world's largest colony of northern gannet.

Martin Martin called the island "Stac-Ly" in 1698. Other sources call it "Stac Lii."

== Geography and geology ==
Stac Lee is located in the North Atlantic and forms part of the St Kilda archipelago of the Outer Hebrides. Lying in the north east of the St Kilda group, Stac Lee is around 7 kilometres (4 mi) north east of Hirta, the main island, and 550 metres (600 yd) west of the west cape of the island of Boreray.

Administratively, Stac Lee is part of the Na h-Eileanan Siar.

=== Topography and ascents ===
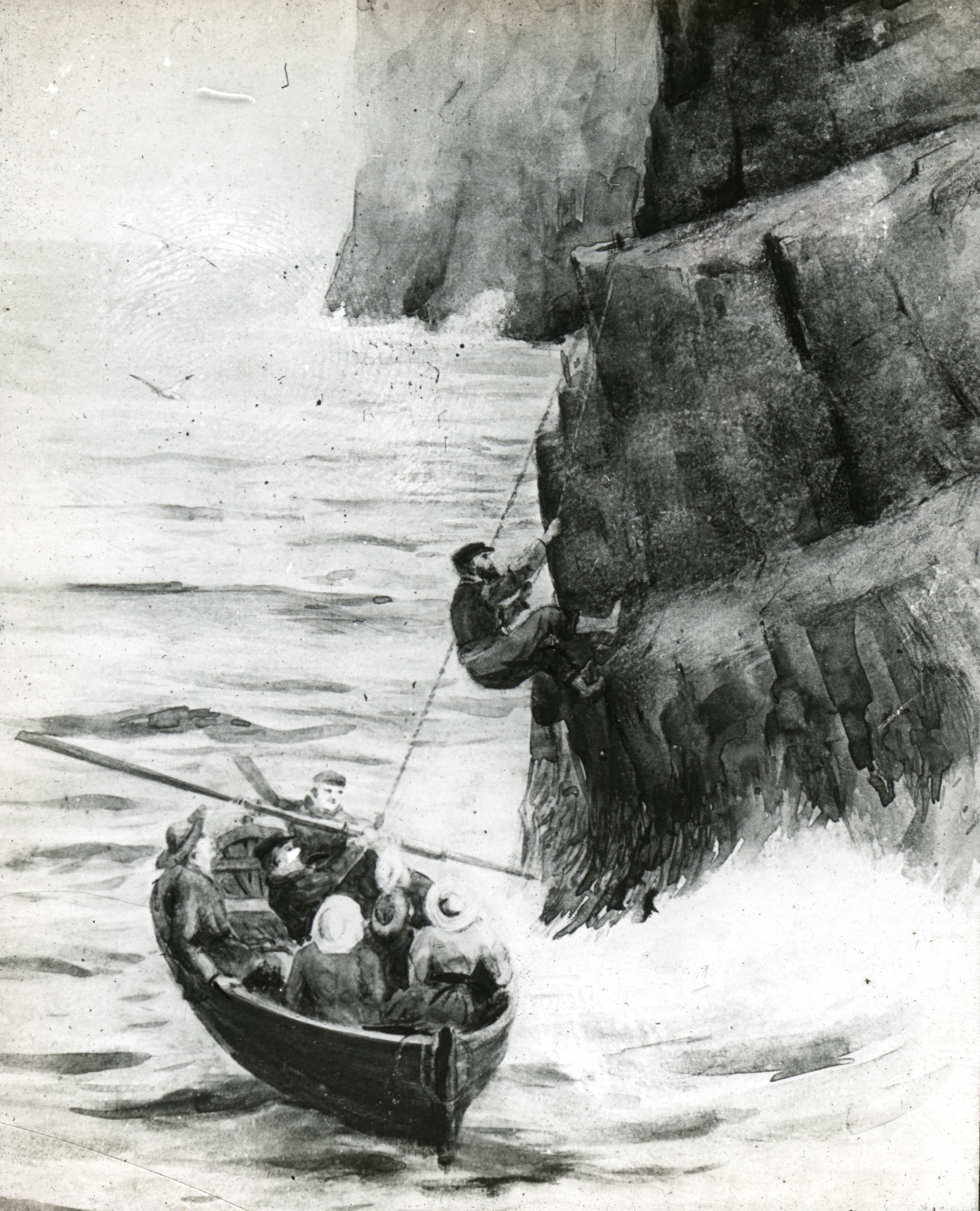
A St Kildan landing on Stac Lee (1901)

Stac Lee is a precipitous sea stack, i.e. a detached escarpment, 172 metres (564 ft) high. Other sources give an altitude of 165 metres (541 ft), or 220 metres (720 ft) above the sea bed. Having a prominence greater than 150 metres (490 ft), it is a Marilyn.

The nearby Stac an Armin reaches 196 metres (643 ft), making these the highest sea stacks in Britain. Seen from the south, the rock appears as an imposing cliff as broad as high, while from the west it has the aspect of a thin needle with a top bevelled at an angle of 45°. The most impressive view is that obtained from the south-east, from where Stac Lee looks like a giant hook.

A small bothy on Stac Lee was formerly used by St Kildan fowlers. It is big enough to accommodate two people and is dry inside. The St Kildans would land here by lassoing an iron peg, and then jumping when the swell rose up.

Along with his sister Evelyn, Norman Heathcote climbed the stack in 1899 and wrote about it in his book St Kilda and in a climbing journal. He said that it was "comparatively easy" to climb although getting ashore onto the stack was "a most appalling undertaking" involving jumping ashore and climbing an overhanging cliff covered in slippery seaweed to a stanchion 20 feet (6.1 m) above sea level.

The stack was climbed in 1969 by conservationists Dick Balharry and John Morton Boyd; then on 31 May 1977 by a party including the islands' then Warden Stuart Murray (who is co-author with Mike P Harris of Birds of St Kilda) and another key researcher of the archipelago, Mary Harman. This visit contributed important visual documentation to the Canmore record for Stac Lee through Murray's photographs. After a gannet census visit on 20 June 1985, Peter Moore, documented the gannet-hunters' bothy in an article for a Scottish Vernacular Buildings Working Group publication.

It was climbed on 21 May 1990 by three National Trust for Scotland wardens. Its summit was reached by six climbers, including Marilyn baggers and supporting rock climbers, on 13 October 2014. There were more ascents in October 2015.

== Wildlife ==
St Kilda has the world's largest colony of northern gannet, with an estimated 60,000 breeding pairs on Boreray, Stac an Armin and Stac Lee. In 2004 about 14,000 occupied nest sites were observed on Stac Lee alone, and this number is thought to have been stable over the previous ten years.

== Gallery ==
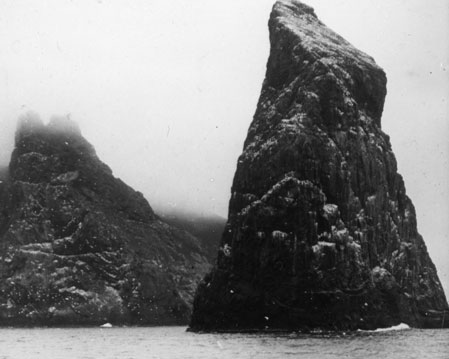
Stac Lee (right) and Boreray

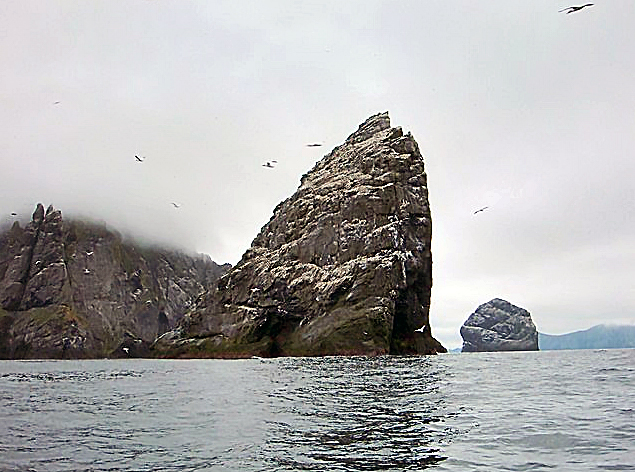
Stac an Àrmainn with Boreray to the left and Stac Lee beyond at right

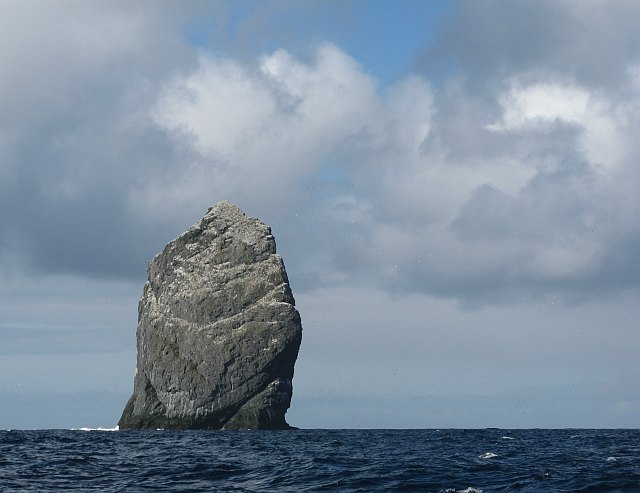
Stac Lee from the south east

== See also ==
- List of sea stacks in Scotland
- List of islands of Scotland
- List of outlying islands of Scotland
