= 2003 Highland Council election =

2003 Scottish local government election

← 1999	1 May 2003	2007 →

All 80 seats to Highland Council 41 seats needed for a majority

	First party	Second party
Party	Independent	Liberal Democrats
Last election	49 seats, 57.4%	12 seats, 10.6%
Seats won	57	9
Seat change	▲8	▼3
Popular vote	45,405	3,986
Percentage	69.6%	6.1%
Swing	▲12.2%	▼4.5%
	Third party	Fourth party
Party	Labour	SNP
Last election	10 seats, 15.4%	8 seats, 12.4%
Seats won	8	6
Seat change	▼2	▼2
Popular vote	7,536	6,664
Percentage	11.6%	10.2%
Swing	▼3.8%	▼2.2%
- Map showing results by ward
Council Convener before election
David Green
Independent
Council Convener after election
Alison Magee
Independent

The 2003 Highland Council election was held on 1 May 2003; the same day as elections to the Scottish Parliament and to the 31 other councils in Scotland. 80 councillors were elected from 80 wards using the plurality system (a.k.a. 'First Past the Post'). Independent councillors retained their status as the majority group, with councillors also being elected representing the Labour Party, Liberal Democrats, and Scottish National Party.

== Results ==
2003 Highland Council election result
Party	Seats	Gains	Losses	Net gain/loss	Seats %	Votes %	Votes	+/−
Independent	57	11	4	▲8	71.3	69.6	45,405	▲12.2
Liberal Democrats	9	2	5	▼3	11.3	6.1	3,986	▼4.5
Labour	8	3	5	▼2	10.0	11.6	7,536	▼3.8
SNP	6	1	3	▼2	7.5	10.2	6,664	▼2.2
Conservative	0	0	0	Steady	0.0	1.2	799	▼2.1
Scottish Socialist	0	0	0	Steady	0.0	1.1	730	New
Countryside	0	0	0	Steady	0.0	0.2	116	New

== Caithness ==
The Highland Council election, 2003: Caithness North-West
Party	Candidate	Votes	%	±%
Liberal Democrats	Alastair MacDonald	Unopposed		

The Highland Council election, 2003: Thurso West
Party	Candidate	Votes	%	±%
Labour	Eric Saxon	543		
Independent	James Fry	425		
Majority		118		

The Highland Council election, 2003: Thurso Central
Party	Candidate	Votes	%	±%
Independent	Donald Mackay	636		
Labour	John Rosie	527		
Majority		109		

The Highland Council election, 2003: Thurso East
Party	Candidate	Votes	%	±%
Independent	Tom Jackson	Unopposed		

The Highland Council election, 2003: Caithness Central
Party	Candidate	Votes	%	±%
Liberal Democrats	David Flear	Unopposed		

The Highland Council election, 2003: Caithness North-East
Party	Candidate	Votes	%	±%
Independent	John Green	Unopposed		

The Highland Council election, 2003: Wick
Party	Candidate	Votes	%	±%
Liberal Democrats	Graeme Smith	536		
Labour	Bill Mowat	242		
SNP	Niall Smith	198		
Majority		294		

The Highland Council election, 2003: Wick West
Party	Candidate	Votes	%	±%
Independent	William Fernie	469		
SNP	James Sutherland	355		
Labour	Neil MacDonald	225		
Majority		114		

The Highland Council election, 2003: Pulteneytown
Party	Candidate	Votes	%	±%
Independent	Katrina MacNab	599		
Labour	Jim Oag	301		
Majority		298		

The Highland Council election, 2003: Caithness South-East
Party	Candidate	Votes	%	±%
Independent	William Mowat	Unopposed		

== Sutherland ==
The Highland Council election, 2003: Sutherland North-West
Party	Candidate	Votes	%	±%
Independent	Francis Keith	519		
Independent	John Forbes	442		
Majority		77		

The Highland Council election, 2003: Tongue and Farr
Party	Candidate	Votes	%	±%
Independent	Sandy Mackay	518		
Liberal Democrats	Barbara Jardine	376		
Majority		142		

The Highland Council election, 2003: Sutherland Central
Party	Candidate	Votes	%	±%
Independent	Alison Magee	Unopposed		

The Highland Council election, 2003: Golspie and Rogart
Party	Candidate	Votes	%	±%
Independent	Ian Ross	912		
Scottish Socialist	Francis Ward	79		
Majority		833		

The Highland Council election, 2003: Brora
Party	Candidate	Votes	%	±%
Independent	Rita Finlayson	634		
Independent	Robbie Rowantree	602		
Majority		32		

The Highland Council election, 2003: Dornoch Firth
Party	Candidate	Votes	%	±%
Independent	Duncan Allan	826		
Independent	Gordon Campbell	339		
Majority		487		

== Ross & Cromarty ==
The Highland Council election, 2003: Lochbroom
Party	Candidate	Votes	%	±%
SNP	Jean Urquhart	393		
Independent	Kenneth MacLeod	338		
Labour	Lauri Chilton	239		
Majority		55		

The Highland Council election, 2003: Alness and Ardross
Party	Candidate	Votes	%	±%
SNP	Andrew Anderson	961		
Scottish Socialist	Jean Cadden	88		
Majority		873		

The Highland Council election, 2003: Tain West
Party	Candidate	Votes	%	±%
Independent	Alasdair Rhind	1,025		
Scottish Socialist	Sean Robertson	162		
Majority		863		

The Highland Council election, 2003: Tain East
Party	Candidate	Votes	%	±%
Independent	Alan Torrance	540		
Independent	James Paterson	497		
Majority		43		

The Highland Council election, 2003: Seaboard
Party	Candidate	Votes	%	±%
Independent	Richard Durham	554		
Independent	Linda Bruce	232		
SNP	Andrew Currie	232		
Majority		322		

The Highland Council election, 2003: Invergordon
Party	Candidate	Votes	%	±%
Independent	John Connell	662		
Independent	Maxine Smith	251		
Labour	Lou Wilkerson	203		
Majority		411		

The Highland Council election, 2003: Rosskeen and Saltburn
Party	Candidate	Votes	%	±%
Independent	Carolyn Wilson	900		
Independent	Dot MacLennan	292		
Majority		608		

The Highland Council election, 2003: Gairloch
Party	Candidate	Votes	%	±%
Independent	Roy Macintyre	601		
Labour Co-op	Christine Conniff	351		
Majority		250		

The Highland Council election, 2003: Lochcarron
Party	Candidate	Votes	%	±%
Independent	Ewan Mackinnon	746		
Countryside	Neveille-Suzanette MacDonald-Rolfe	116		
Majority		630		

The Highland Council election, 2003: Ferindonald
Party	Candidate	Votes	%	±%
Independent	Val MacIver	531		
Independent	Mike Finlayson	492		
Independent	Dennis Dunbar	173		
Majority		39		

The Highland Council election, 2003: Strathpeffer and Strathconon
Party	Candidate	Votes	%	±%
Independent	Douglas Briggs	812		
Conservative	John Scott	219		
Majority		593		

The Highland Council election, 2003: Dingwall South
Party	Candidate	Votes	%	±%
SNP	Margaret Paterson	470		
Labour	Marilyn Ross	439		
Majority		31		

The Highland Council election, 2003: Dingwall North
Party	Candidate	Votes	%	±%
Labour	Michael MacMillan	576		
Independent	Andrew Paterson	532		
Majority		44		

The Highland Council election, 2003: Muir of Ord
Party	Candidate	Votes	%	±%
Independent	David Chisholm	806		
Independent	Tom Davis	380		
Majority		426		

The Highland Council election, 2003: Conon and Maryburgh
Party	Candidate	Votes	%	±%
Liberal Democrats	Angela MacLean	786		
Independent	David Philip	519		
Majority		267		

The Highland Council election, 2003: Knockbain and Killearnan
Party	Candidate	Votes	%	±%
Independent	Isobel McCallum	980		
Conservative	Andrew Duncan	226		
Majority		754		

The Highland Council election, 2003: Black Isle North
Party	Candidate	Votes	%	±%
Independent	David Alston	Unopposed		

The Highland Council election, 2003: Avoch and Fortrose
Party	Candidate	Votes	%	±%
Independent	Billy Barclay	598		
Independent	Okain McLennan	584		
Independent	Morris Downie	496		
Labour	Leslie Hood	136		
Majority		14		

== Skye & Lochalsh ==
The Highland Council election, 2003: Snizort and Trotternish
Party	Candidate	Votes	%	±%
Independent	Iain MacDonald	547		
SNP	Rod Liddon	306		
Independent	Ben Palmer	87		
Majority		241		

The Highland Council election, 2003: Skye West
Party	Candidate	Votes	%	±%
Independent	John Laing	538		
Independent	William Sutherland	330		
Majority		208		

The Highland Council election, 2003: Portree
Party	Candidate	Votes	%	±%
Liberal Democrats	Drew Millar	Unopposed		

The Highland Council election, 2003: Skye Central
Party	Candidate	Votes	%	±%
Independent	Hamish Fraser	Unopposed		

The Highland Council election, 2003: Kyle and Sleat
Party	Candidate	Votes	%	±%
Independent	William Fulton	529		
Independent	Audrey Sinclair	450		
Majority		79		

The Highland Council election, 2003: Kinlochshiel
Party	Candidate	Votes	%	±%
Liberal Democrats	Isabelle Campbell	Unopposed		

== Inverness ==
The Highland Council election, 2003: Beauly and Strathglass
Party	Candidate	Votes	%	±%
Independent	Garry Coutts	555		
Independent	Helen Carmichael	549		
Majority		6		

The Highland Council election, 2003: Kirkhill
Party	Candidate	Votes	%	±%
Independent	Jack Shiels	572		
Independent	Graham Cross	407		
Independent	Hamish Wood	312		
Majority		165		

The Highland Council election, 2003: Scorguie
Party	Candidate	Votes	%	±%
Independent	Jimmy MacDonald	452		
Liberal Democrats	Shanea Fraser	227		
Independent	Christine Forbes	195		
Labour	Mark Grant	179		
Majority		225		

The Highland Council election, 2003: Muirtown
Party	Candidate	Votes	%	±%
Labour	Christine Cumming	Unopposed		

The Highland Council election, 2003: Merkinch
Party	Candidate	Votes	%	±%
Independent	Peter Corbett	642		
Scottish Socialist	Simon Cann	92		
Majority		550		

The Highland Council election, 2003: Inverness Central
Party	Candidate	Votes	%	±%
Labour	Eilidh MacDonald	319		
Independent	Jim Alexander	316		
Liberal Democrats	Daniel Farthing	174		
Independent	Hector MacDonald	170		
Independent	Donald MacKay	116		
Majority		3		

The Highland Council election, 2003: Culloden
Party	Candidate	Votes	%	±%
Labour	John Ford	434		
SNP	James McCreath	377		
Liberal Democrats	Michael Perrin	187		
Majority		57		

The Highland Council election, 2003: Ardersier, Croy, and Petty
Party	Candidate	Votes	%	±%
Independent	Roderick Balfour	Unopposed		

The Highland Council election, 2003: Loch Ness West
Party	Candidate	Votes	%	±%
Independent	Margaret Davidson	Unopposed		

The Highland Council election, 2003: Inverness West
Party	Candidate	Votes	%	±%
Independent	Ronald Lyon	546		
Independent	Joan Stewart	280		
Majority		266		

The Highland Council election, 2003: Canal
Party	Candidate	Votes	%	±%
Independent	William Smith	Unopposed		

The Highland Council election, 2003: Ballifeary
Party	Candidate	Votes	%	±%
Independent	Alistair Milne	625		
Labour	Jim Thomson	465		
Majority		160		

The Highland Council election, 2003: Lochardil
Party	Candidate	Votes	%	±%
Independent	Margaret MacLennan	712		
Independent	Michael Gimson	377		
Labour	Andrew Ingram	211		
Majority		335		

The Highland Council election, 2003: Hilton
Party	Candidate	Votes	%	±%
Liberal Democrats	Angus Dick	547		
Independent	Thomas Lamont	368		
Majority		179		

The Highland Council election, 2003: Milton
Party	Candidate	Votes	%	±%
Labour	Clive Goodman	494		
SNP	Ian Brown	429		
Liberal Democrats	Ruth Hunt	199		
Majority		65		

The Highland Council election, 2003: Crown
Party	Candidate	Votes	%	±%
Labour	James Gray	734		
Independent	Hamish McKenzie	622		
Majority		112		

The Highland Council election, 2003: Raigmore
Party	Candidate	Votes	%	±%
Labour	David Munro	521		
SNP	Scott MacKenzie	217		
Independent	Donald Robertson	89		
Independent	David Gallant	81		
Majority		304		

The Highland Council election, 2003: Loch Ness East
Party	Candidate	Votes	%	±%
Independent	Ella MacRae	Unopposed		

The Highland Council election, 2003: Culduthel
Party	Candidate	Votes	%	±%
Independent	Norrie Donald	1,061		
Independent	Ralph Sauer	245		
Majority		816		

The Highland Council election, 2003: Inshes
Party	Candidate	Votes	%	±%
Independent	Janet Home	746		
Independent	John Holden	540		
Majority		206		

The Highland Council election, 2003: Drumossie
Party	Candidate	Votes	%	±%
Independent	Kathleen Matheson	754		
Independent	Farquhar Forbes	482		
Majority		272		

The Highland Council election, 2003: Westhill and Smithton
Party	Candidate	Votes	%	±%
SNP	Gillian McCreath	461		
Labour	Malcolm Jack	397		
Conservative	Peter Saggers	152		
Independent	George Davidson	107		
Majority		64		

The Highland Council election, 2003: Balloch
Party	Candidate	Votes	%	±%
SNP	Robert Wynd	647		
Liberal Democrats	Glynis Sinclair	409		
Conservative	Tony Lister	202		
Majority		238		

== Nairn ==
The Highland Council election, 2003: Nairn Alltan
Party	Candidate	Votes	%	±%
Independent	John Matheson	363		
Independent	Jim Lennon	300		
Independent	Bill Shand	297		
SNP	June Gordon	217		
Independent	Nigel Hanlin	53		
Majority		63		

The Highland Council election, 2003: Nairn Ninian
Party	Candidate	Votes	%	±%
SNP	Elizabeth MacDonald	606		
Independent	Andrew Brown	330		
Independent	Duncan McDonald	310		
Majority		276		

The Highland Council election, 2003: Nairn Cawdor
Party	Candidate	Votes	%	±%
Independent	Laurie Fraser	766		
Independent	Graham Marsden	242		
Majority		524		

The Highland Council election, 2003: Nairn Auldearn
Party	Candidate	Votes	%	±%
Independent	Alexander Park	837		
Independent	James Young	394		
Majority		443		

== Badenoch & Strathspey ==
The Highland Council election, 2003: Badenoch West
Party	Candidate	Votes	%	±%
Independent	Sheena Slimon	Unopposed		

The Highland Council election, 2003: Badenoch East
Party	Candidate	Votes	%	±%
Independent	Gregor Rimell	348		
SNP	Robert Severn	309		
Independent	Hendy Pollock	285		
Majority		39		

The Highland Council election, 2003: Strathspey South
Party	Candidate	Votes	%	±%
Independent	Angus Gordon	Unopposed		

The Highland Council election, 2003: Strathspey North-East
Party	Candidate	Votes	%	±%
Liberal Democrats	Francis Black	Unopposed		

The Highland Council election, 2003: Grantown-on-Spey
Party	Candidate	Votes	%	±%
Independent	Basil Dunlop	Unopposed		

== Lochaber ==
The Highland Council election, 2003: Mallaig and Small Isles
Party	Candidate	Votes	%	±%
Independent	Charles King	Unopposed		

The Highland Council election, 2003: Kilmallie and Invergarry
Party	Candidate	Votes	%	±%
Independent	Bill Clark	582		
Independent	George Bruce	411		
Majority		171		

The Highland Council election, 2003: Claggan and Glen Spean
Party	Candidate	Votes	%	±%
Independent	Thomas MacLennan	449		
Independent	William MacLachlan	325		
Independent	Alistair MacGregor	168		
Majority		124		

The Highland Council election, 2003: Ardnamurchan and Morvern
Party	Candidate	Votes	%	±%
Liberal Democrats	Michael Foxley	545		
Independent	Iain Thornber	468		
Majority		77		

The Highland Council election, 2003: Caol
Party	Candidate	Votes	%	±%
Independent	Olwyn Macdonald	656		
Independent	Edward Hunter	627		
Majority		29		

The Highland Council election, 2003: Fort William North
Party	Candidate	Votes	%	±%
Independent	Brian Murphy	733		
Scottish Socialist	Douglas Nolan	309		
Majority		424		

The Highland Council election, 2003: Fort William South
Party	Candidate	Votes	%	±%
Independent	Neil Clark	450		
Independent	May Alexander	238		
Independent	Euan Harper	187		
Majority		212		

The Highland Council election, 2003: Glencoe
Party	Candidate	Votes	%	±%
Independent	Andrew McFarlane-Slack	722		
SNP	David Ingham	486		
Majority		236		
