= Basil Dunlop =

Retired chartered forester

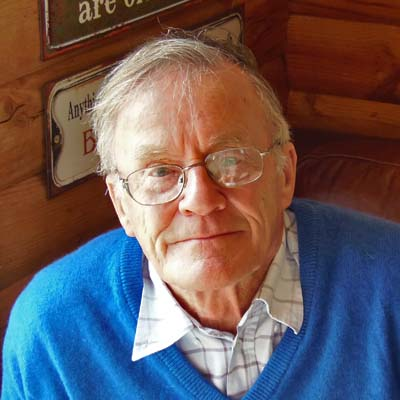
Basil Dunlop, Chartered Forester

Basil Matthew Stuart Dunlop is a retired Chartered Forester, FICFor (Fellow of the Institute of Chartered Foresters) and author who lives in the Cairngorms National Park.

He was the Chief Forester of the Seafield (Strathspey) Estates, which included the Abernethy Forest, from 1965 to 1983 when he started Forest Conservation Services (a forestry consulting business). He has written widely on the subject of Pinewood Conservation including contributions to the journals of the Royal Scottish Forestry Society and the Native Woodland Discussion Group.

Recognised as a Pinewoods expert, in 1988 he was commissioned by the RSPB to write 'The Future Management of the Abernethy Forest Estate as a Nature Reserve' when they purchased the estate.

== Other activities ==
His other activities include being a member of Highland Regional Council from 1988 to 1996. Elected Highland Councillor from 1996 to 2007. Since then he has also been the Highland Council representative of the Council of the National Trust for Scotland from 1996 to 2002, and a board member of the Cairngorms National Park Authority from 2003 to 2007.

In 2002 he formed, and was the first Chairman of, the Anagach Woods Steering Group becoming Director (Chairman 2002-10) Anagach Woods Trust 2002 to present.

== Private Commissions ==
- The Future Management of the Abernethy Forest Estate as a Nature Reserve, Royal Society for the Protection of Birds, 1988

== Publications ==
- The Regeneration of our Native Pinewoods, Royal Scottish Forestry Society, Scottish Forestry (Vol 29, No 2), 1975
- The natural regeneration of Scots pine, Royal Scottish Forestry Society, Scottish Forestry, 1983
- Pressures on the forests of the Cairngorms, in Caring for the High Mountains : Conservation of the Cairngorms, [Editors : J Conroy, Adam Watson, A Gunson], Centre for Scottish Studies, 1990
- Native Woodlands of Strathspey : Research, Survey and Monitoring Report, No33, Scottish Natural Heritage, 1994
- The native woodlands of Strathspey, in Our Pinewood Heritage, [Editor : J Aldhous], (Forestry Commission, Royal Society for the Protection of Birds, Scottish Natural Heritage), 1995
- The Woods of Strathspey in the Nineteenth and Twentieth Centuries, in Scottish Woodland History, [Edited : T C Smout], Scottish Cultural Press, 1997
