= Dùn =

Island of St Kilda, Outer Hebrides, Scotland, UK

Coordinates: 57.79463°N 8.55296°W

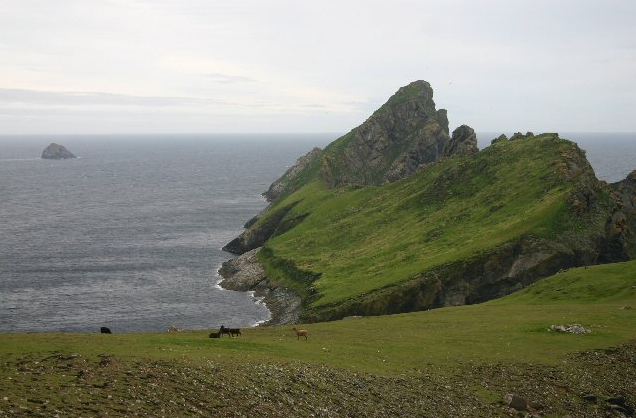
Dùn from Ruaival with Stac Levenish in the background at left.

Dùn is an island in St Kilda, Scotland. It is nearly 1 mile (1.6 kilometres) long. Its name simply means "fort" in Scottish Gaelic (for more information, see "dun"), but the fort itself has been lost – old maps show it on Gob an Dùin (NF109972), which is at the seaward end.

Though Dùn is almost joined to Hirta at Ruiaval, the two islands are separated by Caolas an Dùin (the straits of Dùn). This prevents Soay sheep from Hirta straying onto the island, and thus it is more vegetated.

The small island is home to the largest colony of fulmars in Britain. Before 1828, St Kilda was their only British Isles breeding ground, but they have since spread and established colonies elsewhere, such as at Fowlsheugh. Dùn is a World Heritage site for cultural and natural qualities as one of five Islands that make up five remote Islands, known as St. Kilda.

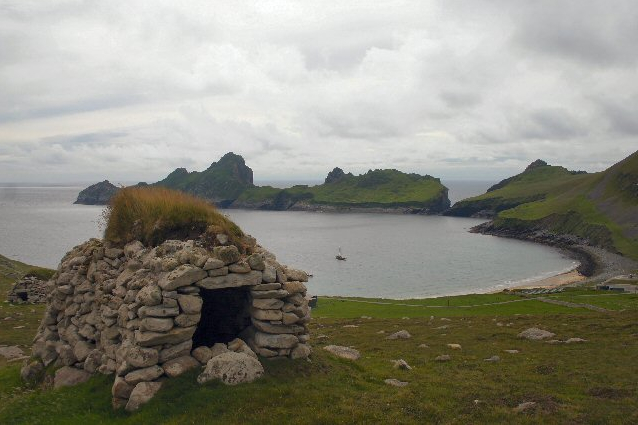
A cleit above Village Bay, Hirta. Dùn can be seen in the background

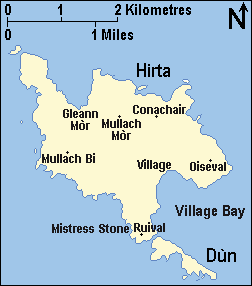
Map showing Dùn and Hirta

Dùn, which protects Village Bay on Hirta from the prevailing south-westerly winds, was at one time joined to Hirta by a natural arch. MacLean (1972) suggests that the arch was broken when struck by a galleon fleeing the defeat of the Armada, but other sources, such as Mitchell (1992), provide the more credible (if less romantic) explanation that the arch was simply swept away by one of the many fierce storms which batter the islands every winter.

== See also ==
- Cleit - a unique St Kildan form of stone shelter
- List of outlying islands of Scotland
