= Boreray, St Kilda =

Island in St Kilda archipelago, Scotland

Boreray
Boraraigh (Gaelic); Boreray (Scots)
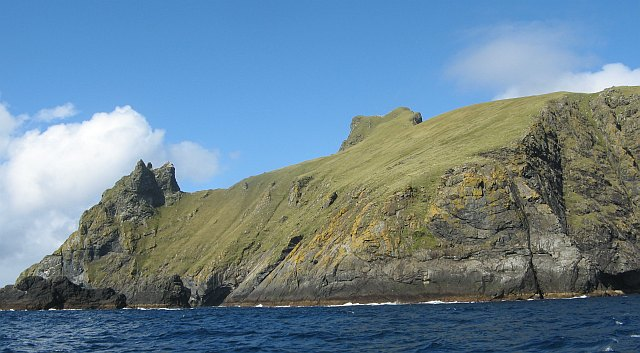

Location
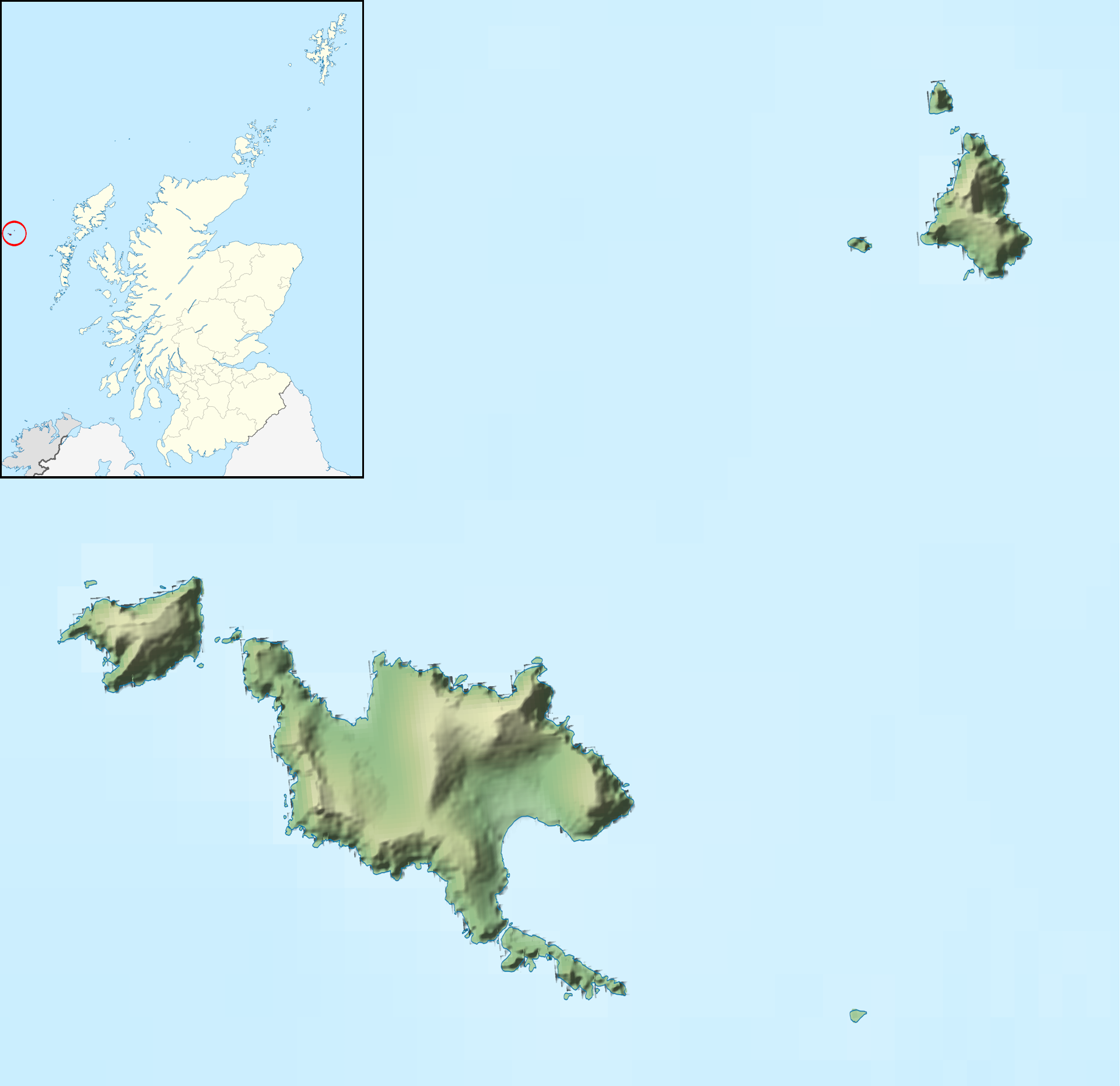
- Boreray shown within St Kilda Boreray shown within the Outer Hebrides
- OS grid reference: NA153053
- Coordinates: 57.87°N 8.5°W

Name
- Gaelic pronunciation: [ˈpɔɾəɾaj]
- Name meaning: "Fort island", from Norse

Physical geography
- Island group: St Kilda
- Area: 86 ha (11/32 sq mi)
- Area rank: 155=
- Highest elevation: Mullach an Eilein 384 m (1,260 ft)

Administration
- Council area: Na h-Eileanan Siar
- Country: Scotland
- Sovereign state: United Kingdom

Demographics
- Population: 0
- Population rank: 0

Boreray (Scottish Gaelic: Boraraigh; Scots: Boreray) is an uninhabited island in the St Kilda archipelago in the North Atlantic.

== Geography ==
Boreray lies about 66 kilometres (41 miles) west-northwest of North Uist. It covers about 77 hectares (5/16 sq mi), and reaches a height of 384 metres (1,260 ft) at Mullach an Eilein.

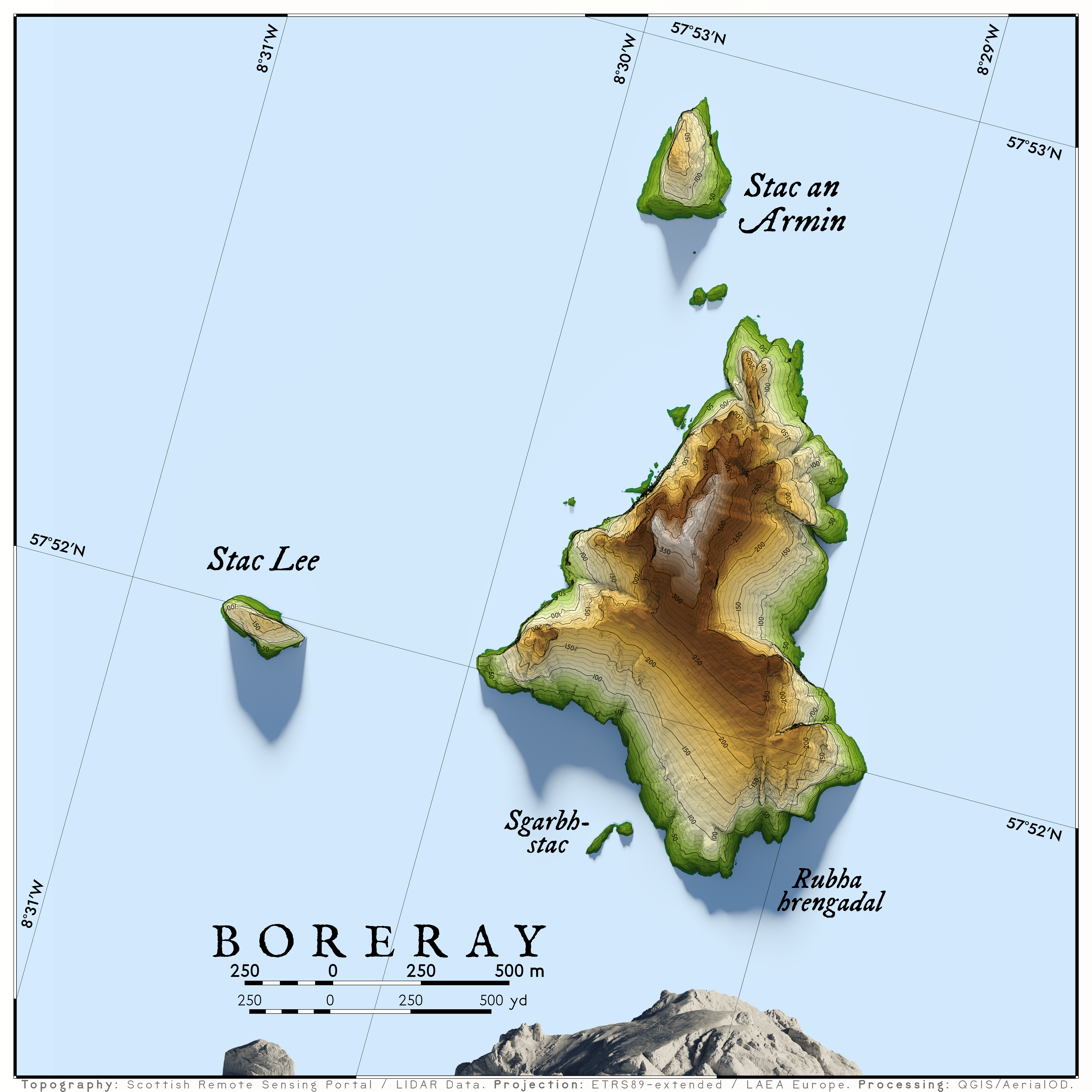
Topographic map of Boreray

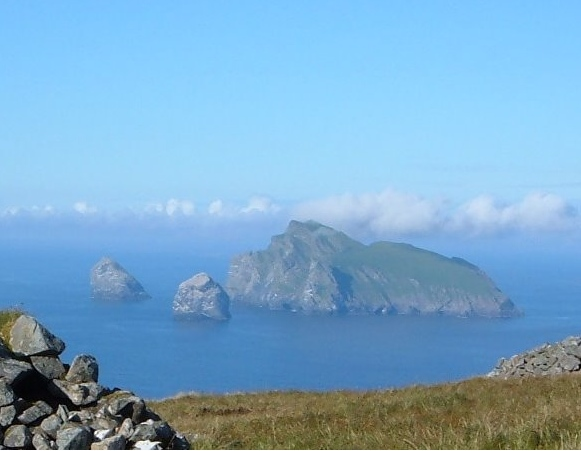
Boreray with Stac an Armin (left) and Stac Lee (right)

Mullach an Eilein

Highest point
- Elevation: 384 m (1,260 ft)
- Prominence: 384 m (1,260 ft)
- Listing: Marilyn
- Coordinates: 57°52′11″N 08°29′26″W

Naming
- English translation: Top/upper part of the island
- Language of name: Scottish Gaelic
- Pronunciation: Scottish Gaelic: [ˈmul̪ˠəx ən̪ˠ ˈjeʎɛɲ]

Geography
- Location: St Kilda, Scotland
- OS grid: NA153053
- Topo map: OS Landranger 18

Boreray is formed of a breccia of gabbro and dolerites.

There are two sea stacks, vertical pillars of rock, just off Boreray. Stac An Armin, 400 metres (1/4 mile) to the north, is the taller at 196 metres (643 ft) high, while Stac Lee, 600 m (660 yards) to the west, is 172 metres (564 ft) high.

Boreray is the smallest of the Scottish islands to have a summit over 1,000 feet (300 metres).

== History ==
Boreray has the Cleitean MacPhàidein, a "cleit village" of three small bothies used regularly during fowling expeditions from Hirta. As a result of a smallpox outbreak on Hirta in 1727, three men and eight boys were marooned on Stac an Armin off the coast of Boreray until the following May.

There are also ruins of Taigh Stallar (the steward's house). The local tradition was that it was built by the "Man of the Rocks", who led a rebellion against the landlord's steward. It may be an example of an Iron Age wheelhouse and the associated remains of an agricultural field system and two additional possible settlement mounds were discovered in 2011. RCAHMS surveyor Ian Parker said:

“This new discovery shows that a farming community actually lived on Boreray, perhaps as long ago as the prehistoric period. The agricultural remains and settlement mounds give us a tantalising glimpse into the lives of those early inhabitants. Farming what is probably one of the most remote – and inhospitable – islands in the North Atlantic would have been a hard and gruelling existence. And given the island’s unfeasibly steep slopes, it’s amazing that they even tried living there in the first place.”

Macauley (1764) reported the existence of five druidic altars in the islands including a large circle of stones fixed perpendicularly in the ground, by the Stallar House.

The islands were bought in 1931 by the ornithologist John Crichton-Stuart, 5th Marquess of Bute. In 1957, following his death, they were bequeathed to the National Trust for Scotland (NTS), the current owner.

St Kilda was inscribed by UNESCO as a World Heritage Site in 1986 in recognition of its Natural Heritage; for its exceptional natural beauty and for the significant natural habitats that it supports. In July 2004 this was extended to include the surrounding marine environment. In July 2005 further recognition for the islands cultural heritage was awarded making it one of only a few places in the world with Dual World Heritage Status for both its natural and cultural significance.

== Gallery ==
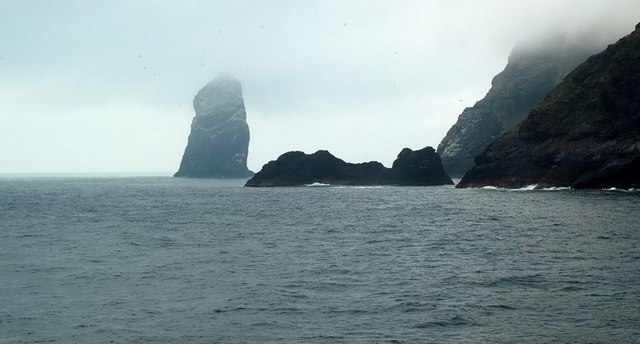
The island of Sgarbhstac and the rocky point of Gob Scapanais

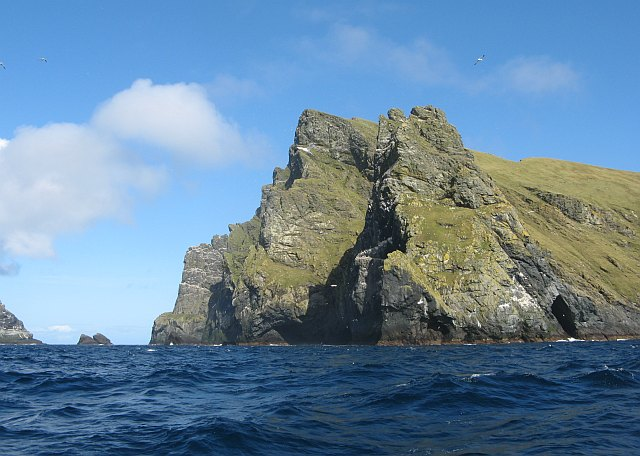
Boreray from the south west

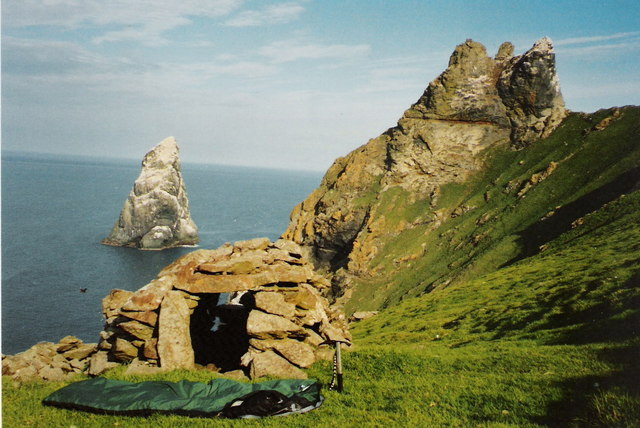
Cleitein McPhaidein, Boreray

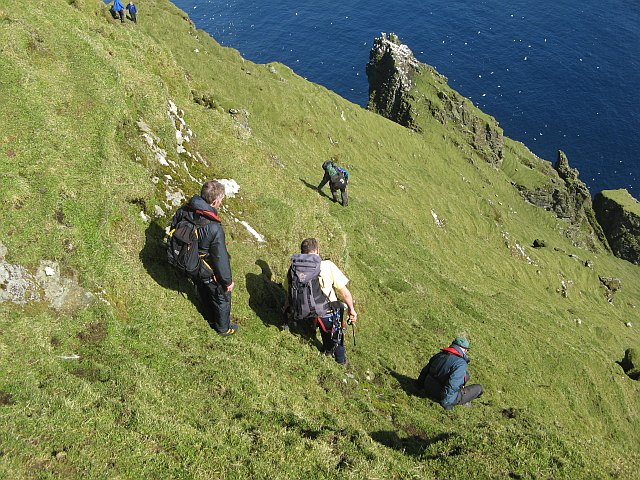
Eastern Boreray

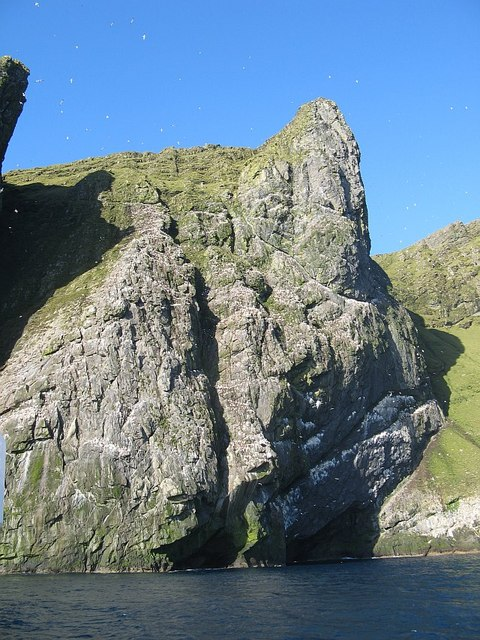
Steep crag on the east side of Boreray

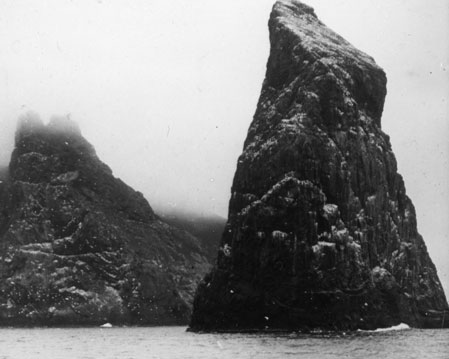
Stac Lee

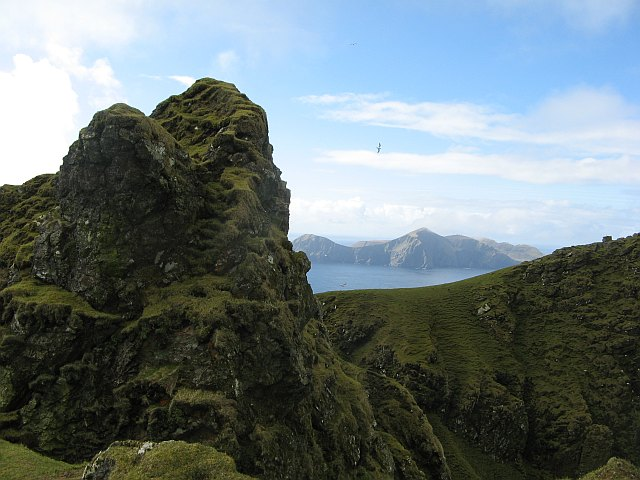
Pinnacle, Mullach an Eilean

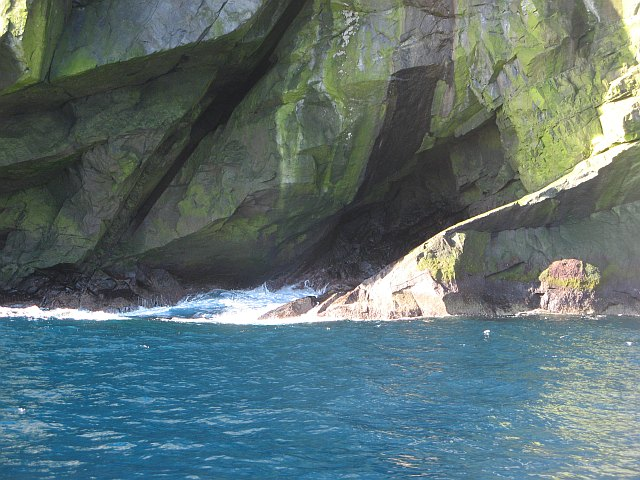
A sea cave off Boreray

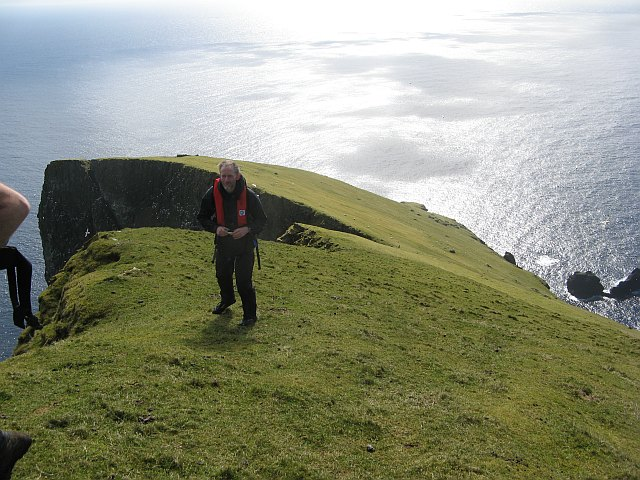
South slopes of Mullach an Eilean

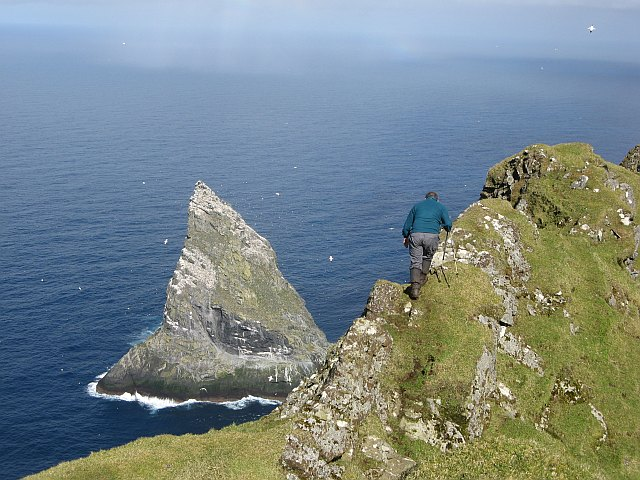
Stac an Armin

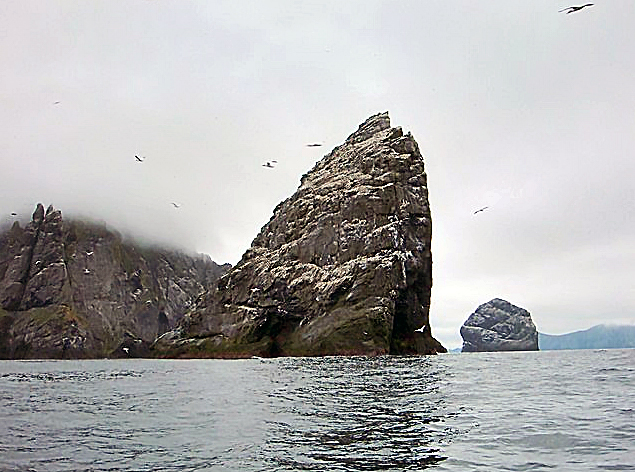
The stacs Lee and an Armin

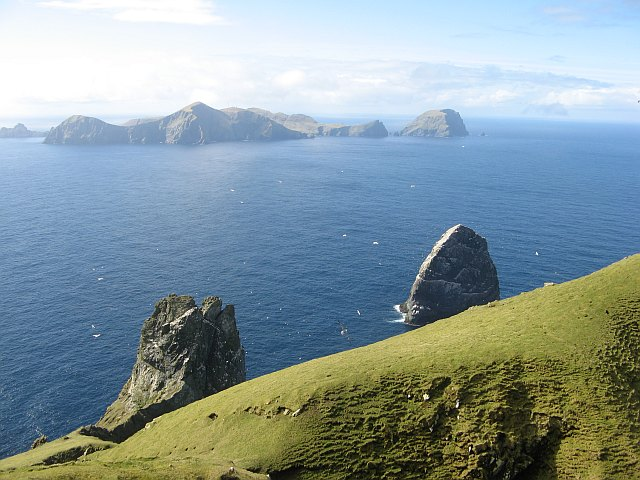
Stack Lee from above

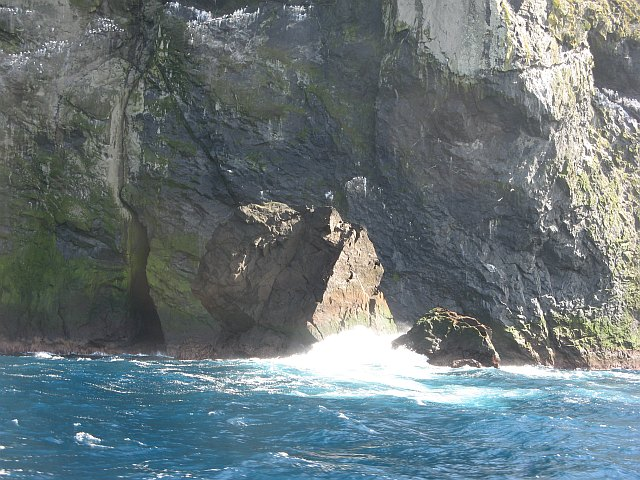
Unnamed stack beneath Boreray

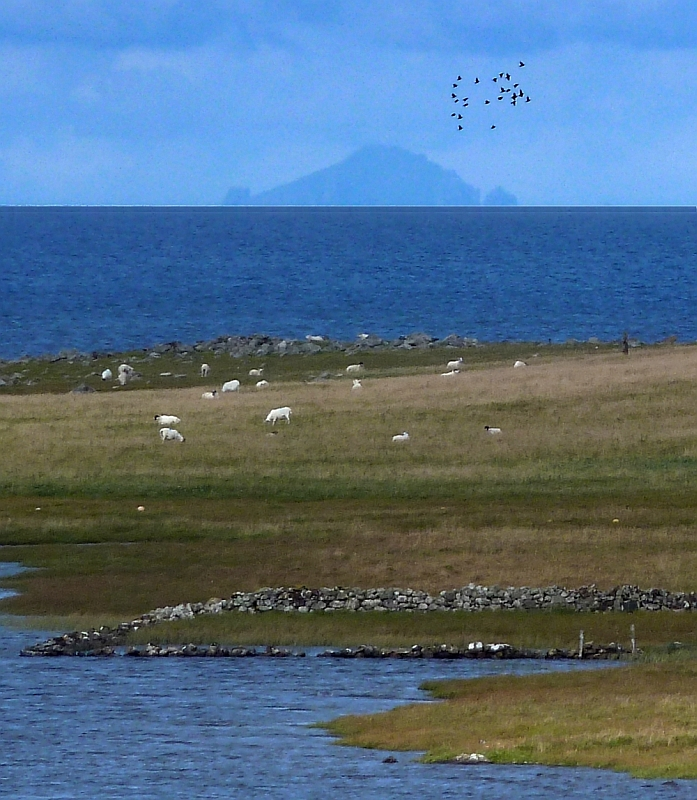
Boreray from North Uist.

== Wildlife ==
Boreray's cliffs are home for various seabirds. In 1959, 45,000 pairs of gannets were counted on the island and the two stacks. There are also over 130 different varieties of flowering plant on the island.

The island is also the home to an extremely rare breed of sheep, the Boreray, sometimes also called the Boreray Blackface or Hebridean Blackface. They are not to be confused with the Soay sheep, also originating from the St. Kilda archipelago. They are small horned sheep and are the rarest breed of sheep in the UK.

== See also ==
- List of islands of Scotland
- List of outlying islands of Scotland
