= Dick Balharry =

Scottish conservationist, writer, and wildlife photographer (1937–2015)

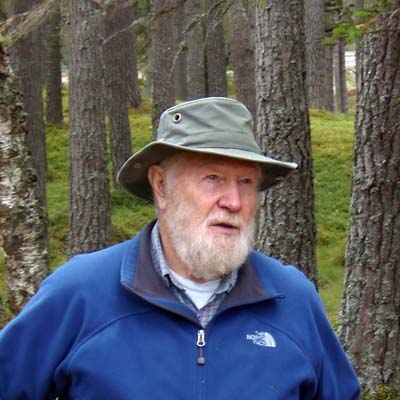
Dick Balharry, conservationist

Richard Balharry MBE (3 September 1937 – 22 April 2015) was a Scottish conservationist, writer, and wildlife photographer.

== Early life ==
Balharry was born and brought up in Muirhead, near Dundee. In 1954, after a year of technical college and an hour in a factory in Dundee, he landed a job as kennel boy and under keeper on an estate near Tighnabruaich, Argyll. In 1956, he went to work under Archie McDonald, the head stalker of Glen Lyon, and 1959 to the Red Deer Commission.

== Career ==
In November 1952, Beinn Eighe National Nature Reserve was declared and Jimmy Polson, an experienced deer stalker, was appointed as keeper. In May 1962, he was appointed warden where he was responsible for over 10,000 mountainous acres and Caledonian Pinewood.

In May 1964, Balharry found a greenshank nest with a five eggs, a rare find, but was unaware at the time of the significance of his discovery.

In January 1977, at the 29th Annual Conference of the Scottish Ornithologists Club, Balharry delivered a talk entitled 'The Conservation of the Golden Eagle'.

In 1985, when the Nature Conservancy Council bought Creag Meagaidh, he was their chief warden for north-east Scotland and roughly managing the same area when the Nature Conservancy Council became Scottish Natural Heritage.

In May 1991, Tam Dalyell and his wife spent a day in the Caledonian Pinewoods of Mar Lodge Estate in the company of Balharry (while senior warden of the Nature Conservancy Council for Scotland), Adam Watson (while at the Institute of Terrestrial Ecology, Banchory), and Dave Morris of the Ramblers Association.

In 1995, speaking of the newly formed Cairngorm Partnership, Balharry said:

Management of the Cairngorms has been failing for decades. But the time is now ripe, the money is there, the trees are still there, and we cannot contemplate the new partnership initiative failing. We are not looking to make the Cairngorms some sort of fantastic nature reserve. There has to be a living for the people in the area. But if the current landowners want estates that they can pass on with pride to their sons and daughters, then it is essential that we work together.

In 1996, he was created MBE for services to nature conservation. In 1997, he retired as SNH area manager for Badenoch and Strathspey, Moray and Nairn.

On 18 April 2015 Balharry was awarded the Royal Scottish Geographical Society's Geddes Environment medal in recognition of his outstanding contribution to conservation.

=== John Muir Trust ===
Balharry succeeded Andrew Thin as chairman of the John Muir Trust, serving 2003-2009.

In October 2004, at the Sustaining Wild Land Conference in Pitlochry, Balharry presented Adam Watson with the Trust's Lifetime Achievement Award.

In January 2005, speaking about controlling red deer numbers, he said:

My understanding is that every hind shot now costs an average of £100 after expenses if it is being shot by estate staff, while the Forestry Commission spends £5 million a year shooting deer in its forests.

If this is the case there is surely now an argument for the idea of encouraging competent local people to go to the hill to both shoot the animals for free and take away the venison.

His son, David Balharry, was appointed director in 2019.

=== Cairngorms Deer Advisory Group ===
In April 2006, Balharry attended the first meeting of the CDAG at The Inn at Loch Ericht Dalwhinnie.

=== Ramblers Scotland ===
In April 2009, Balharry was elected president of Ramblers Scotland, holding the post until March 2013. As president he was also a member of Ramblers Scotland's Scottish Council Executive Committee.

He took an active role in representing Ramblers Scotland on a number of issues including: ensuring the ethos of access legislation was upheld; fighting intrusions to wild land from inappropriate developments; and supporting the sound ecological management of upland areas.

In March 2014, Balharry was elected a vice-president of Ramblers Scotland, a post he held until his death.

=== National Trust for Scotland ===
In January 2010, he was appointed chairman of the National Trust for Scotland where he brought in a period of welcome calm and stability. In June 2010 he had an Honorary Doctorate of Science conferred on him by Abertay University, Dundee, Scotland. In September 2010 he was succeeded as chairman of the National Trust for Scotland by Sir Kenneth Calman.

== Death ==
Although born near Dundee, Balharry lived in Newtonmore where he died of cancer on 22 April 2015, aged 77.

== Bibliography ==
- Breeding success and organo-chlorine residue in golden eagles in west Scotland, J Lockie, D Ratcliffe, R (Dick) Balharry, Journal of Applied Ecology, 6 381, 1969
- Birds and mammals, in The Island of Skye, 57–64 Adam Watson, (& Dick Balharry), Scottish Mountaineering Club.
- The private life of the pine marten, in Wildlife, 20, 74–77, R (Dick) Balharry, 1978.
- Interactions between game management, nature conservation and other land uses, in Land use in the River Spey catchment (D Jenkins : Editor), R Balharry, Aberdeen Centre for Land Use, 1988.
- The implications for upland management, in Deer, Mountains and Man [Edited: H Rose], J Francis, R (Dick) Balharry, D (Desmond) Thompson, Red Deer Commission, 1990
- Wildlife Reports, in British Wildlife Magazine – Volume 3 Number 2 (106–107), R (Dick) Balharry, 1991.
- Deer Management: Shared Responsibility and Heritage Stewardship, R (Dick) Balharry, D (Des) Thompson, Deer – Volume 8 Number 6 357-9, 1991.
- Red Deer and their Management in the Cairngorms, B Staines, R (Dick) Balharry, Cairngorms Working Party, 1994
- The revival of a deer forest, in Deer, Habitats and Birds (15–21) [Editor : Hugh Rose], R Balharry, A Edgar, British Deer Society and Royal Society for the Protection of Birds, 1995.
- The impact of red deer and their management on the natural heritage in the uplands in Heaths and Moorland: Cultural landscape [Edited : D (Des) Thompson, A Hester, M Usher], B Staines, R (Dick) Balharry, D Welch, HMSO, Edinburgh, 1995
- Wild Living Cats in Scotland (survey and monitoring report), R (Dick) Balharry, Mike Daniels, Scottish Natural Heritage, 1998
- Beinn Eighe: The Mountain Above The Wood, J Johnston & (as) Dick Balharry, Birlin, Edinburgh, 2001
- Great Walks: Scotland [DVD], Cameron McNeish, (as) Dick Balharry, Striding Edge, 2006
- Ecosse (French), (as) Dick Balharry, Liz Arthur, Gallimard Loisirs, 2008
- Statement of Concern over Methods to Extend the Old Caledonian Pinewoods, Basil Dunlop, (as) Dick Balharry, Adam Watson, Ramblers Scotland, 2013

== Television ==
- Where the Eagle Flies, with Selina Scott for the BBC in 1986
