= Adam Watson (scientist) =

Scottish biologist, ecologist and mountaineer (1930–2019)

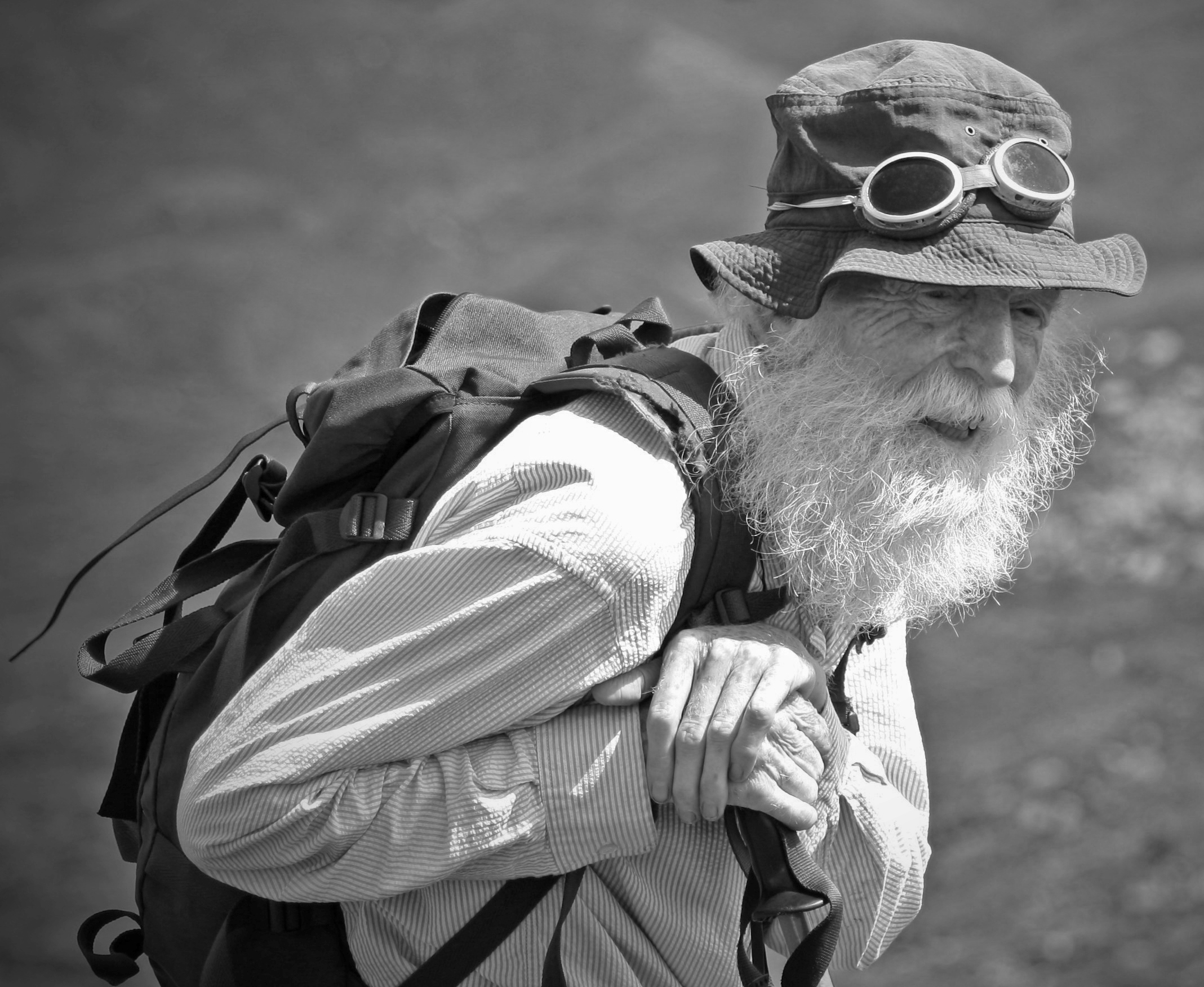
- Dr Adam Watson on Glas Maol, Gleann Beag in 2009
- Born: 14 April 1930; Turriff, Scotland
- Died: 23 January 2019 (aged 88)
- Education: University of Lancaster
- Occupation: Biologist
- Spouse: Jenny Raitt (m. 1955)
- Children: 2

Adam Watson, FRSE, FRSB, FINA, FRMS, FCEH (14 April 1930 – 23 January 2019) was a Scottish biologist, ecologist and mountaineer. He was one of the most recognisable scientific figures in Scotland due to his many appearances on TV and radio. His large academic output and contributions to the understanding of the flora and fauna in Scotland and elsewhere have been internationally recognised. Dr Watson was widely acknowledged as Scotland's pre-eminent authority on the Cairngorms mountain range.

== Early and personal life ==
Adam Watson was born on 14 April 1930 at Turriff, Aberdeenshire, Scotland. In March 1955 he married Jenny Raitt, with whom he had two children, Jenny and Adam Christopher.

== Academic achievements ==
From an early age, Watson showed considerable academic prowess. He was Dux of Turriff Primary School (1942) and of Turriff Senior Secondary School (1948) in Latin, English, Higher Latin, English, French, Science, lower History and Mathematics.

At Aberdeen University, in 1952 Watson gained 1st class honours in Pure Science (Zoology) and also won the MacGillivray Prize, Department of Natural History. In 1956, he got a PhD for his thesis on the "Annual Cycle of Rock Ptarmigan", a bird that has fascinated Watson all of his adult life. In 1967, he added a 2nd Doctorate (DSc) for scientific papers on populations and behaviour of northern animals.

Watson was inspired by the writings of Seton Gordon, whose book The Cairngorm Hills of Scotland Watson came across as a child, and was 'transformed' by its content. This sparked his lifelong interest in the Cairngorms, and Watson remained in contact with Gordon until his death in 1977.

== Published work and editorships ==
The body of work by Watson over 58 years (1944–2012) includes 23 books, 287 peer-reviewed scientific papers, 178 technical reports, 40 book reviews, and many articles in newspapers and magazines.

His editorships include:

- 1956–64 Editor, The Scottish Naturalist
- 1969 editorial board, Journal of Animal Ecology
- 1970 Editor, British Ecological Society's 10th Symposium Volume, Animal Populations in relation to their Food Resources, Blackwell Scientific Publications
- 1981–89 editorial board, Agriculture, Ecosystems & Environment

=== The Place Names of Upper Deeside ===
The Place Names of Upper Deeside is a 1984 toponymic book by Watson and Elizabeth Allan about the Gaelic place names in the upper part of western Aberdeenshire known as Deeside.

Watson started his research in 1971 and collected over the next 13 years more than 7,000 place-names largely based on interviews with 260 local people. Interviewees included the last surviving native speaker of Deeside Gaelic, Jean Bain in Crathie, Aberdeenshire.

A contemporary review said about the book: "There have been many place name studies published in Scotland during the course of the present century but none can match in detail and usefulness The Place Names of Upper Deeside by Adam Watson and Elizabeth Allan." Professor of Celtic at the University of Glasgow Derick Thomson described the book's detail and breadth in The Year's Work in Modern Language Studies. A review in The Scots Magazine called it "a remarkable gazetteer of the topography running to 220 large pages in a beautifully-presented work". The Scotsman upon Watson's death in 2019, called the book "magisterial".

Watson continued his toponymic studies later in life, and published Place Names in Much of North-East Scotland about place names in Angus and Kincardineshire in 2013, and, with Ian Murray, the book Upper Deeside and the far Highlands in 2015.

== Testimonials ==
- "He brought to the (John Muir) Trust immense expertise and authority from a lifetime's scientific work on the ecology of the Cairngorms, an unparalleled field knowledge of the hills and intense personal commitment to their special qualities."
- "Few people know more about snow in Britain than Watson, who has spent almost six decades ski-mountaineering and walking around the Cairngorms, studying snow and the birds and mammals that live in it."
- "Dr. Watson was one of the most respected authorities within his field. He has written fifteen books on landscape and wildlife, including the definitive mountaineering guide The Cairngorms, which has been in-print since the 1960s."

== Fellowships, honours and awards ==
- 1969 Nuffield Fellowship to lecture at Canadian universities
- 1971 Fellow of the Royal Society of Edinburgh
- 1980 Fellow of the Institute of Biology
- 1980 Chartered Biologist of the Institute of Biology
- 1982 Honorary Life Member, Cairngorm Club
- 1983 Fellow of the Arctic Institute of North America
- 1986 Royal Society of Edinburgh Neill Prize for 'your outstanding contribution to Natural History and in particular to your study of Red Grouse and the environmental impacts of developments in mountainous countryside’
- 1986 Distinguished Scholar at University of Virginia
- 1995 DUniv, University of Stirling (Honorary)
- 1995 Medal of the Royal Society for the Protection of Birds
- 1995 Witherby Lecturer, British Trust for Ornithology
- 1997 Honorary Life Member Worldwide Fund for Nature-UK "in recognition of..outstanding quality of work, and a lifetime of dedication to securing the future of the Cairngorms", also Honorary Life Member of the Scottish Ornithologists Club
- 2000 Emeritus Fellow of the Centre for Ecology and Hydrology
- 2003 Portrait for permanent display in the Scottish National Portrait Gallery
- 2004 Lifetime Achievement Award of the John Muir Trust, for conserving wild places – presented by Dick Balharry
- 2006 Associate Fellow of Royal Meteorological Society
- 2008 Emeritus Member of the Ecological Society of America
- 2009 Fellow of the Royal Meteorological Society
- 2012 Award for Excellence in Mountain Culture, Fort William Festival
- 2012 Golden Eagle Award of the Outdoor Writers and Photographers Guild
- 2014 DSc, Aberdeen (Honorary)

Watson was also an Emeritus member of the Ecological Society of America, and had been a member of the Scottish Mountaineering Club since 1954.

== Notable duties ==
- 1972 Chief expert witness for the Crown in the Cairngorm Plateau Disaster Fatal Accident Inquiry in February at Banff (five children from Ainslie Park High School, Edinburgh, and an instructor died in the snow at Feith Buidhe on the plateau in November 1971)
- 1981 Main scientific witness commissioned by the Nature Conservancy Council at the Lurcher's Gully Public Inquiry, on behalf of the Institute of Terrestrial Ecology
- 1984 One of the first Trustees of the John Muir Trust, Trustee 1984–97, Honorary Adviser 1997–2003
- 1990–92 Commissioner, Countryside Commission for Scotland
- 1995–97 board member, Cairngorms Partnership
- Independent monitoring scientist for downhill ski areas at the Lecht (1984 to date), Glenshee (1986 to date), Cairn Gorm (1990–99), Glencoe (1996), and gave technical advice to Nevis Range in November 1995.
- Author, Environmental Baseline Study for Glenshee Ski Centre (1987), Environmental Baseline Study of Damaged Ground at Cairngorm Estate (1994), and nine Environmental Statements on proposed ski developments at Lecht (3), Cairn Gorm (2), Glenshee (2) and Glencoe (2).

== Later years ==
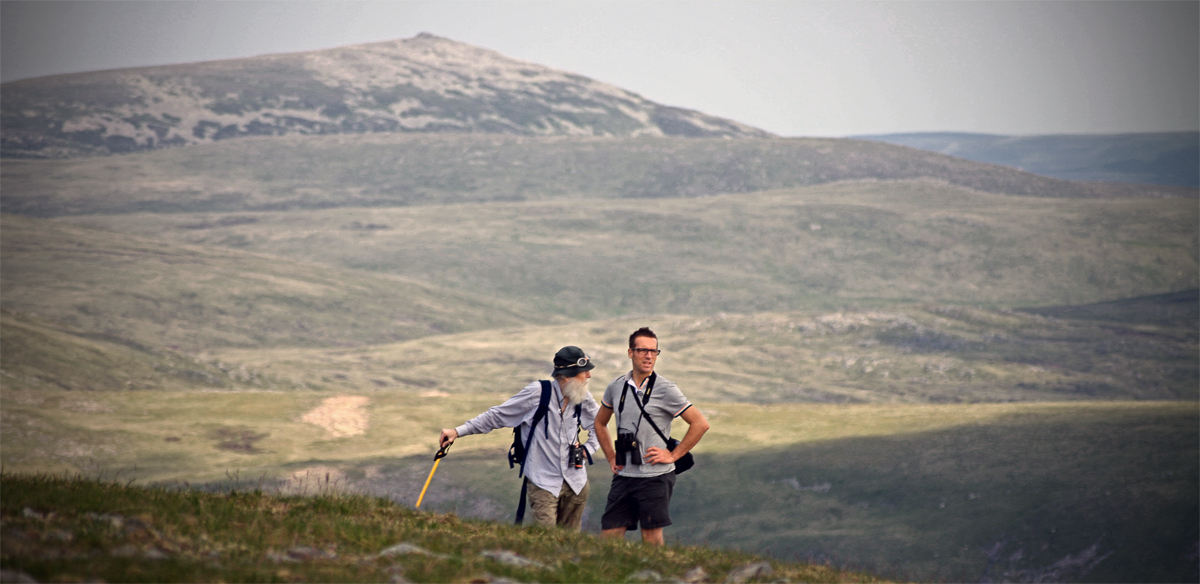
Dr Adam Watson and Iain Cameron carrying out annual snow-patch survey from Glas Maol, Gleann Beag, July 2009.

Watson was fascinated by snow since childhood and published widely on the longevity of snow-patches on Scotland's mountains. In May 2009 he led a walk at Glenshee on which he showed the participants the long-lying snow-patches of the Cairngorms and the effects of snow-lie on vegetation.

== Bibliography ==
- 1963. Mountain hares. Sunday Times Publications, London. (AW & R. Hewson)
- 1970. Animal populations in relation to their food resources (Editor). Blackwell Scientific Publications, Oxford and Edinburgh.
- 1970. Adam Watson & Gordon R Miller, Grouse Management (Game Conservancy, Fordingbridge, and 1976 new edition)
- 1974. Desmond Nethersole-Thompson & Adam Watson, The Cairngorms: their Natural History and Scenery (Collins, London, 1981 new edition Melven Press, Perth)
- 1975. Adam Watson, The Cairngorms, Scottish Mountaineering Club District Guide (also 1992 and later editions)
- 1982. Robert Moss, Adam Watson & John G. Ollason, Animal Population Dynamics (Chapman & Hall, London)
- 1982. Kai Curry-Lindahl, Adam Watson & R, Drennan Watson, The Future of the Cairngorms (North East Mountain Trust, Aberdeen)
- 1984. Adam Watson & Elizabeth Allan, The Place Names of Upper Deeside (Aberdeen University Press)
- 1998. Stuart Rae & Adam Watson, The Cairngorms of Scotland (Eagle Crag, Aberdeen)
- 2008. Adam Watson & Robert Moss, Grouse. HarperCollins, Collins New Naturalist Library No 107, hardback and paperback
- 2010. Cool Britannia: snowier times in 1580–1930 than since. Paragon Publishing, Rothersthorpe (by AW & I. Cameron)
- 2011. It's a fine day for the hill. Paragon Publishing, Rothersthorpe
- 2011. A zoologist on Baffin Island, 1953. Paragon Publishing, Rothersthorpe
- 2011. Vehicle hill tracks in northern Scotland. The North East Mountain Trust, Aberdeen, published imprint Paragon Publishing, Rothersthorpe
- 2011. A snow book, northern Scotland: based on the author's field observations in 1938–2011. Paragon Publishing, Rothersthorpe
- 2012. Some days from a hill diary: Scotland, Iceland, Norway, 1943–50. Paragon Publishing, Rothersthorpe
- 2012. Human impacts on the northern Cairngorms: A. Watson's scientific evidence for the 1981 Lurcher's Gully Public Inquiry into proposed Cairn Gorm ski developments, and associated papers on people and wildlife. Paragon Publishing, Rothersthorpe
- 2012. Birds in north-east Scotland then and now: field observations mainly in the 1940s and comparison with recent records. Paragon Publishing, Rothersthorpe (by AW & Ian Francis)
- 2013. Place names in much of north-east Scotland. Hill, glen, lowland, coast, sea, folk. Paragon Publishing, Rothersthorpe
- 2013. Points, sets and man. Pointers and setters, stars of research on grouse, ptarmigan and other game. Paragon Publishing, Rothersthorpe
- 2013. Hill birds in north-east Highlands. Field observations over decades – ptarmigan, red grouse, golden plover, dotterel, bird counts. Paragon Publishing, Rothersthorpe
- 2013. Mammals in north-east Highlands – red deer, mountain hares, others. Paragon Publishing, Rothersthorpe
- 2014. More days from a hill diary: Scotland, Norway, Newfoundland, 1951–80. Paragon Publishing, Rothersthorpe
- 2014. Plants in north-east Highlands – timing of blaeberry growth, tree regeneration, land use, plant orientation. Paragon Publishing, Rothersthorpe
- 2015. Place name discoveries on Upper Deeside and the far Highlands. Paragon Publishing, Rothersthorpe (by AW & Ian Murray)
- 2016. Essays on lone trips, mountain-craft and other hill topics. Paragon Publishing, Rothersthorpe
- 2019. "Observations of Golden Eagles in Scotland: A Historical & Ecological Review". Hancock House Publishers, Surrey, BC, Canada. ISBN 978-0-88839-030-1 ISBN 978-0-88839-173-5
