= List of sea stacks in Scotland =

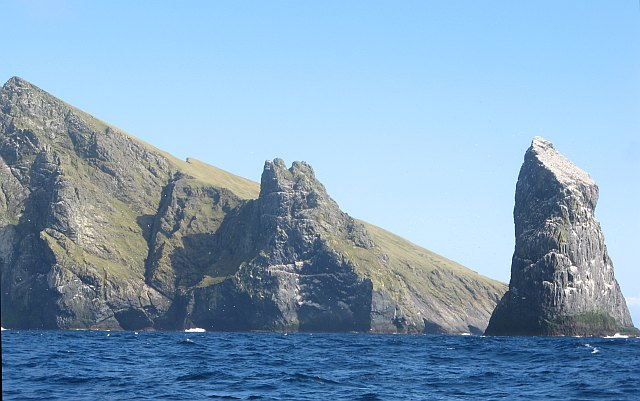
The 172m high Stac Lee off the coast of Boreray, St Kilda

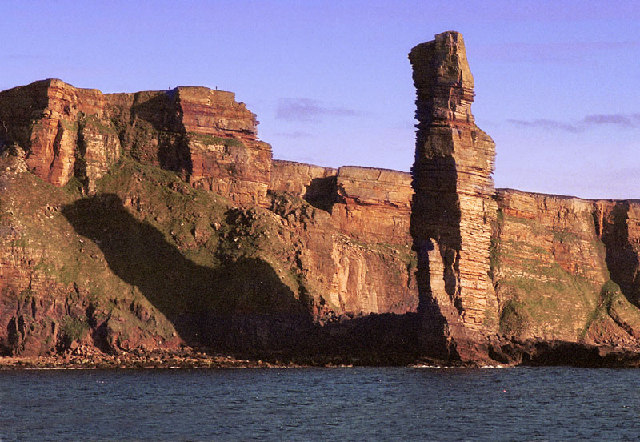
The Old Man of Hoy, "the single most famous stack in the British Isles"

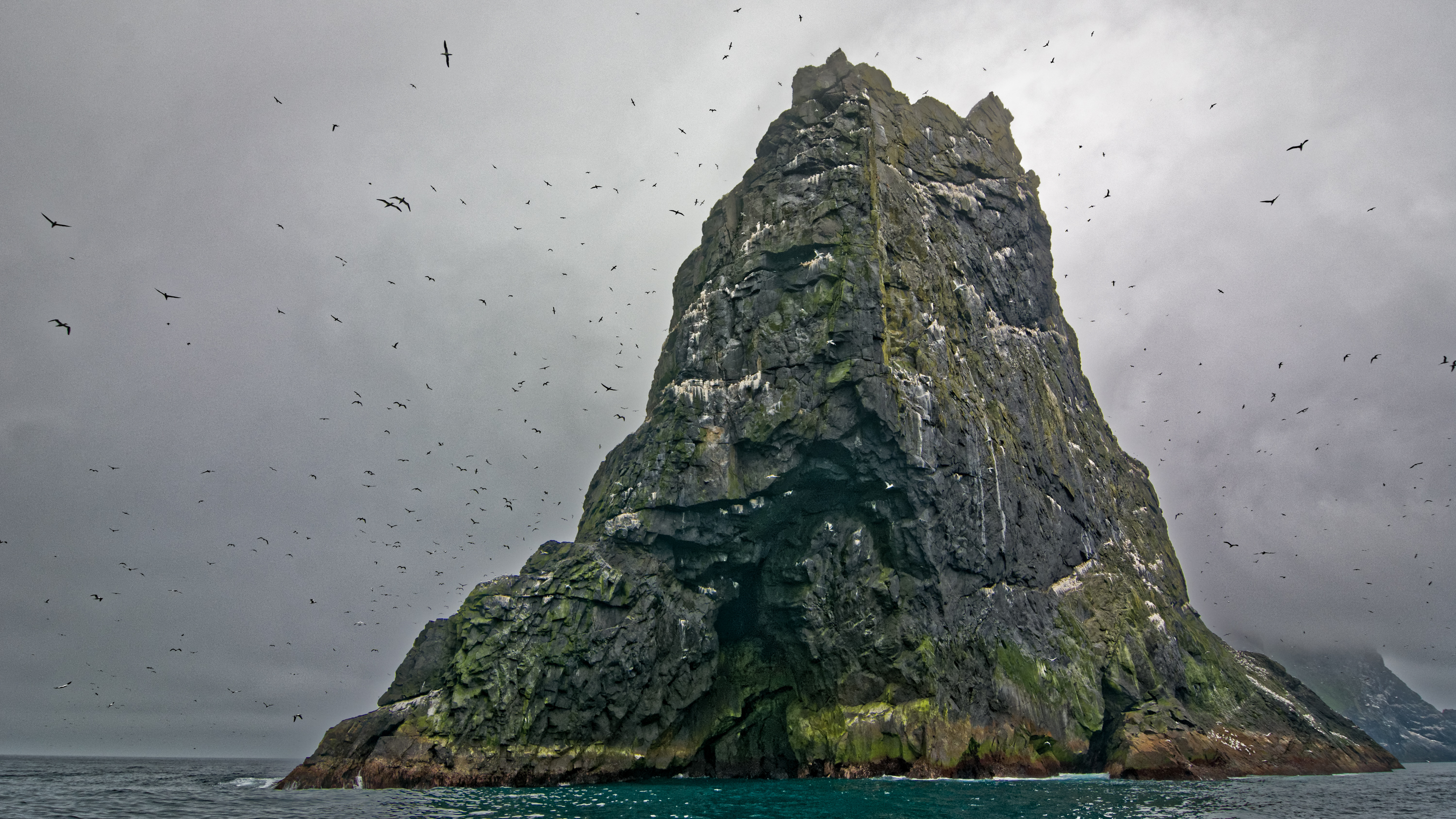
Stac an Armin, at 196m the highest stack in the British Isles

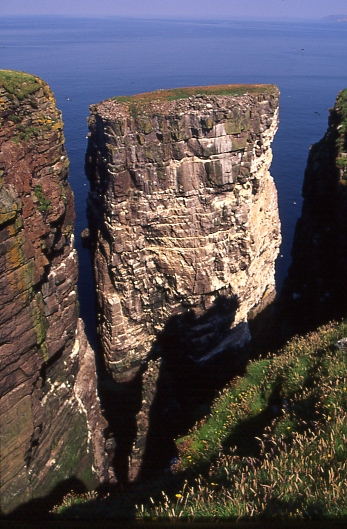
Great Stac of Handa

This is a list of stacks in Scotland that are surrounded by the sea at high tide.

The highest stacks in Scotland are Stac an Armin and Stac Lee in the St Kilda archipelago and the Old Man of Hoy, Orkney. Some provide well known and challenging rock climbing routes. There are 275 or more stacks in the country; their names are influenced by the Norse, Gaelic and English languages. In Shetland, where there are over 100 stacks, the names are often from Norn, a local variant of Norse.

The sport of stack climbing did not take off until the mid-1960s with the exploits of Tom Patey and in July 1967 15 million people watched the climbing of the Old Man of Hoy live on BBC television. The idea was originally suggested by Patey who helped put together a team of six climbers who were filmed undertaking the ascent. This was described as connecting "an armchair audience with the elite of a sport subculture intent on conquering one of Britain's most spectacular geological treasures”. Following Patey's untimely death in 1970 development of the sport in Scotland largely ceased until the late 1980s and the arrival of Mick Fowler on the scene.

== Definitions and etymology ==
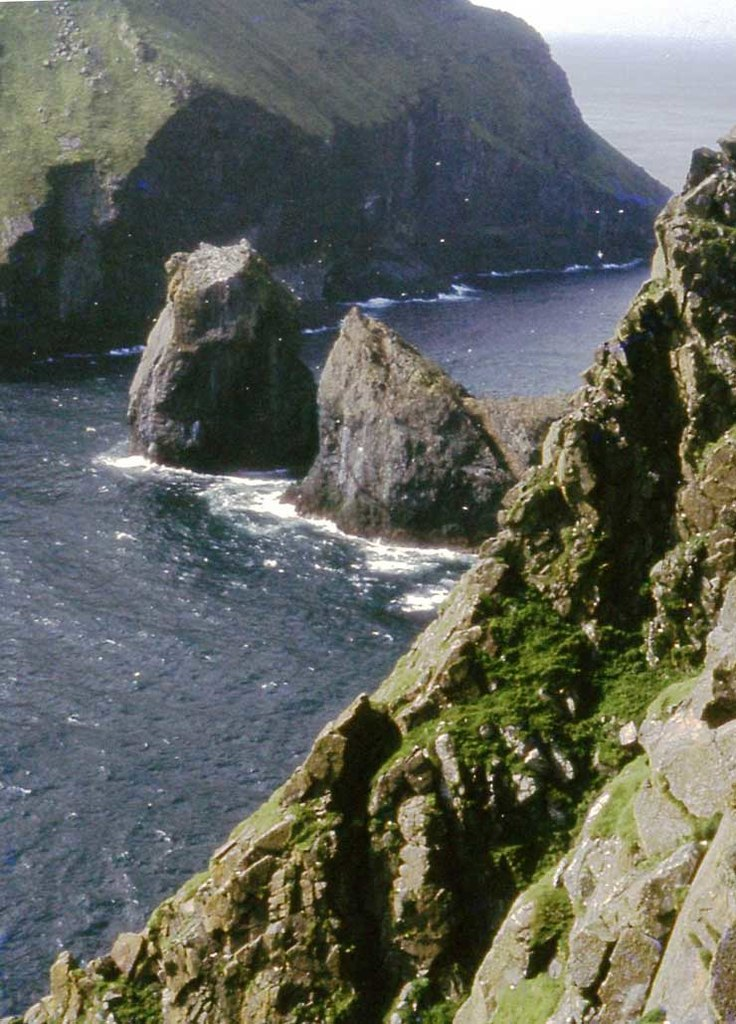
Stac Biorach, climbed by alpinist Richard Barrington in 1883, which he described as the most dangerous ascent he had ever undertaken

Cleare (1974) defined stacks from a rock-climbing perspective using three criteria:

- "A stack should be higher than it is wide in at least one of its planes.
- Within reason there is no minimum height, except that if it is high enough to be worth climbing, then it's a stack.
- A stack should have been formed by the action of the sea."

Mellor (2020) offers similar conditions: "a stack is an isolated cone, pinnacle or tower of rock entirely surrounded by the sea at high tide." He goes on to suggest that the difference between a stack and an island is that if the top is significantly wider in diameter than the height then it is an island, and that a stack should be at least 6 metres (20 ft) high.

From a geological perspective a stack is a landform consisting of a steep and often vertical column or columns of rock in the sea near a coast, formed by wave erosion. This definition excludes isolated steep-sided, rocky oceanic islets typically of volcanic origin, sometimes called "volcanic stacks". In the main listing below three different types of stack are identified:

- Sea stacks
- Outlying stacks, many of which are of volcanic origin
- Wide stacks that fail Mellor's definition of height to summit diameter above but which either have "stack" in their name or are clearly a "tower of rock entirely surrounded by the sea".

There are numerous small pinnacles around the Scottish coast, many of them in remote locations. Such features are often not well-documented and the main list is thus confined to the larger and better known examples.

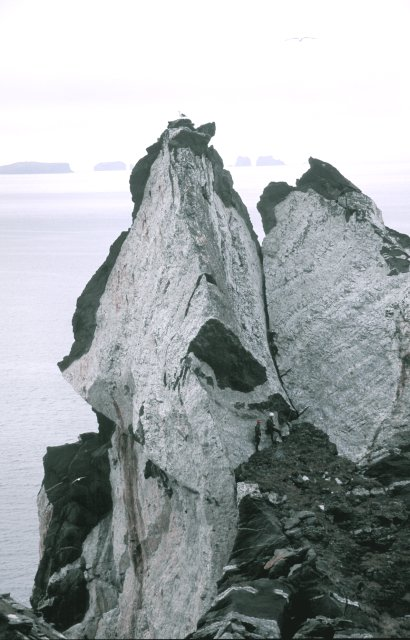
Ern Stack, a prominent landmark on Yell but not a sea stack

The word 'stack' is derived from the Old Norse: stakk-r and is often rendered in the Norn of Shetland as stakk and in modern Gaelic as stac or the plural stacan.

Several descriptive names are used in more than one location. Examples include:

- Gaada Stack, meaning "hole stack" and used to describe stacks that incorporate natural arches;
- Moo Stack, of which there are at least four in Shetland;
- Brough, which is cognate with Old Norse: borg meaning "fortification" and broch;
- Castle, Scottish Gaelic: caisteal, is typically used for an isolated stack;
- Ern, Norn for "eagle".

The name "stack" is however also sometimes appended to features other than sea stacks such as cliff-girt headlands and a number of such features are also listed below.

== Distribution ==
Of the 275 stacks in Scotland identified by Mellor (2020) circa 110 are located around the coasts of Shetland of which 80 are around the coast of the Mainland. Most of the rest are found off the coasts elsewhere in the Highlands and Islands. He also lists 70 stacks in England, 10 in Wales and 55 off the island of Ireland.

== Climbing history ==
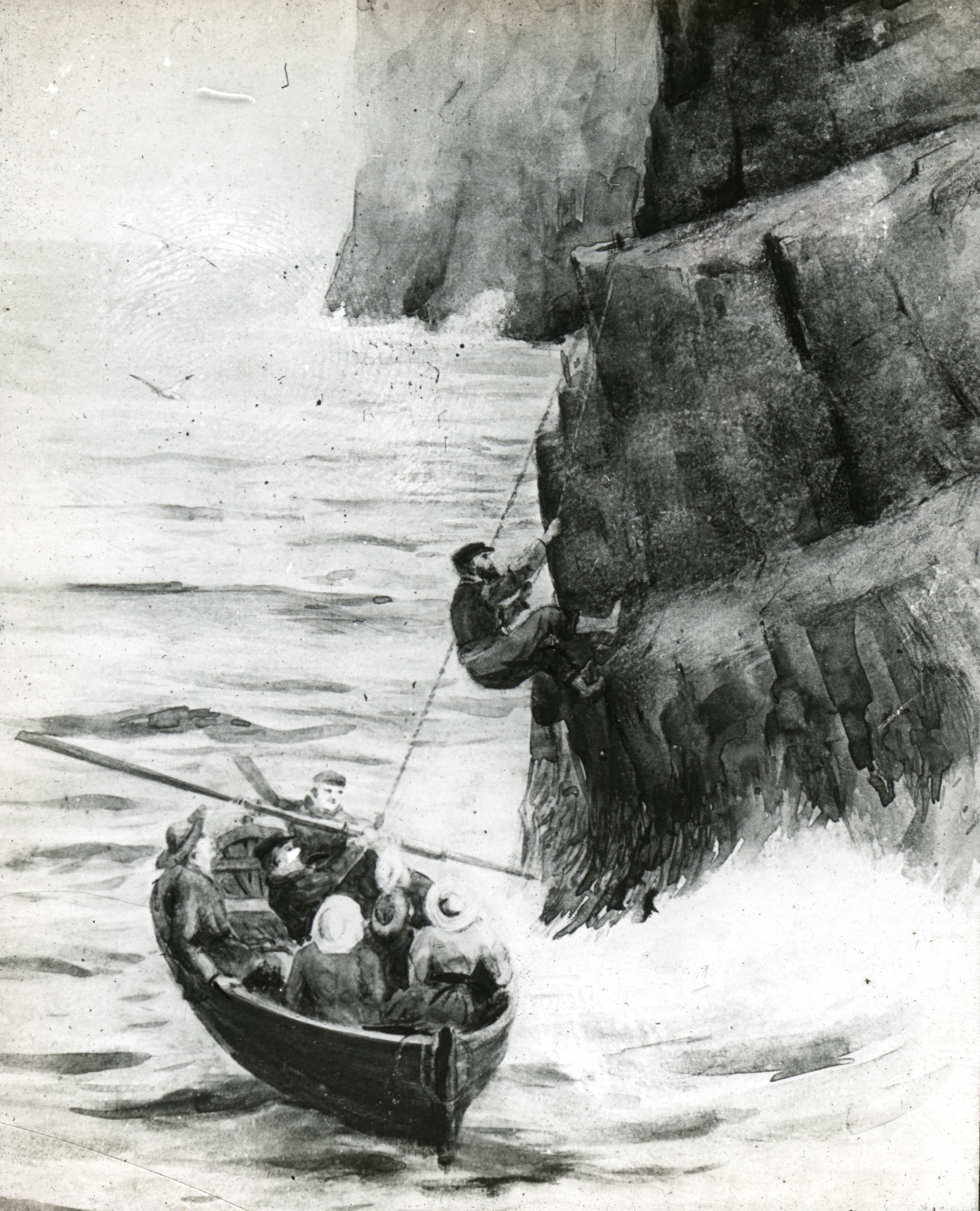
"Landing place on Stac Lii", illustration from Climbing in St Kilda by Norman Heathcote

The first stack climbers in Scotland were the residents of the now uninhabited islands of Hirta and Mingulay who were dependent on the bounty provided by seabirds. The first record of the recreational ascent of a sea stack in Scotland is likely that of Richard Manliffe Barrington, who climbed Stac Biorach in 1883. (Note: This ascent of Stac Biorach is the subject of a number of conflicting assertions. Mellor has this FA taking place in 1883 by "a C. Barrington". Similarly, Haswell-Smith describes the training of young St Kildan's on the stack recorded in 1698 and then states that "The first recorded outsider to climb both this stack and Stac Lee was Charles Barrington in 1883". This refers to Richard's brother Charles who would have been 49 years old in 1883. Quine also states that the FA was in that year but by Richard Barrington. The National Trust for Scotland have R. Barrington as the climber but the date as 1890. There is thus confusion about both the date of the ascent and which brother was the ascender. However, R. Barrington was 16 years younger than Charles and the Dictionary of Irish Biography makes it clear that it was the former who travelled to "remote islands off Scotland (1883, 1886, 1890)". The original paper by R. Barrington in the Alpine Journal in 1913 also states that the year of the ascent was 1883 and that he ascended the stack with the help of two St Kildans, Donald McDonald and Donald McQueen. Barrington wrote “the fact that a certain rivalry existed between myself and an elder brother who first ascended the Eiger induced me to visit St. Kilda in 1883, as I wished to test the ability of the natives as cragsmen, to compare them with Swiss guides, and to study the fauna and flora of this remote island, of which little was then known. It is thirty years ago next June since I ascended Stack-na-Biorrach, and therefore I trust I shall not be accused of hasty self-advertisement”.) Sixteen years later Norman Heathcote and his sister Evelyn climbed Stac Lee. He wrote that Stac Lee was "not a difficult climb" and that two other women had also reached the summit.

Nonetheless, the main theme of the sport in the UK until the mid-1960s was "incidental stack climbing in pleasant and accessible locations". Yorkshireman Ian Clough ascended one of Macleod's Maidens on Skye in 1959 but the picture changed completely with the exploits of Tom Patey, (aka "Doctor Stack") whose day job was as a GP in Ullapool. He began with the Old Man of Stoer in 1966 and followed this up with ascents of Am Buachaille, the Old Man of Hoy and the Great Stac of Handa. After his death when descending The Maiden in 1970 "most Scottish stack explorations abruptly ceased".

There was then a hiatus of a dozen years as climbers began "putting up harder and harder lines on comfortable stacks until they felt strong enough to venture north again". In 1982 Arnis Strapcans put up a new route on the Old Man of Hoy. Two more routes were created on this stack in 1984 and with the arrival on the UK scene of Mick Fowler in 1985 events moved apace. He climbed the Old Man of Stoer in 1988 and numerous others over the next few years, "his most outrageous adventure" being on The Needle, another stack off the west coast of Hoy. His regular partners on these exploits were Andy Nisbett, Craig Jones and Jon Lincoln who made up the "famous four" completing, for example, the first ascent of The Runk in Shetland in May 1992.

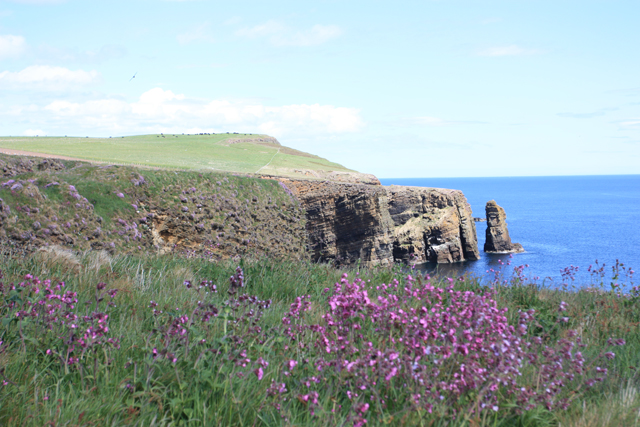
The Clett of Crura off a headland on South Ronaldsay on which four seaward climbs of 25m have been recorded

Irishman Iain Miller made a solo second ascent of the Clett of Crura, South Ronaldsay in 1999 and since then has been involved in about 150 first ascents around Britain and Ireland. Nonetheless, in 2020 it was estimated that over 50 stacks around the British Isles have never been climbed.

In 2019 Red Széll became the first blind climber to ascend the three "Tom Patey stacks" of Am Buachaille, the Old Man of Stoer and the Old Man of Hoy. The 2020 film Climbing Blind documents the first blind lead of the Old Man of Hoy by Jesse Dufton. In 2024 Aden Thurlow, an 11-year-old boy, successfully lead climbs on Am Buachaillie and the Old Man of Stoer.

In 2023, by arrangement with the National Trust for Scotland, Stac Biorach was ascended again 130 years after Barrington became the first non-St Kildan to do so. Climber Robbie Phillips said it "was like walking in the footsteps, or climbing in the fingerprints, of the St Kildans. It's a testament to their bravery and mental fortitude; to climb onto that sea stack 70m above the raging Atlantic without even shoes is wild to imagine".

== Main list ==
These are stacks which are well-known local landmarks greater than 15m in height, prominent rock climbing pinnacles, notable isolated stacks or are verified as being greater than 50 metres (160 ft) in height.

Name	Type	Image	Coordinates	Location	Elevation	Meaning of name	Notes
Am Buachaille	Sea stack		58°32′14.0″N 5°05′33.6″W	Sandwood Bay, Sutherland	65m	The Herdsman	First climbed in 1967 by Tom Patey, J Cleare and Ian Clough. (Note: Gazetteer for Scotland states the FA was in 1968.)
Am Plastair	Outlying stack		57°49′50.0″N 8°38′42″W	St Kilda	42m	Possibly "the rascal" from Scottish Gaelic: peallastair (Note: Quine (2000) suggests the name may mean Blue Stack "if Scandinavian... otherwise, Place of Splashing".)	There is a fast tide race between this stack and Soay which "can make boating rather hazardous".
Arnamul	Wide stack		56.80°N 7.66°W	Mingulay, Outer Hebrides	121m	Of Norse origin, possibly "eagle holm" or "eagle island"	Although precipitous, sheep were grazed on its relatively flat summit during the human occupation of Mingulay. (Note: Although the Mingulay outliers of Aranamul and Lianamul do not necessarily meet rock climbing definitions of a stack, they are often referred to as such by writers with other interests e.g. Haswell-Smith, Buxton and Harvie-Brown.)
Bow Fiddle Rock	Sea stack		57°42′23.8″N 2°51′00.9″W	Moray	15m	The arch resembles the tip of a fiddle bow	
Bradastac	Sea stack		57°49′28.0″N 8°34′46.2″W	St Kilda	62m	"Steep stack" from Old Norse: bratti-stakkr	Located northwest of the summit of Conachair where the sheer cliffs fall into the sea from a height of 427 metres (1,401 ft).
Caisteal a' Mhorair	Sea stack	(Note: There are several stacks on Tràigh Ghearadha that increase in size from north to south. Caisteal a' Mhorair is the tallest of these at right on this image. See Canmore for an aerial photo.)	58°21′57.0″N 6°12′55″W	North Tolsta, Lewis	21m (Note: Probably referred to as "Grey Castle" by Mellor (2020), which he lists as 70m in height. Canmore has a more realistic figure of 70 feet (21 m).)	Nobleman's castle	The summit is encircled by the remains of a wall that surrounds a rectangular chamber that may have been a medieval stronghold.
Cley Stacks	Sea stacks		60°15′46″N 1°41′58″W	Walls and Sandness, Shetland	60m	May be related to Old Norse: kléi originally meaning steatite although there is no certain connection.	There are two large stacks here. The eastern one reaches 55m but it is probably not completely seagirt. Both have natural arches.
Duncansby Stacks	Sea stacks		58°37′50.9″N 3°02′04.8″W	Caithness	85 m	Consists of 4 stacks; Great Stack, Witch’s Hat Stack, The Knee and The Little Knee. (Note: Witch’s Hat Stack would seem to be, on the evidence of Mellor (2020) and elsewhere, the highest stack off the coast of the island of Great Britain but no source specifically confirming this has yet been found.)	The first ascent of the 85m Witch's Hat was by Mick Fowler, Nikki Duggan, Paul Allison and Jon Lincoln in 1989.
Dunnicaer	Sea stack		56°57′10.7″N 2°11′42.7″W	Stonehaven	21 m	A tautological placename meaning "fortress"	In 2015 excavations by an Aberdeen University team guided by climber Duncan Paterson revealed the presence of a Pictish hill fort.
Erne's Stack (Bay of Deepdale)	Sea stack	(Note: The stack is in the middle distance, at the southern extremity of Bay of Deepdale in this image. The much smaller Litla Stack is also shown in front of Erne's Stack.)	60°16′19″N 1°41′28″W	Bay of Deepdale, Shetland	70m	Eagle's stack	There are no records of any ascent of this stack which has a triangular cross-section.
Erne's Stack (Wester Wick)	Sea stack		60°09′37″N 1°28′56″W	Wester Wick, Shetland	55m	Eagle's stack	There are three large stacks here - Erne's Stack, a 55m stack southeast of Westerwick Erne's Stack North, which reaches 51m and Erne's Stack East, at 35m high.
Gaada Stack	Sea stack		60°09′29.6″N 2°04′38.4″W	Foula	38m (Note: Another source has 32m.)	Hole stack	Comprising Devonian sandstone, there are two natural arches between three "legs".
Gow’s Castle	Sea stack		57°43′10.4″N 3°22′34.4″W	Moray	10m	Gull's castle	The former Gow’s Castle Stack was destroyed in 1941 during bomb practice for WW2. The existing stack was first climbed in 1986.
Great Stac of Handa	Sea stack		58°23′15.5″N 5°11′50.1″W	Sutherland	72m (Note: Mellor has "about 107m high" and Haswell-Smith 115m.)		First climbed in 1876 by Donald McDonald, a native of St Kilda, who crossed the 24m gap between the stack and Handa "swinging hand-over hand from a rope".
Hoo Stack	Outlying stack		60.249180°N 1.089504°W	Nesting, Shetland	34m		It is 2.5 km north-east of North Isle of Gletness
Lianamul	Wide stack		56°48′58.9″N 7°39′28.2″W	Mingulay, Outer Hebrides	112m	Flax mound or island, although the reason is not clear.	Martin Martin described the rock as "almost inaccesible, except in one Place... with the assistance of a Rope of Horse-hair."
Maiden Stack	Sea stack	(Note: Brei Holm is at right with Maiden Stack immediately to its left. An unanmed stack in front of Maiden Stack appears as if joined to it to the left of the highest point.)	60°19′46″N 1°39′26″W	Papa Stour, Shetland	7.6m	Also known as Frau Stack and Muckle Fru	In the 14th century a small house was built there by Þorvald Þoresson, in order to prevent his daughter from meeting men.
Macleod’s Maidens	Sea stacks		57°19′57.3″N 6°34′56.9″W	Skye	65m	Three stacks supposedly named after the drowning of a MacLeod chieftain's wife and two daughters.	Ian Clough climbed the first of the Maidens in 1959.
Mina Stac	Sea stack		57°49′25″N 8°33′58″W	St Kilda	70m (Note: Gazetteer for Scotland has "approximately 70m". A second source states 61m.)	"Lesser stack" from Old Norse: minni-stakkr or possibly "smooth stack" from Scottish Gaelic: mìn	
North Gaulton Castle	Sea stack		59°00′02.7″N 3°21′56.4″W	South of Yesnaby, Orkney mainland	50m		A Rover 214 car was helicoptered onto the summit for an advertisement in the Radio Times in 1994.
Old Man of Hoy	Sea stack		58°53′10.7″N 3°25′50.2″W	Hoy, Orkney	137m	Resembles a human figure. Originally the stack had an arch at the bottom giving the impression of two legs.	The stack was first climbed in 1966. In 1967 an ascent featured in a live BBC outside broadcast featuring three pairs of climbers including Chris Bonington and Tom Patey.
Old Man of Stoer	Sea stack		58°15′39.8″N 5°22′57.2″W	Sutherland	73m		First climbed in 1966 by Brian Henderson, Paul Nunn, Tom Patey, and Brian Robertson.
Out Stack	Outlying stack		60°51′37.1″N 0°52′25.1″W	Shetland	27m	Known locally as "Ootsta"	The northernmost point of Scotland.
Ramna Stacks	Outlying stacks		60°39′43″N 1°18′43″W	Shetland		Ramma or Ramna is a disparaging term in Norn e.g. ramnatrack means ill-spun yarn.	There are three stacks, with a fourth at Outer Stack just to the north.
Rockall	Outlying stack		57°35′46.7″N 13°41′14.3″W	Oceanic	17m	Uncertain	It is 301 kilometres (163 nautical miles) west of Soay, St Kilda.
Stac an Armin	Outlying stack		57°52′48.4″N 8°29′45.4″W	St Kilda	196m	Stack of the warrior	The highest sea stack in Scotland. Three men and eight boys from Hirta were marooned here from about 15 August 1727 until 13 May 1728. In July 1840, the last great auk seen in Britain was caught on the stack.
Stacan Geodh Bhrisidh	Sea stack		58°23′13″N 5°11′55″W	Handa	40m	Stack of the broken chasm	First ascent by Hamish Maclnnes, G.N. Hunter and D.F. Long in 1969.
Stac an Dunain	Sea stack		58°37′37.2″N 5°00′16.2″W	Sutherland	50m	Possibly stack of the birds	
Stac an Tùill	Sea stack		58°16′29″N 6°54′59″W	Bearasay, Outer Hebrides	43m	Stack of the cave from Scottish Gaelic: tuill	There is a cave on Bearasay just to the north of the stack.
Stac Biorach	Outlying stack		57°49′41.4″N 8°37′20.1″W	St Kilda	73m	Sharply pointed stack Also known as Thumb Stack because of the small size of the handholds.	First described in 1698 its location "remained a mystery" until Barrington's ascent in the late 19th century. (Note: Quine (2000) describes Stac Biorach as "almost inaccessible" and adds that "even the St Kildans stopped climbing it around 1840". However, this cannot be entirely true given their assistance to Barrington in 1883.)
Stac Clo Kearvaig	Sea stack		58°37′03.0″N 4°56′15.3″W	Cape Wrath, Sutherland	40m	Scottish Gaelic: clò has various meanings including "sea". Old Norse: ker means "sailing vessel". This may then be "stack of the sea-galley bay".	There are two summits, both first ascended in June 1989.
Stac Dona	Outlying stack		57°49′32.3″N 8°37′29.6″W	St Kilda	27m	Scottish Gaelic: dona means "bad"	The St Kildans gave this name to the stack because it provided few nesting spaces for birds.
Stac Lee	Outlying stack		57°51′58.4″N 8°30′35.5″W	St Kilda	172m	Possibly shelter stack or the blue stack	A small bothy on the summit was formerly used by St Kildan fowlers.
Stac Levenish	Outlying stack		57°47′30.7″N 8°30′38.8″W	St Kilda	62m	Scottish Gaelic: leibhinish means "stream" or "torrent"	An underwater tunnel runs through the stack, creating a "cauldron of turbulent waters".
Stac Shoaigh	Outlying stack	(Note: Stac Shoaigh at right with Stac Biorach at left.)	57°49′42.2″N 8°37′09.2″W	St Kilda	62m	Also known as Soay Stac	A tunnel runs through the stack.
Stack of Old Wick	Sea stack		58°25′16″N 3°05′10″W	Caithness	40m	It is located just south of the Castle of Old Wick	The first ascent of the climb called "Lord Oliphant’s Bicycle" was by Mark Robson and Simon Richardson in 2004.
Sule Stack	Outlying stack		59°01′25.7″N 4°30′24.7″W	Orkney	37m	Gannet stack	It is 49 kilometres (26 nautical miles) north of the Scottish mainland.
The Drongs	Outlying stack		60°27′45.1″N 1°31′45.5″W	Shetland	59m	The stacks, from Old Norse: drangr	Consists of 4 stacks; Main Drong, Slender Drong, Slim Drong and Stumpy Drong. They lie one kilometre off the coast of Hillswick Ness, Northmavine.
The Fiddler	Sea stack		57°16′47″N 6°27′46″W	Talisker Bay, Skye	45m		There is a second 23m stack here, which may be called "The Bow".
The Maiden	Sea stack	(Note: The Maiden at right with the "western stack" at left.)	58°34′46.1″N 4°35′08.4″W	Sutherland	56m	The Gaelic name Stacan Bana means "the female stacks"	On 25 May 1970, Tom Patey fell to his death attempting to abseil the Maiden. The smaller "western stack" is 46m high.
The Needle	Sea stack	(Note: There is an image of the area at Geograph here. The Needle is at right just to the left of the entrance to the narrow geo at far right.)	58°47′29.76″N 3°18′47.52″W	Hoy, Orkney	61m		A grade XS 5c climb first ascended by Mick Fowler, Steve Sustad and Nikki Dugan in May 1990.
The Runk	Sea stack		60°28′48″N 1°32′26″W	St Magnus Bay, Shetland	45m	Norn: runk means "a big, stout person"	First climbed in May 1992.
Yesnaby Castle	Sea stack		59°01′02.8″N 3°21′38.2″W	Yesnaby, Orkney mainland	35m		First climbed in 1967 by a group including Joe Brown.

== Other stacks ==
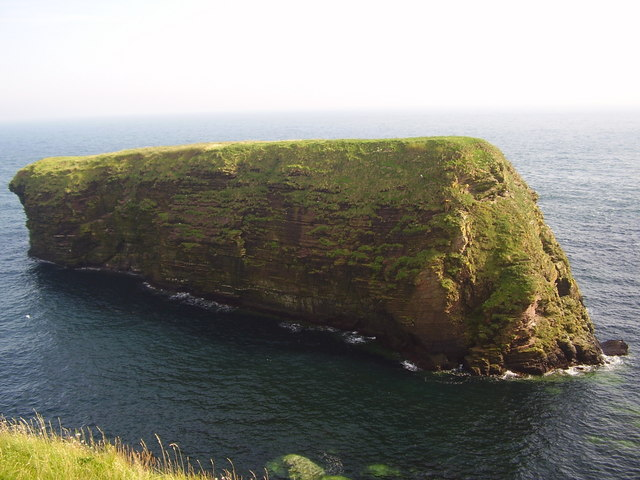
Stack o' Brough near Wick

This is a selection of the many other stacks in Scotland. All the below are included in Mellor (2020) except those with the symbol No. which have been identified from Ordnance Survey maps and/or other sources as cited. According to Mellor there is no record of some of them having been climbed.

=== Sutherland ===
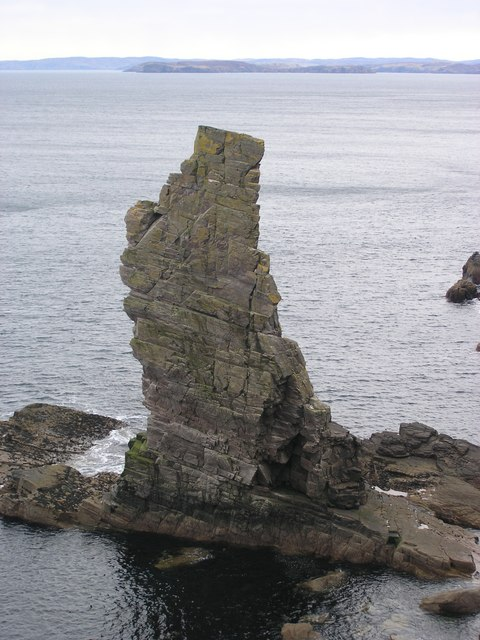
Stac Thormaid, A' Mhòine

- Stac na Faoileige, a 30m high stack off Handa
- Am Bodach, 37m high by Cape Wrath
- A’Chailleach, by Cape Wrath
- Stac Thormaid, A' Mhòine
- Geodha Brat East & West, A' Mhòine, 30 and 25m high respectively.
- Puffin Stack, Melvich
- Lady Bighouse Rock, 25m high

=== Caithness ===
- Fort Rock by Scrabster
- Clett Rock by Scrabster
- The Stacks by Dunnet Head
- Stack o' Brough, 35m high south of Wick No.
- South Stack, 44m high, south of Stack o' Brough No.
- Sinclair's Bay Stack
- Stack of Ulbster
- Roy Geo Stacks by Lybster

=== East coast ===
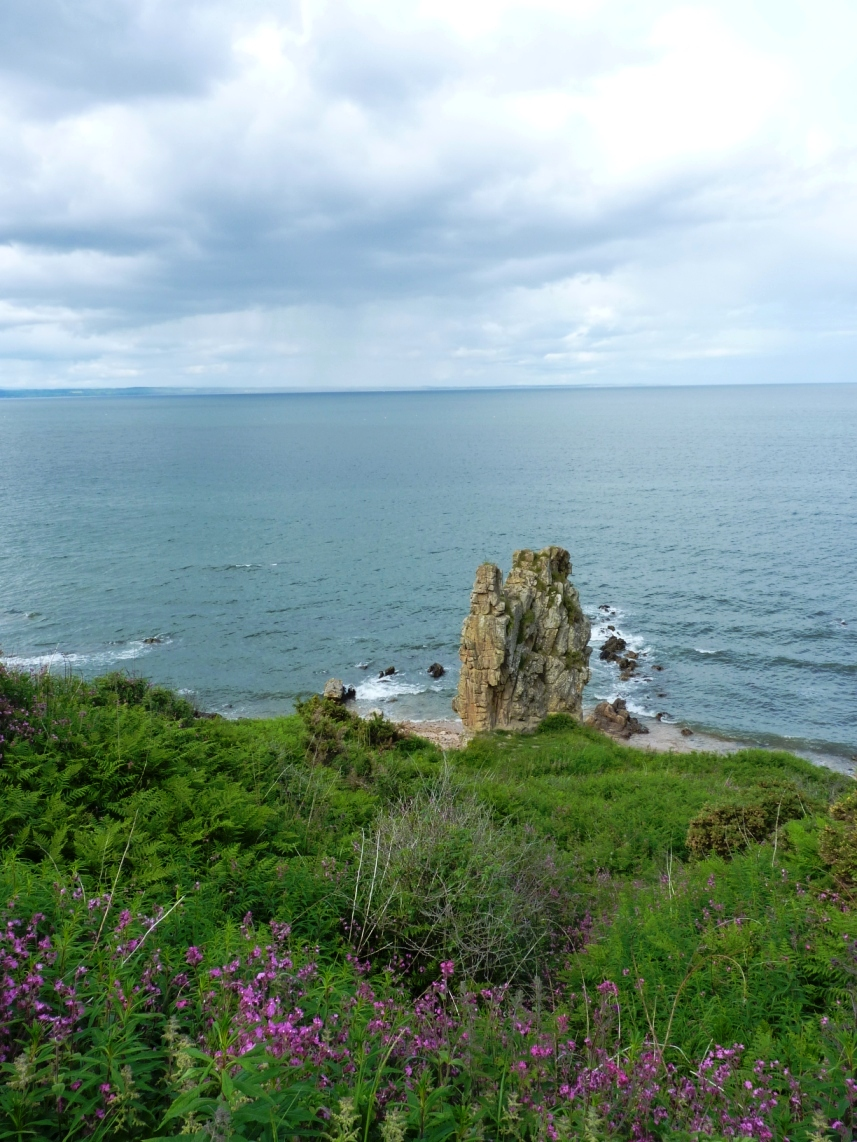
Maiden Rock near St Andrews

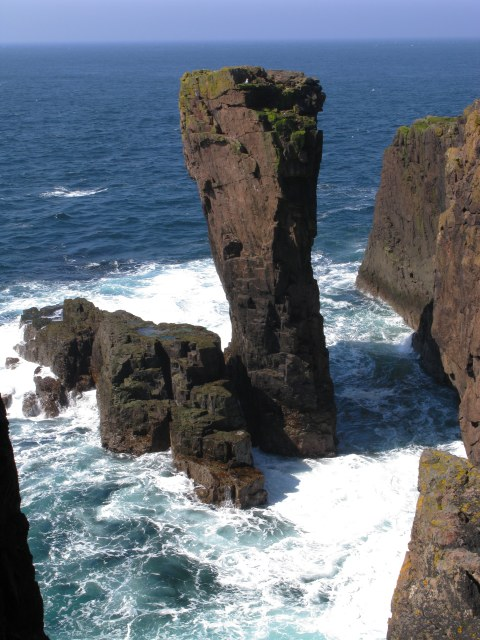
Unnamed stack off Papa Stour

- Cummingston Main Stack near the village of Cummingston in Moray
- Logie Head Pinnacle near Cullen
- Head of Garness near Macduff
- The Tooth near MacDuff
- The Molar near MacDuff
- Dunbuy Rock, Cruden Bay
- The Sugar Loaf, Cruden Bay
- Berry’s Loup near Peterhead
- Oldcastle near Peterhead
- Long Slough Pinnacle south of Aberdeen
- The Humpback south of Aberdeen
- The Knapps Of Downies south of Portlethen
- Brown Jewel near the village of Muchalls in Aberdeenshire No.
- May Craig, near Muchalls
- Doonie Point, near Muchalls
- Castle Rock Of Muchalls
- Elephant Rock south of Montrose
- Maiden Rock east of St Andrews
- Wheat Stack, near Coldingham
- The Souter, near Coldingham

=== Galloway ===
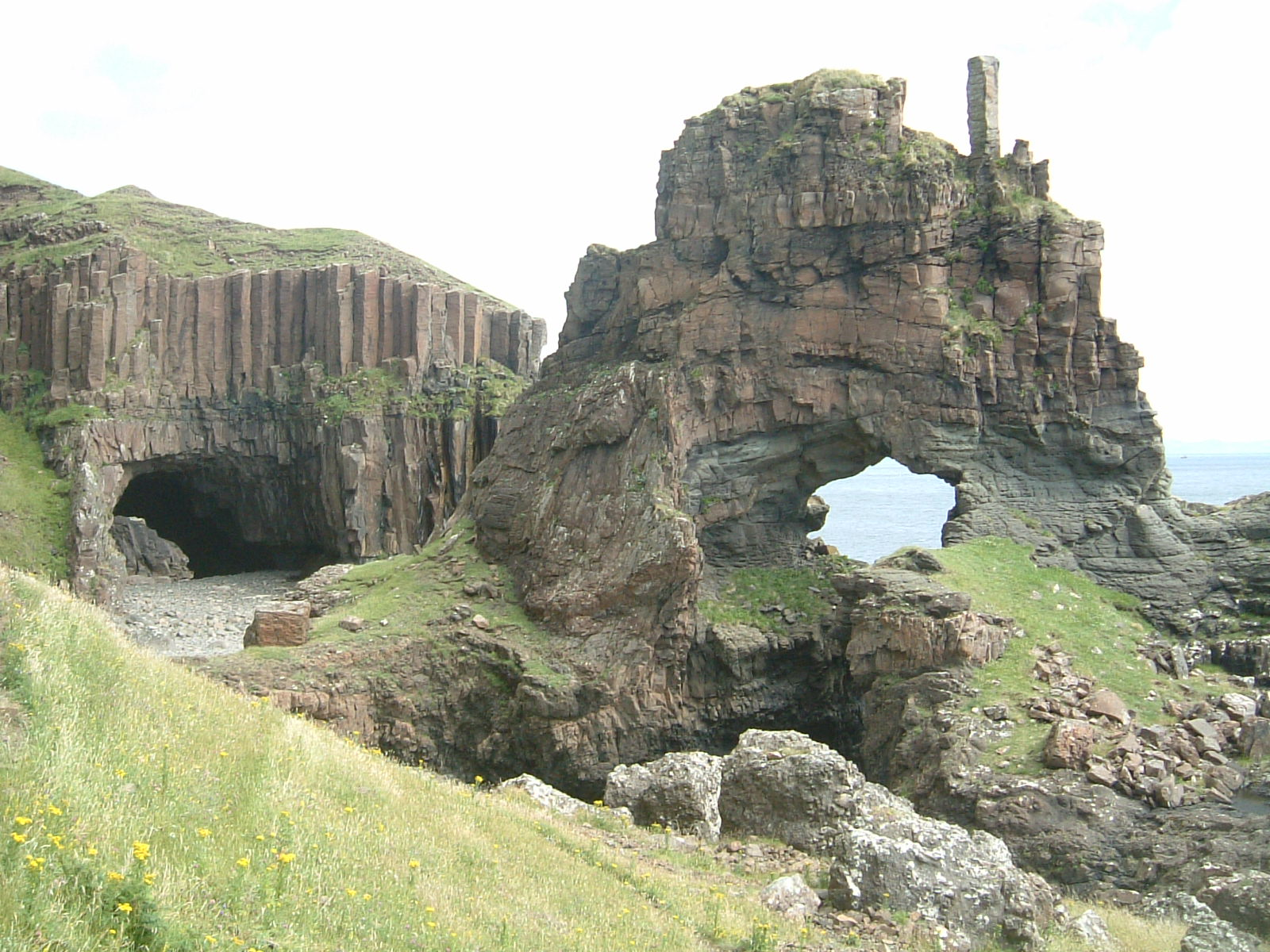
Carsaig Stack on Mull is one of the Carsaig Arches and provides a 15m VDiff climb

- Burrow Head, 30m high near Isle of Whithorn
- Monreith Stack
- The Black Slab, Crammag Head, near Kirkmaiden
- Witch Rock, Portpatrick, first ascended in 1899
- Juniper Rock, northwest of Stranraer

=== Islay and Jura ===
- American Monument Stacks, on the coast of The Oa, Islay
- Impact Stack, near Loch Tarbert, Jura (Note: The location is not clear and it may be a stack on the many cliffs in that area rather than a sea stack.)

=== Mull and environs ===
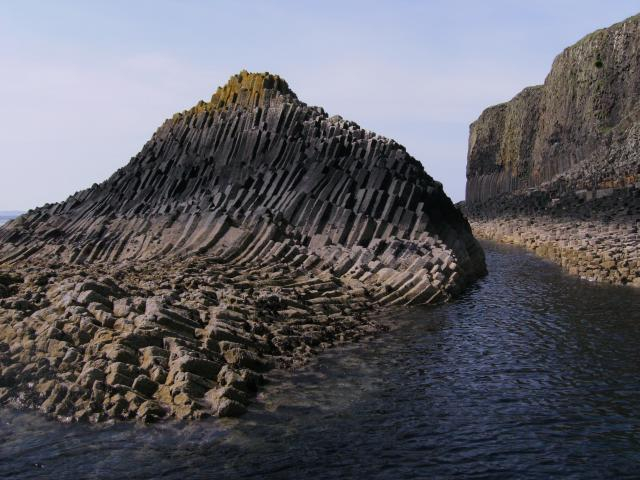
Am Buachaille, Staffa. Not to be confused with the more famous one in Sutherland

- Castle Coefin, Lismore
- Carsaig Stack, Mull
- Stac Glas Bun Un Uisge, Mull
- Croig, Mull
- Quinish Poiunt, Mull
- Stac an Aoineidh, Iona
- Stac Leath, Iona
- Stac Mhic Mhurchaid, Iona
- Am Buchaille, Staffa
- Dun Cruit, Lunga

=== Small Isles ===
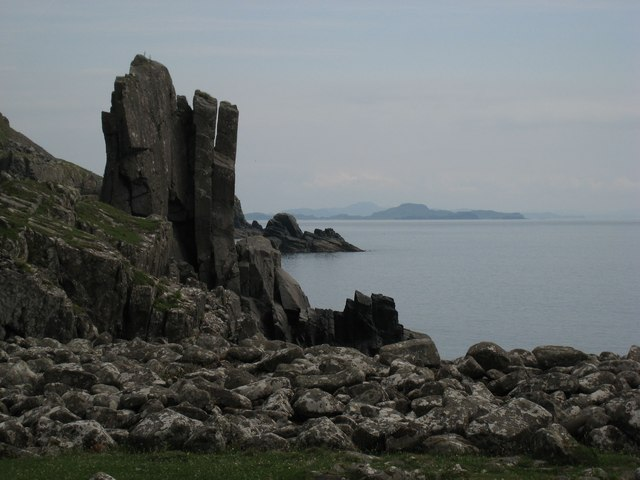
Papadil Pinnacle on the southwest coast of Rùm

- The Spichean, Muck
- Stac nam Faoileann, Rùm
- Covenanter's Point Stack
- Papadil Pinnacle, Rùm
- Fist and Finger, Rùm
- Harris Bay Stack, Rùm
- An Coroghon, Canna
- An t-Each, Canna
- An Caraghon, Canna
- Lorcail

=== Skye ===
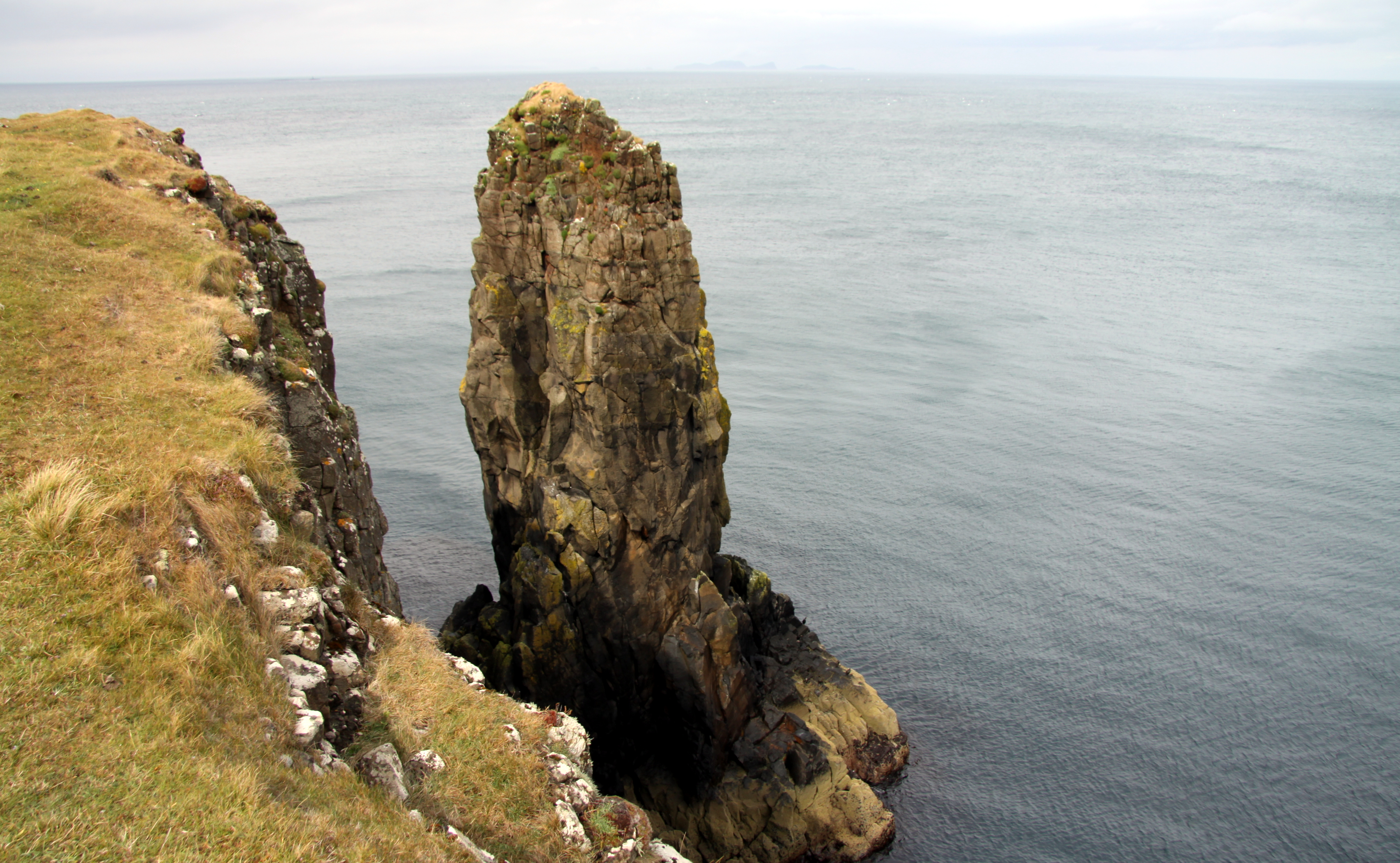
One of the Rubha Hunish Stacks, Trotternish

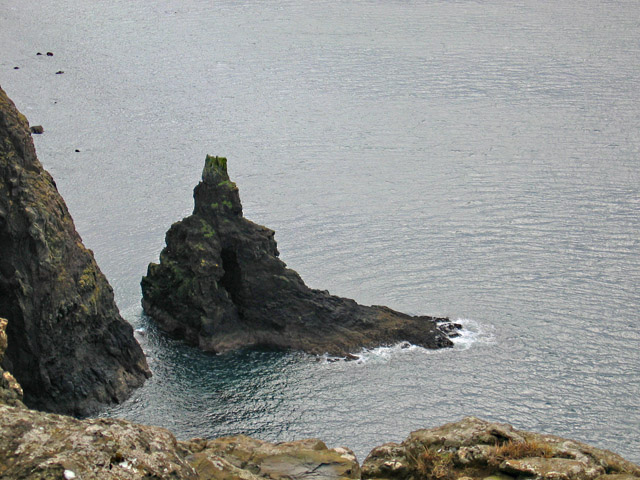
Stac an Tuill off Skye, so named as there is a hole through the centre

- Bob Bob Stack, Trotternish
- Broken Needles, Trotternish
- Stac Buidhe, Trotternish
- Stac Laclainn, Trotternish
- Stacan Gobblach, Trotternish
- Rubha Hunish Stacks, Trotternish
- Stack of Skudiburgh, Trotternish
- Ru Idrigill Stack, Trotternish
- Glen Lorgasdal Stacks, Duirinish
- Stack a'Mheadhais, Minginish
- Stac an Tuill, Minginish
- Stac Suisnish, near Torrin
- Fladda-chùain stacks

=== Outer Hebrides ===
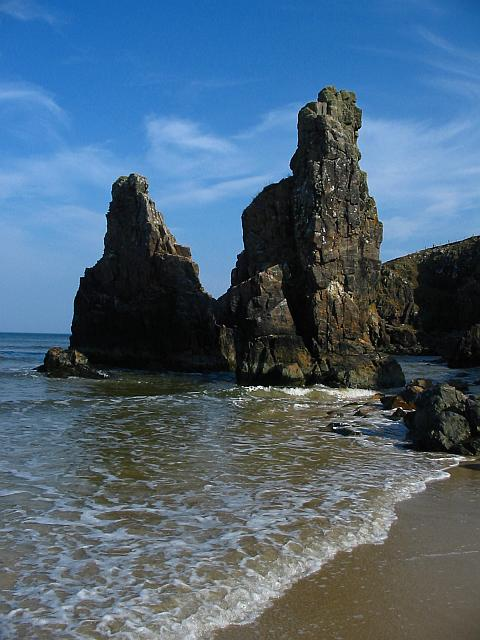
Unnamed stacks near Caisteal a' Mhorair, Lewis

- Stac Shuardail, south of Knock, Lewis
- Stac na Caoraich Lachduinne, Carloway
- Stac a’Bhanain, Loch Roag
- Stacan Neadacliv, near Uig
- Stac na Berie, Uig
- Stac Leathann, Uig
- Stacageo, near Mealista
- Haskeir Eagach
- An Stac, off Eilean Leathan, Eriskay, although it is not clear there is a genuine sea stack here
- Gèarum Beg, Mingulay
- Gèarum Mòr, 51m high but arguably a precipitous islet rather than a true stack. In 1868 a wave washed over the top of it.
- Na Gilleachan Ruadh at the northern tip of Mingulay, aka The Red Boy No.

=== St Kilda ===
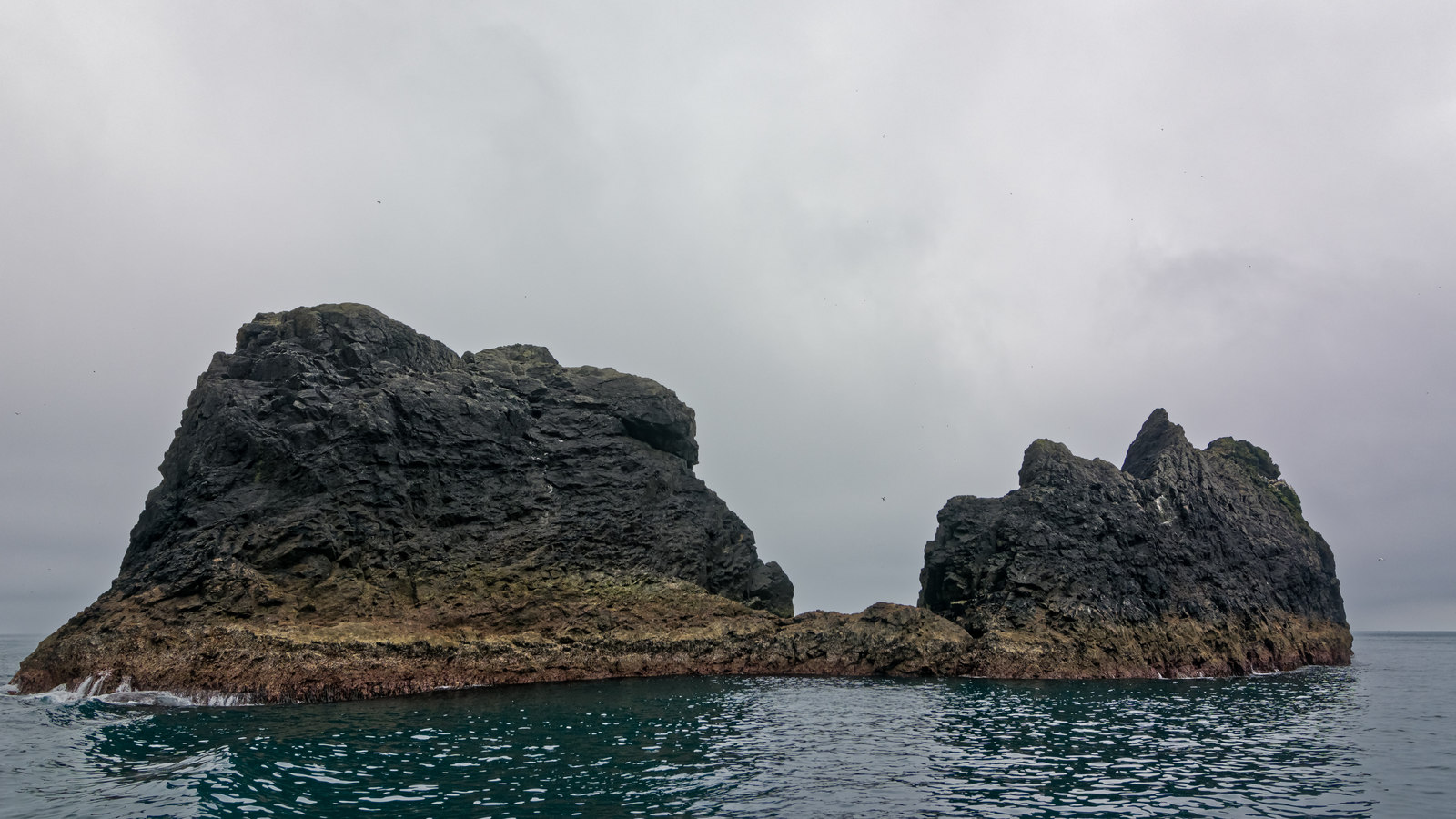
Sgarbhstac off Boreray (Note: Mellor (2020) lists Am Bhiran at the same location, which may be the smaller of the two stacks in the image.)

- Sgarbhstac, Boreray from Old Norse: skarfa-stakkr meaning "cormorant stack" No.
- Sgeir Mhòr, at the foot of the cliffs of Mullach Bi No.
- Sgeir Cùl an Rubha, on the western side of Dùn No.
- There is a small, unnamed stack east of Sgeir Cùl an Rubha and the headland of Giumachsgor No.

=== Orkney ===
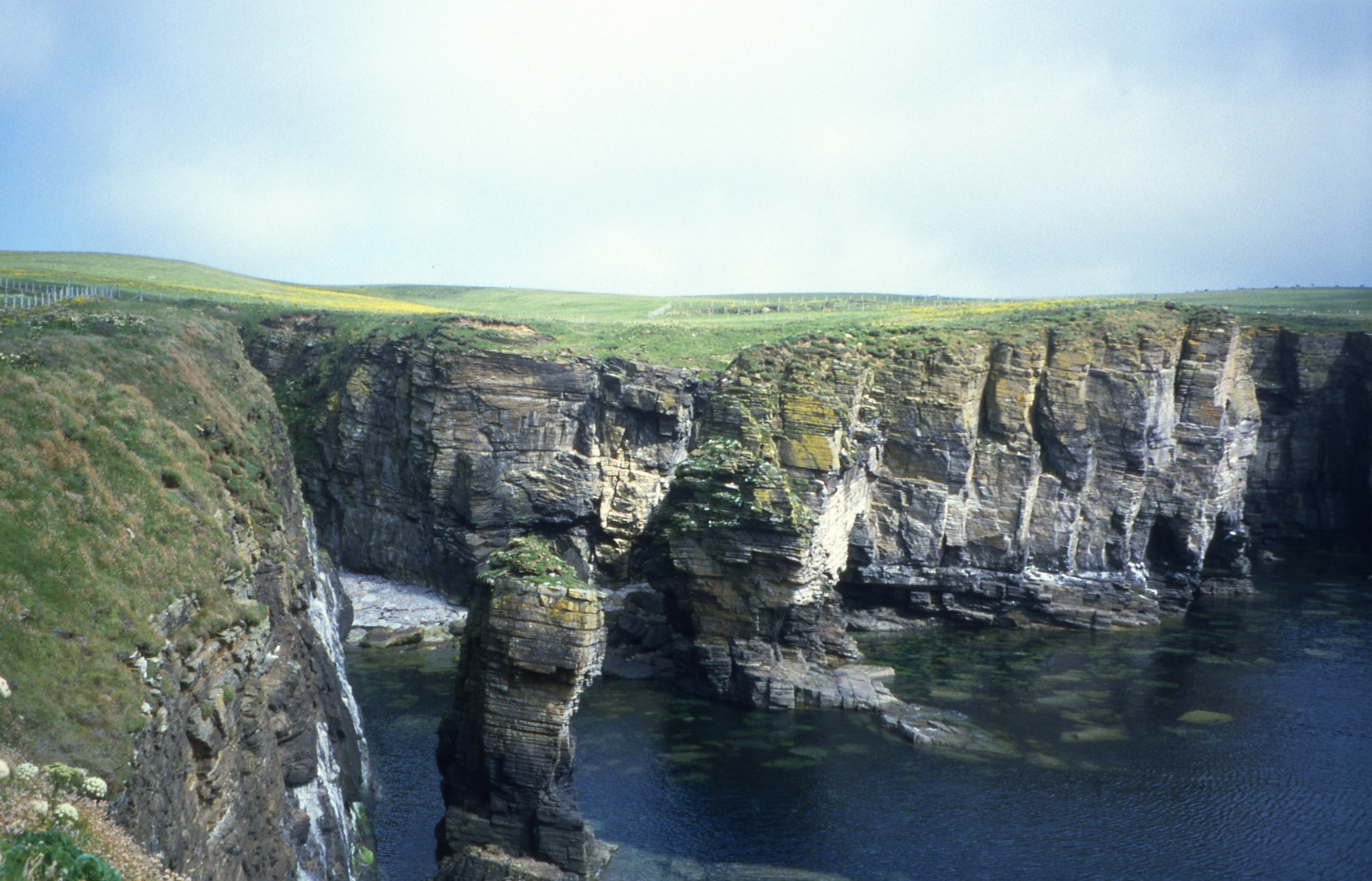
The smaller of two stacks at Castle o' Burrian, Westray, described as "an amusing wee stack" by a local website

- Stack of Kame, South Ronaldsay
- Clett of Crura, South Ronaldsay
- The Clett, South Rondaldsay (Note: The Clett is south of the Clett of Crura and the smaller of the two stacks in the bay of Wind Wick.)
- Stackabank, South Ronaldsay
- Stack o'Roo, Birsay
- Standard Rock, Birsay
- Hemp Stack, south of Kirkwall
- The Brough, Stronsay
- Castle o' Burrian, Westray

=== Shetland islands ===
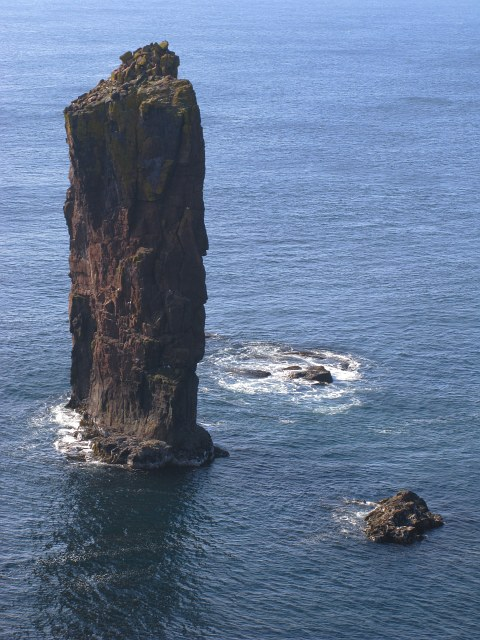
Snolda Stack, Papa Stour

==== Fair Isle ====
- Stacks of Wirrvie
- Stacks of Skroo
- Breiti Stack
- Fogli Stack
- Hundi Stack

==== West and East Burra ====
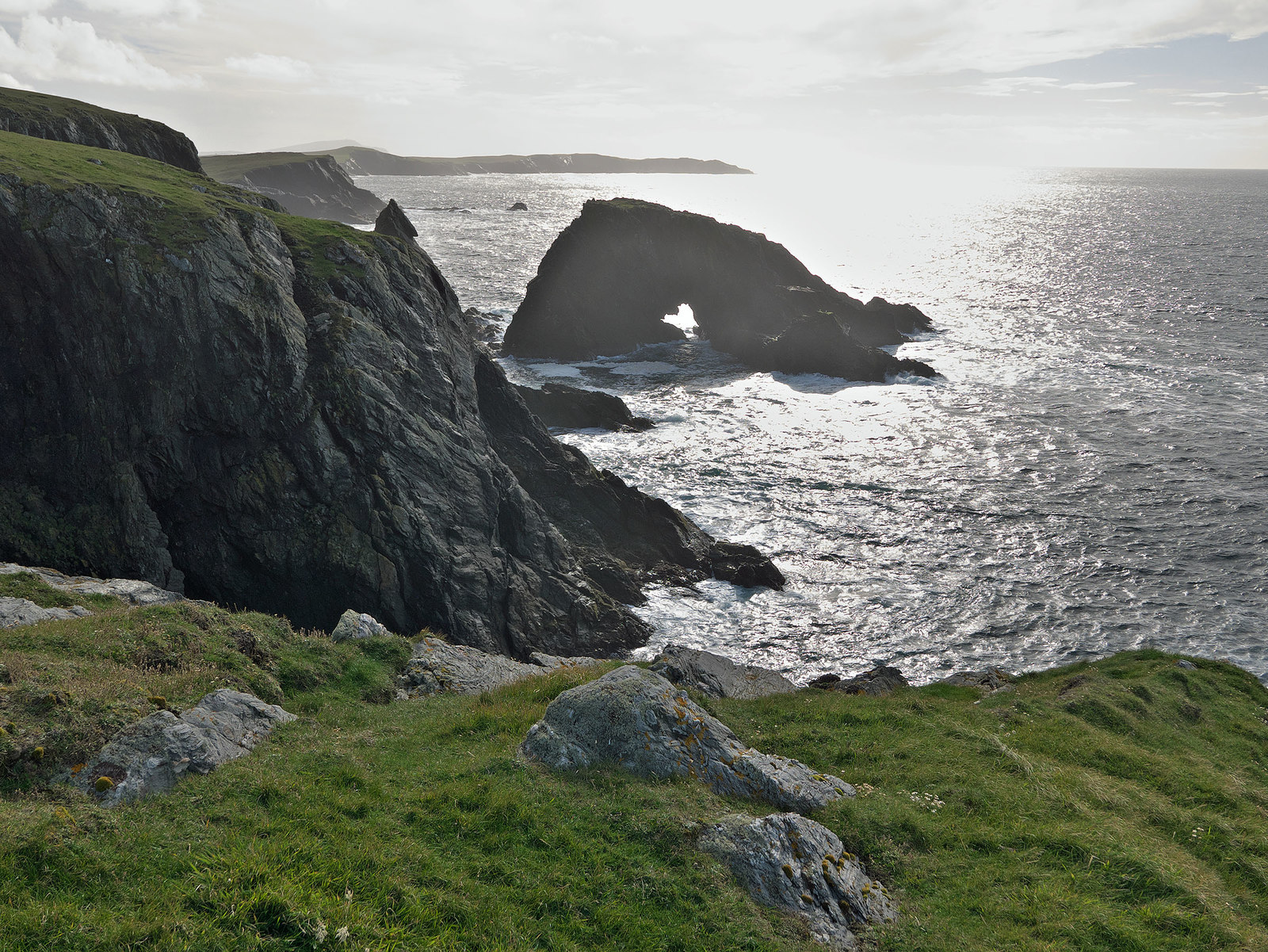
Stack of Sandwick, West Burra

- Stacks of Houssness at the south end of East Burra
- Fugla Stack, a 33m high stack west of The Ward, West Burra
- Clettnadel, a small stack just north of Fugla Stack
- Kame of Riven Noup, a "wafer-like entity" north of Clettnadel. The name may mean "comb of the torn headland" and is the subject of a poem by Martha Morton from Brae.
- Stack of Sandwick has an arch is and is located west of Bridge End, West Burra

==== Vaila ====
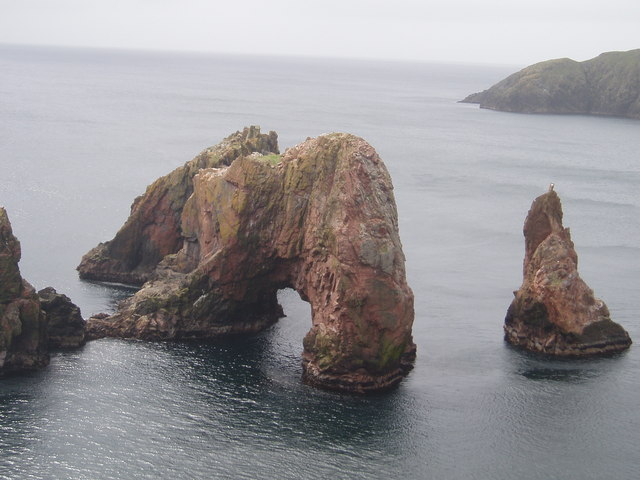
Gadda Stacks, Vaila

- Gaada Stacks
- Humla Stack

==== Papa Stour ====
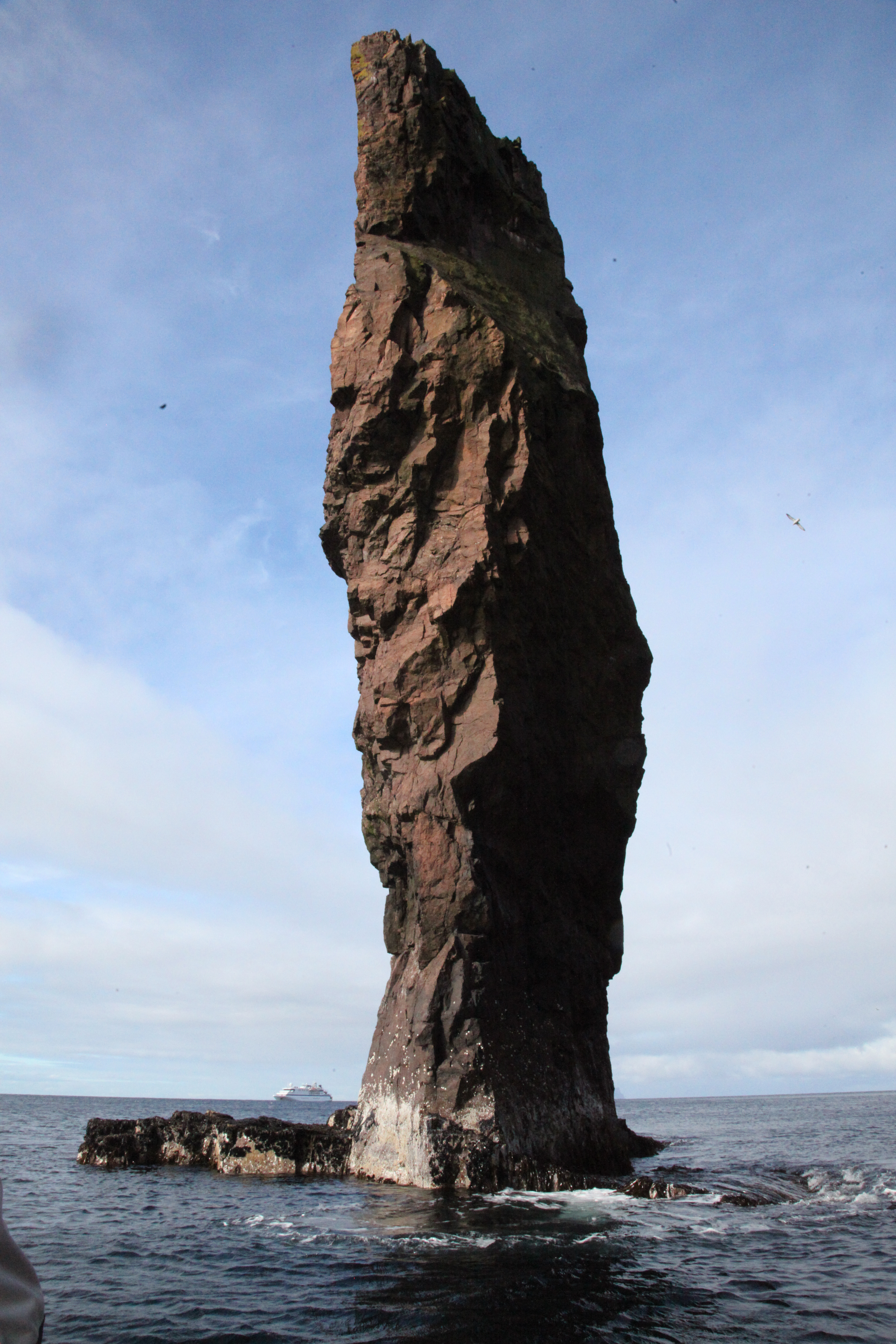
The Foot, also known as The Spindle, Papa Stour

- Lyra Skerry Stack
- Galti Stacks
- The Foot
- Snolda Stack No.

==== Vementry and Muckle Roe ====
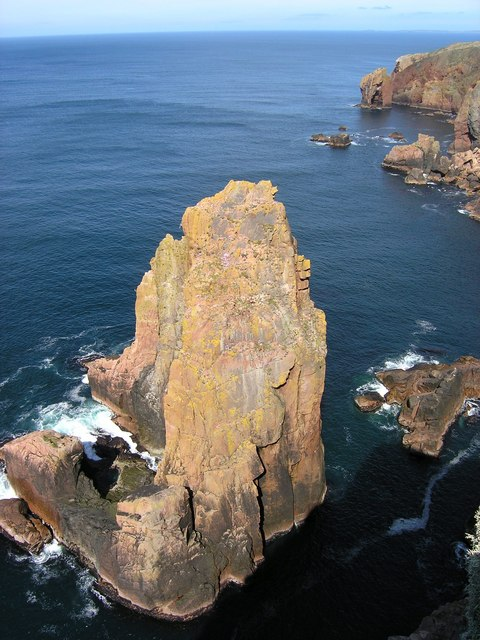
The Spindle, Muckle Roe

- Swaba Stack, Vementry
- Murbie Stacks, in the southwest of Muckle Roe
- Riding Stack, north of Murbie Stacks
- The Spindle, north of Riding Stack, off West Hill of Ham No.
- Da Kist, off Moo Ness (Note: Not named on Ordnance Survey maps.) No.
- Muckle Roe Stack, off Tame Holm (Note: Not named on Ordnance Survey maps.)
- Swabi Stack 46m high in the northwest of Muckle Roe

==== Fetlar ====
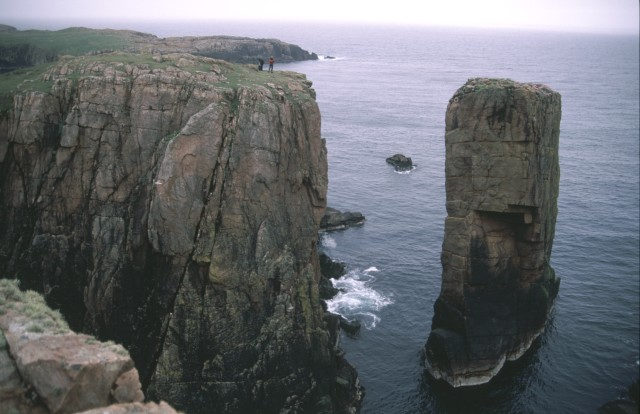
Muckle Roe Stack off Tame Holm, Muckle Roe

- Stack of Birrier
- Stacks of Scambro
- Furra Stacks
- Stackan Longa
- Bratta Stack
- Stack of Grunnigeo
- The Clett No.

==== Yell ====
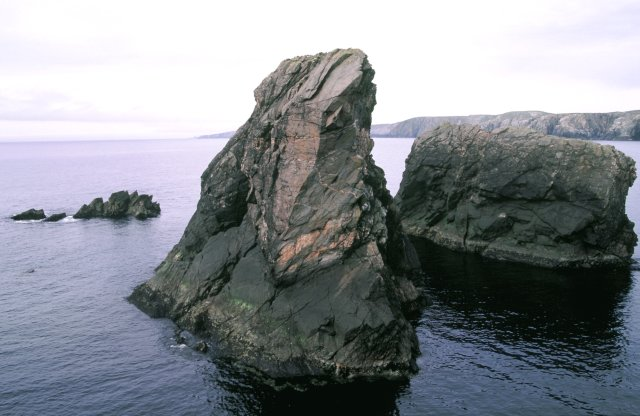
Stacks of Stuis, Yell

Ern Stack on the west coast is not a sea stack - see below.

- Sweinna Stack, north of Scattalands on the west coast
- Horns of the Roe, north of Sweinna Stack
- Whale Geo Stacks, north of Horns of the Roe
- Aastack, north of Whale Geo Stacks
- Stacks of Stuis, at the entrance of Whale Firth
- Aastack, south of Baagi Stack
- Baagi Stack, south of Whilkie Stack
- Whilkie Stack, by Gloup Holm
- Eagle Stack, by Gloup Holm
- Stack of the Horse, Burravoe

==== Unst ====
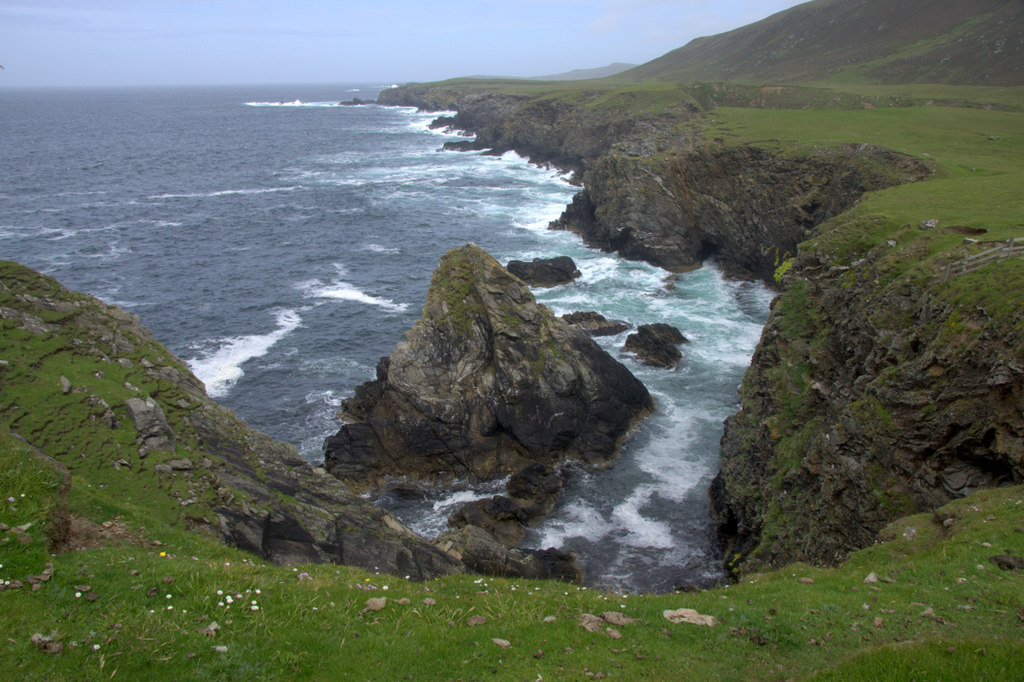
Unnamed stack at Ness of Collaster, Unst

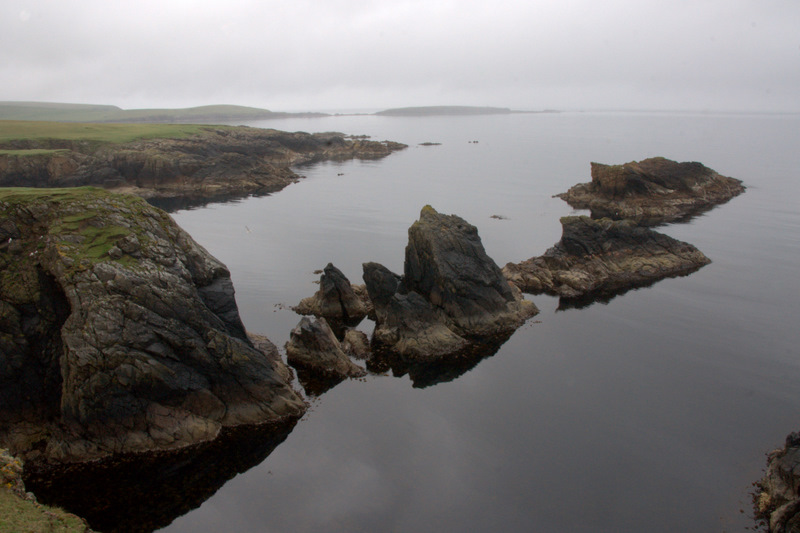
Cudda Stack, Unst

As with elsehere on Shetland the profusion of offshore islets and stacks create definitional problems. For example, The Greing north of Urda Stack is 53m high and is steeply sloping on one side and perpendicular cliffs on the other so not included. The name "stack" is also sometimes used for a headland, e.g. Sothers Stack, Hermaness or the nearby 55m high Humla Stack, which are included in Mellor's list of possible candidates or for rocky islets that come nowhere near meeting the definitions above e.g. Breiwick Stack, which is more of a skerry.

- Lamba Stack, a small stack north of Belmont
- Sinna Stack, west of Baltasound
- Gamli Stack, north of Sinna Stack
- Skate Stack, northwest of Gamli Stack
- Stacks of Poindie, north of Skate Stack
- Tonga Stack, off the Tonga headland west of Burrafirth
- Longa Stacks, close to Tonga Stack
- Neapna Stack, north of Longa Stacks, possibly exceeding 50m No.
- Tooa Stack, north of Neapna Stack No.
- Stackins-hocka, offshore from Tooa Stack. (Note: Mellor records this small stack as "Kame of Flouravoug" but as the name implies this is a headland.)
- Stackingro, off the west coast of Hermaness
- Flodda Stack, north of Stackingro
- Urda Stack, 35m high near the northern tip of Hermaness No.
- Burra Stack, with a natural arch and 44m high, north of Urda Stack
- Wilna Stack, at the northern tip of Hermaness No.
- Wurs Stack, Hermaness, a small stack next to an unnamed skerry
- Root Stacks, small stacks at the head of Burra Firth
- Holey Kame, a 29m stack northeast of Burrafirth No.
- Tooral Stack, a 27m stack north of Holey Kame No.
- Hinda Stack, a 21m stack north of Tooral Stack No.
- Whida Stack, Brei Wick, northeast of RAF Saxa Vord - two stacks one of which reaches 34m No.
- Gerva Stacks, east of Brei Wick - two stacks one of which reaches 31m No.
- Cudda Stack, a small stack near the headland of North Coos, north of Nor Wick
- Stack of Louin, east of Norwick
- Stack of Russalore, west of Stack of Louin
- North Stane, 28m high and east of the village of Saxa Vord No.
- Ship Stack, south of North Stane
- Hagmark Stack, 21m high and south of Ship Stack

==== Muckle Flugga ====
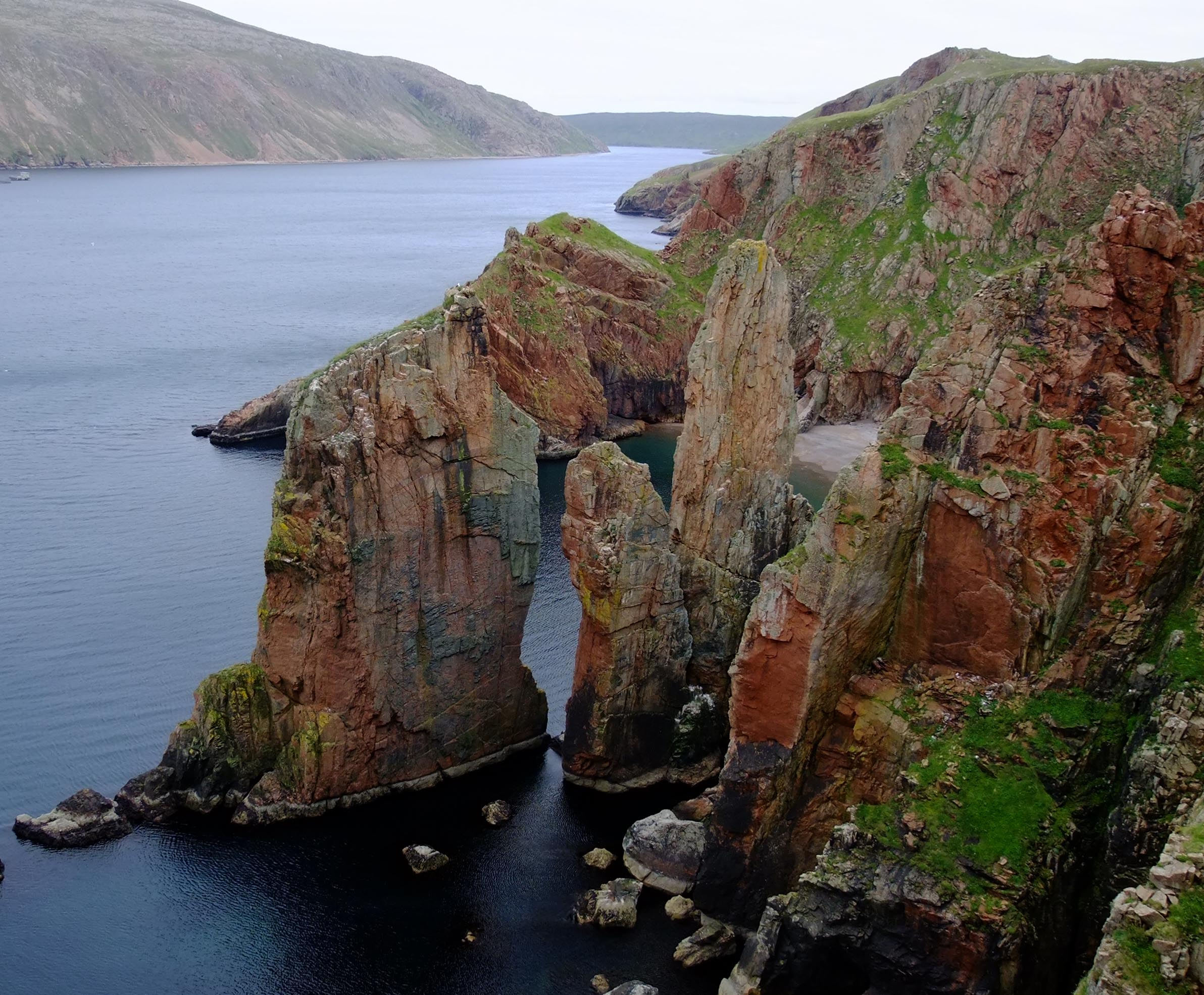
Point of Quida-stack, Ronas Voe, Northmavine

- Muckle Flugga comes equipped with a lighthouse but has had "many ascents"
- Little Flugga reaches 31m No.
- Vesta Skerry reaches 48m No.

==== Foula ====
- Gaada Stack
- Da Stacs o' Logat
- Rippack Stack

=== Shetland mainland ===
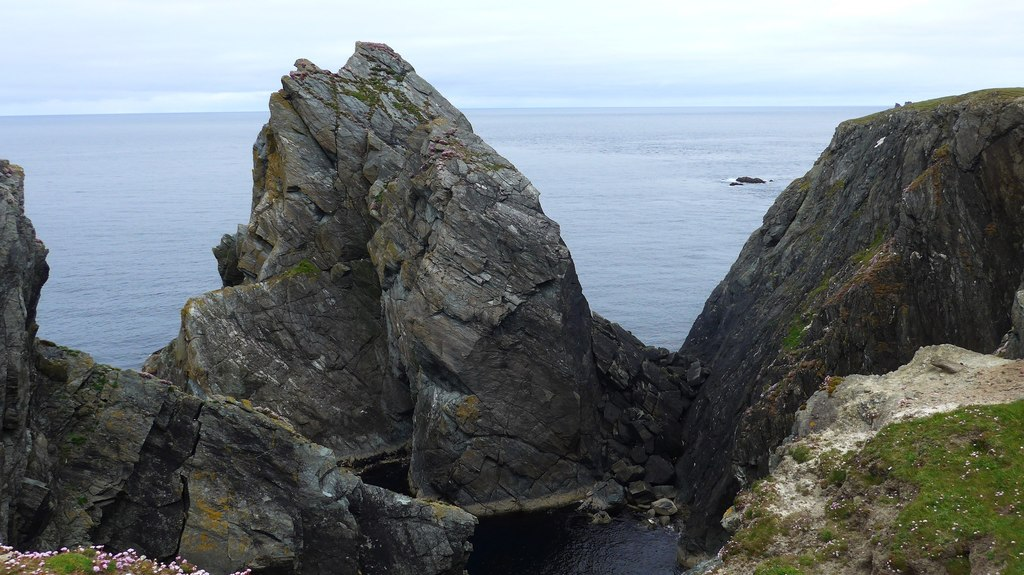
Yellow Stack at Point of Fethaland, Northmavine

==== Northmavine ====
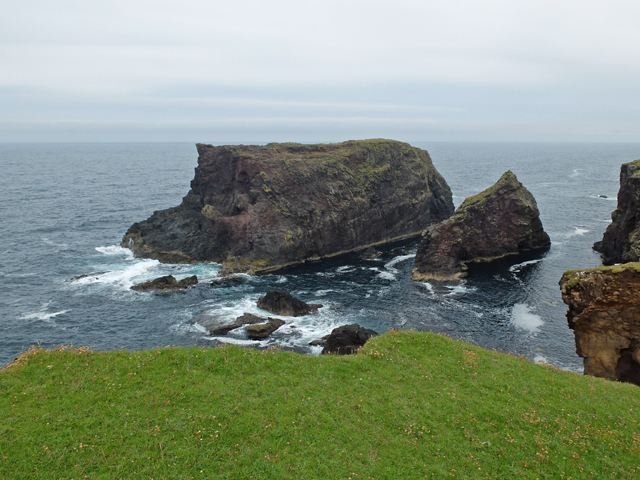
One of several 'Moo Stacks' off the mainland Shetland coast

- Moo Stack, off Esha Ness
- Stack of Sumra, Ronas Voe
- Galti Stack, just off The Faither, Ronas Voe
- Point of Quida-stack, Ronas Voe
- Gruna Stack and Little Gruna Stacks, north of Ronas Voe
- Galti Stack, east of Uyea
- Out Shuna Stack, west of Uyea
- Yellow Stack, 45m high at Point of Fethaland
- Stuack, Point of Fethaland
- Bark Stack, Point of Fethaland
- Ramna Stacks, north of Point of Fethaland
- Outer Stack, north of Ramna Stacks
- Stack of Stavgeo, Yell Sound
- Stack of the Rettuvie, Yell Sound
- Stack of the Crubb, Yell Sound
- The Castle, Yell Sound
- Trolla Stack, Yell Sound

==== Nesting and South Mainland ====
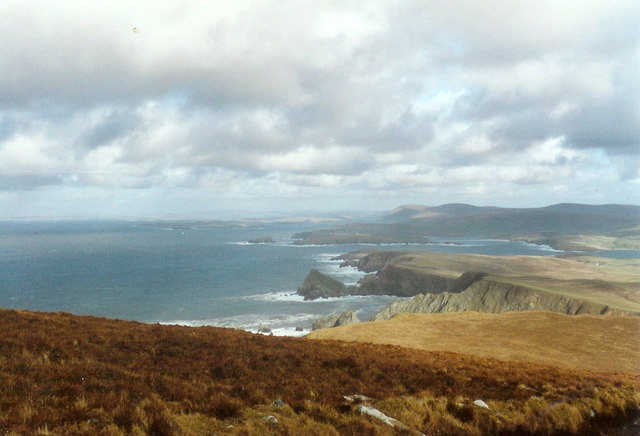
Wick of Shunni and Landvillas, near Loch of Spiggie

- Ura Stack, near the farm of Neap
- Fru Stack, off Moul of Eswick
- Hoo Stack, about a mile offshore from Moul of Eswick
- Stacks of Vatsland, north of Gremista, Lerwick
- Holm of Noss - unnamed stack c. 50m high.
- Punds Stack off Ness of Trebister, south of Lerwick
- Quarff Stack, by Quarff
- Coall Head Stacks, south of Quarff
- Stack of Okraquoy, near Falddabister
- Stack of Billyageo, off No Ness, south of Mousa
- Stack of the Brough, Boddam
- Stack of Otter Geo, east of Sumburgh Airport
- Broad Stack, west of Sumburgh Airport
- Ripack Stack, close to Broad Stack
- Landvillas, Wick of Shunni
- Clocki Stack, northwest of Loch of Spiggie

==== Wester Wick ====
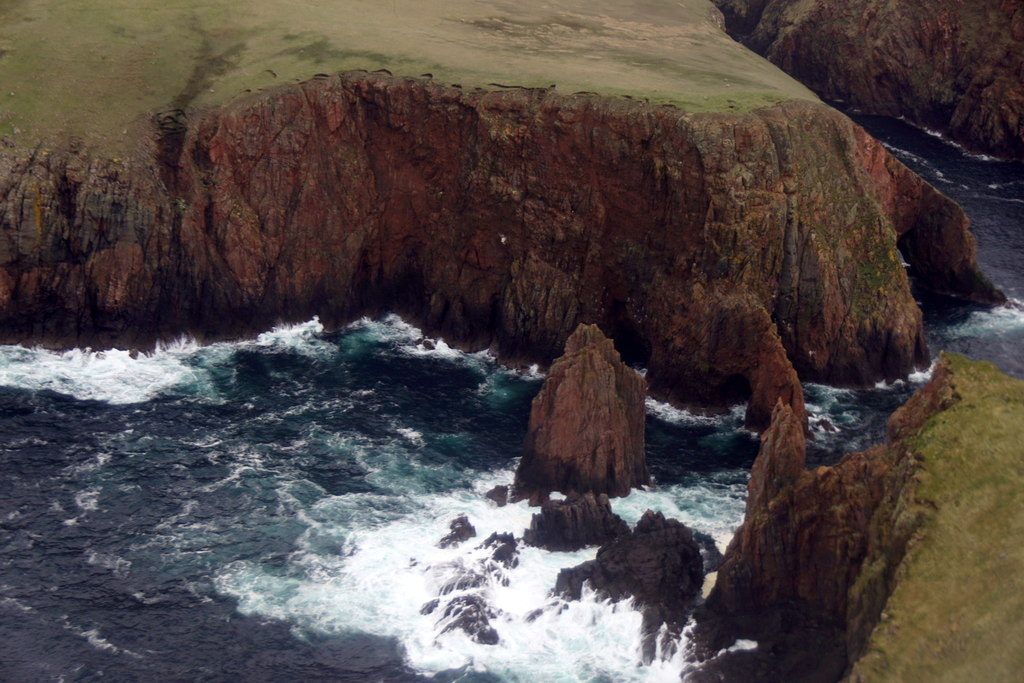
The Cutter, between the islet of Giltarump and mainland Sandsting

- Moo Stack, south of Skeld
- Berga Stack, Sil Wick No.
- Skerry of the Wick, 35m high No.
- Westwick Stacks, including Gro Stack in the bay of Wester Wick
- Grossa Stack, Wester Wick No.
- The Cutter, a 31m ascent
- Groni Stack, a 46m stack just north of The Cutter No.
- Burga Stacks, southwest of Culswick
- Seli Stack, northwest of Culswick in Gruting Voe

==== Walls and Sandness ====
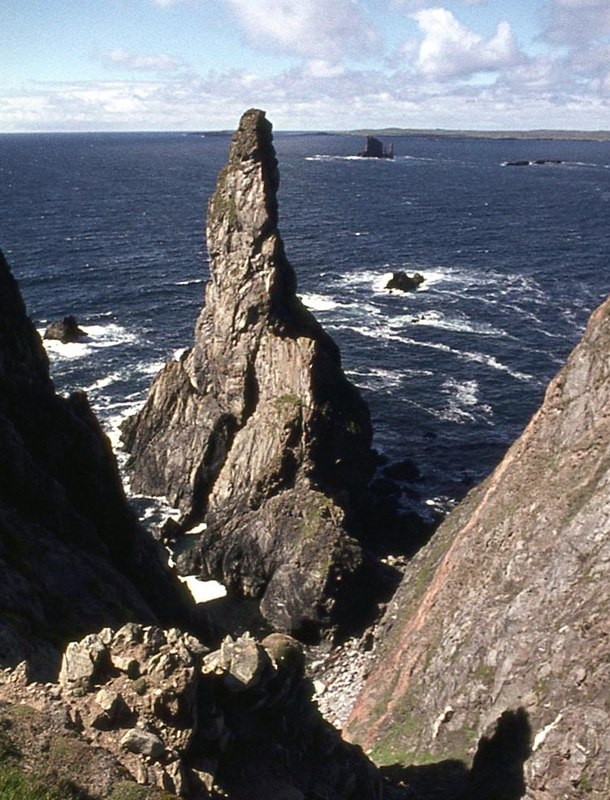
The 50m high Gordi Stack, St Magnus Bay

- Lang Stack, a 50m stack northwest of Dales
- West Stack, west of Mid Walls
- Rusna Stacks, at the entrance to Vaila Sound
- Litla Stack, in the Bay of Deepdale

==== West Burra Firth ====
- Lang Stack, off Snarra Ness
- Galta Stack
- Swaaba Stack No.
- Turl Stack, east of Isle of West Burrafirth

==== St Magnus Bay (north) ====
- Gordi Stack, south of Hillswick, which is 50m high
- Oe Stack, south of the Isle of Nibon
- Moo Stack, north of Eina Stack
- Eina Stack, 30m high, northwest of Mavis Grind

== Places called "stack" etc. that are not sea stacks ==
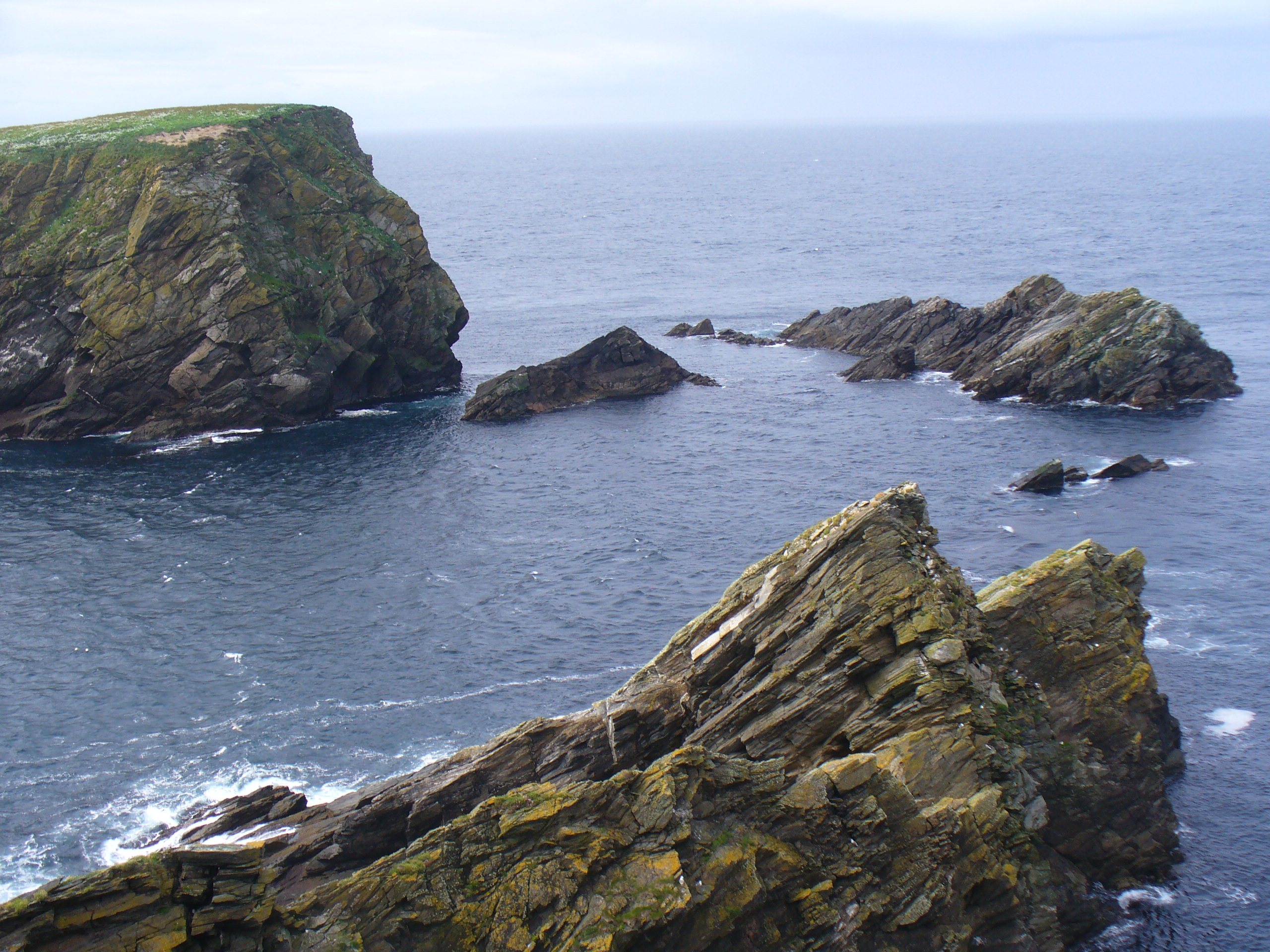
Stack of the Ship, St Ninian's Isle in the foreground with Hich Holm and Fora Stack beyond

- Brough of Deerness is a wide stack "connected to the coast at beach level".
- Erne Stack on Muckle Roe is "connected to the shore by a thin neck".
- Ern Stack, Yell is a prominent feature with twin towers of white rock first climbed in 1980. It is also the last recorded nesting site of the Eurasian sea eagle in Shetland. However it is not sea-encircled.
- Leac Mhina Stack (Ledge of Mina Stack) is a headland on the east coast of Hirta facing Mina Stack.
- The Old Man of Storr is an inland pinnacle on Skye.
- Stac a’ Langa is a narrow promontory at the foot of the cliffs of eastern Hirta.
- Stac Dhomhnuill Chaim, Mangersta, is circa 50m high but joined to Lewis by a narrow spine of rock.
- Stack of the Ship, which is attached to St Ninian's Isle by a "a knife-edged arête".
- Stac Pollaidh is a hill in Sutherland.

== See also ==
- Geography of Scotland
