= Mina Stac =

Sea stack in St Kilda, Scotland

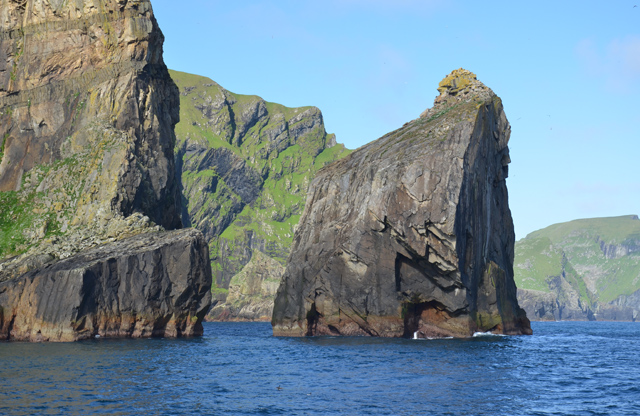
- Interactive map of Mina Stac

Geography
- Location: St Kilda
- OS grid reference: NA105007
- Type: Sea stack
- Archipelago: St Kilda
- Adjacent to: Hirta
- Highest elevation: 70 m (230 ft)

Mina Stac is a sea stack in the St Kilda archipelago, Outer Hebrides. It lies directly below the cliffs of Hirta and stands 70 metres tall. The name is possibly from the Old Norse minni-stakkr, or possibly from the Scottish Gaelic mìn.

== History ==
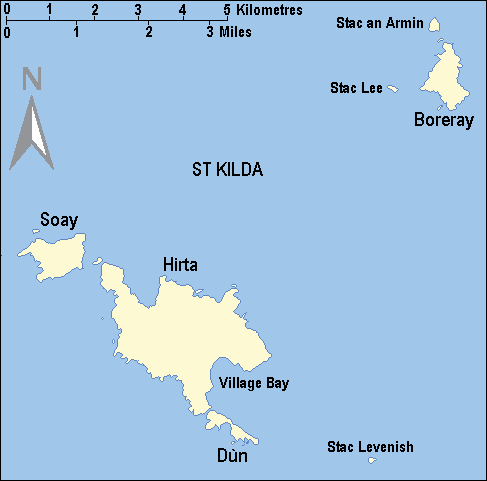
Map of the St Kilda archipelago

The stack has never been inhabited but has contributed to the local economy by supplying the St Kildans with sea birds and their eggs. In the 19th century the St Kildans were observed collecting eggs from here in baskets like flat-bottomed bee hives, each of 17 baskets holding about 400 guillemot eggs.

Mina Stac, along with the adjacent Bradastac, was specifically used by St. Kildans to collect fulmars and their eggs. To do this St. Kildans would lower themselves on ropes over the cliffs of Conachair, the highest point of Hirta and the archipelago. They would then abseil down the cliffs and onto Mina Stac, collecting fulmars and their eggs as they went, which they then brought back up the cliffs in baskets.

== Geology ==
Mina Stac is a remnant of a massive Palaeogene ring volcano that was active approximately 55 to 60 million years ago. It is composed of igneous breccia.
