= Am Plastair =

Island in St Kilda, Scotland

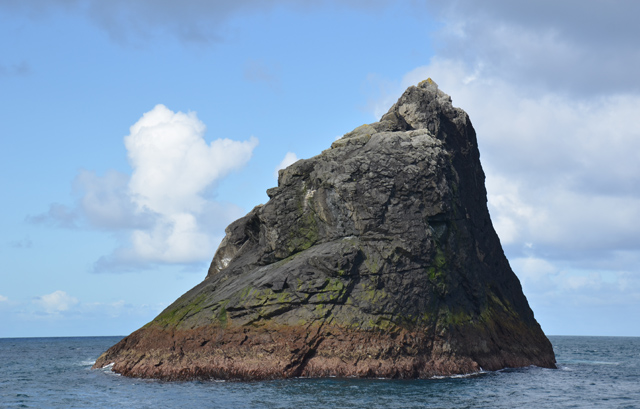
- Am Plastair seen from Soay
- Interactive map of Am Plastair

Geography
- Location: Atlantic Ocean
- OS grid reference: NA059020
- Archipelago: St Kilda
- Adjacent to: Soay
- Area: 0.58 ha (1.4 acres)
- Highest elevation: 42 m (138 ft)

Am Plastair is a sea stack in the St Kilda archipelago, in the council area of the Outer Hebrides, Scotland. It is 42 metres (138 ft) tall and is situated to the north of the island of Soay. The stack has a 40-metre (131-foot) underwater tunnel that runs directly through the rock, starting at 24 metres deep on the north side and rising to just 4 metres deep on the south. The stack is 42 meters (136ft) tall with an area of 0.58 ha (1.4 acres).

== Etymology ==
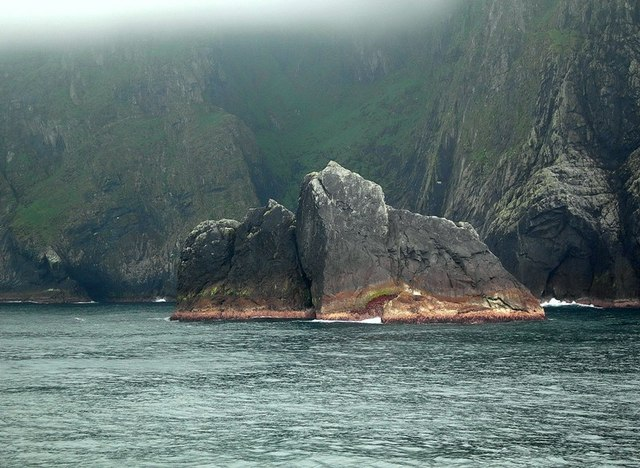
Am Plastair with Soay in the background

The Gaelic name Am Plastair literally translates to "The Plaster". This may describe the physical appearance of the rock, specifically how it appears to be "plastered" against the cliffs of Soay. The name Am Plastair may also mean "the rascal" from the Scottish Gaelic peallastair.

== History ==
Am Plastair was, like other stacks in the archipelago, used for harvesting seabirds and eggs. These stacks were climbed by St. Kildans, who climbed alpine-style in order to collect seabird eggs and seabirds.

The stack was known to have a fast tide race between this stack and Soay which "can make boating rather hazardous".

== See also ==
- List of sea stacks in Scotland
- List of islands of Scotland
