= Am Buachaille =

Sea stack in Highland, Scotland

Am Buachaille (Gaelic)
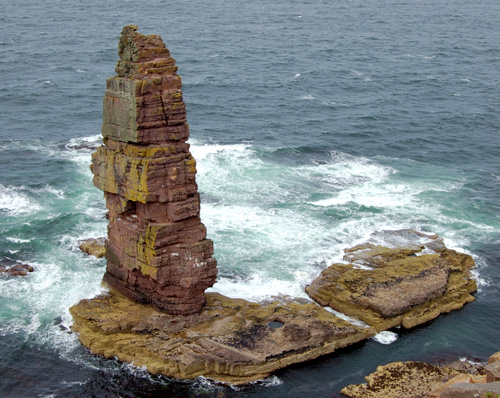

Location
- Am Buachaille shown within Highland Scotland
- OS grid reference: NC201652
- Coordinates: 58.5374°N 5.0918°W

Name
- Name meaning: The Herdsman

Physical geography
- Highest elevation: 65 m (213 ft)

Administration
- Country: Scotland
- Sovereign state: United Kingdom

Am Buachaille is a sea stack, or vertical rock formation composed of Torridonian Sandstone, 1 mile (1.5 kilometres) southwest of Sandwood Bay in the Scottish county of Sutherland. It lies at the tip of the Rubh' a Bhuachaille headland around 5 miles (8 kilometres) north of Kinlochbervie.

The stack is 65 metres (213 feet) high and was first climbed in 1968 by the mountaineers Tom Patey, Ian Clough and John Cleare. At least four climbing routes are identified on Am Buachaille which is considered a "famous" sea stack climb and has been called the "most serious of 'the big three' Scottish stacks" and a "truly great stack". The easiest route is graded Hard Very Severe (HVS) and access to the stack involves a 30-metre (100-foot) swim at low tide.

In September 2024 Jim Miller, Alan Thurlow along with Aden Thurlow 11 years old, who lead climbed the route to the top, became the youngest person to lead the climb on Am Buachaille.

The name means "the herdsman" or "the shepherd" in Scottish Gaelic.

== See also ==
- List of sea stacks in Scotland
