= South Isle of Gletness =

Island in United Kingdom

Coordinates: 60°14′N 1°09′W

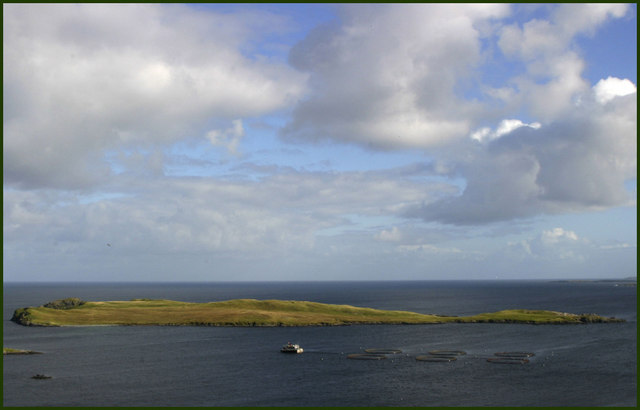
South Isle of Gletness

The South Isle of Gletness is an islet off Gletness, in Nesting in east central, Mainland, Shetland. It is 30m at its highest point.

Amongst its features are some caves.

The North Isle of Gletness is nearby.

== See also ==
- List of islands of Scotland
