= Fethaland =

Coordinates: 60.63°N 1.32°W

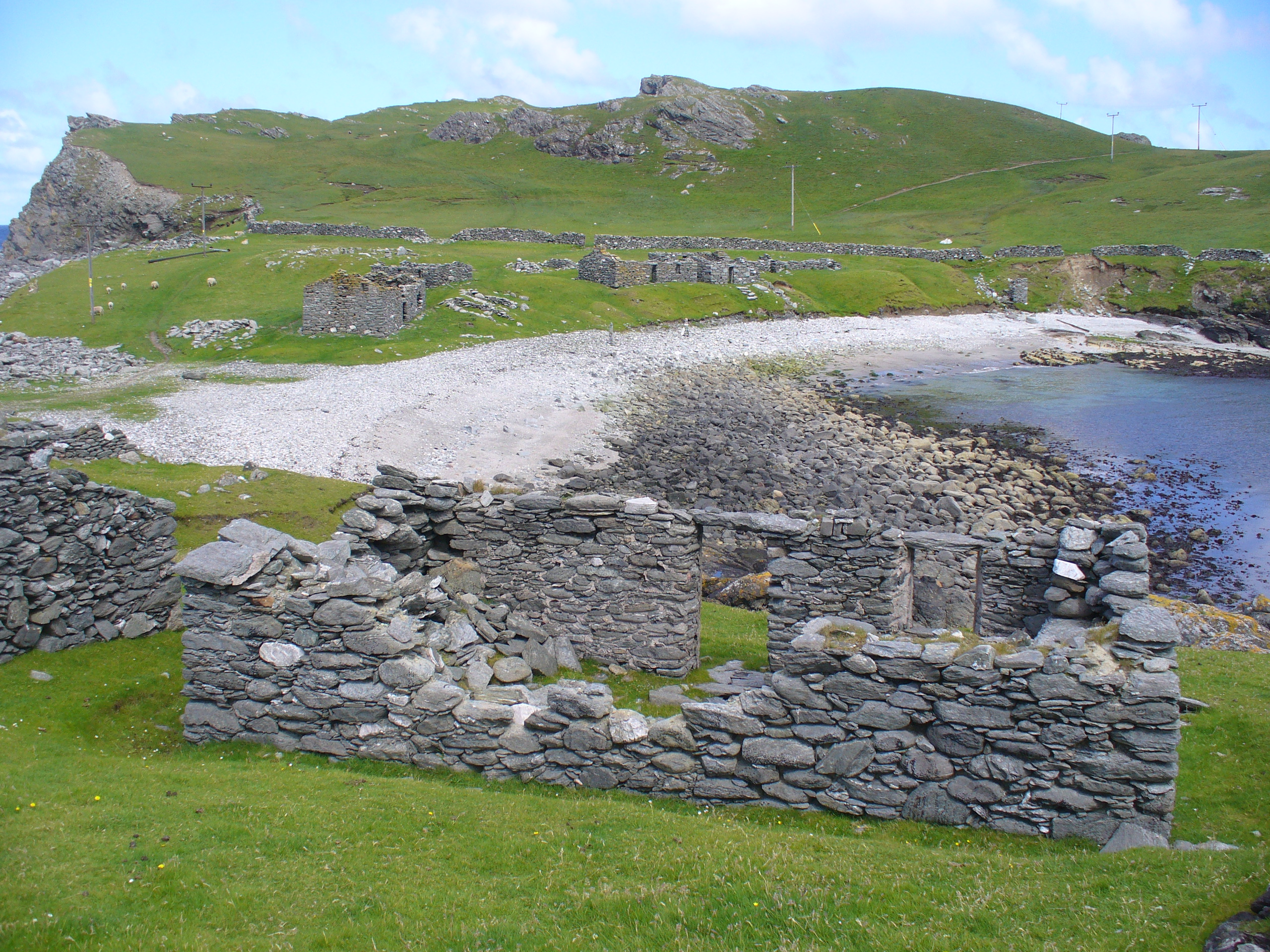
- Ruined fisherman's böds, Fethaland.

- Location within Shetland
- Language: Shetland Dialect
- OS grid reference: HU373939
  - Edinburgh: 330 mi (530 km) SSW
  - London: 632 mi (1,017 km) S
- Civil parish: Northmavine
- Council area: Shetland
- Lieutenancy area: Shetland
- Country: Scotland
- Sovereign state: United Kingdom
- Post town: SHETLAND
- Postcode district: ZE2
- Dialling code: 01806
- Police: Scotland
- Fire: Scottish
- Ambulance: Scottish
- UK Parliament: Orkney and Shetland
- Scottish Parliament: Shetland
- Fethaland Lighthouse
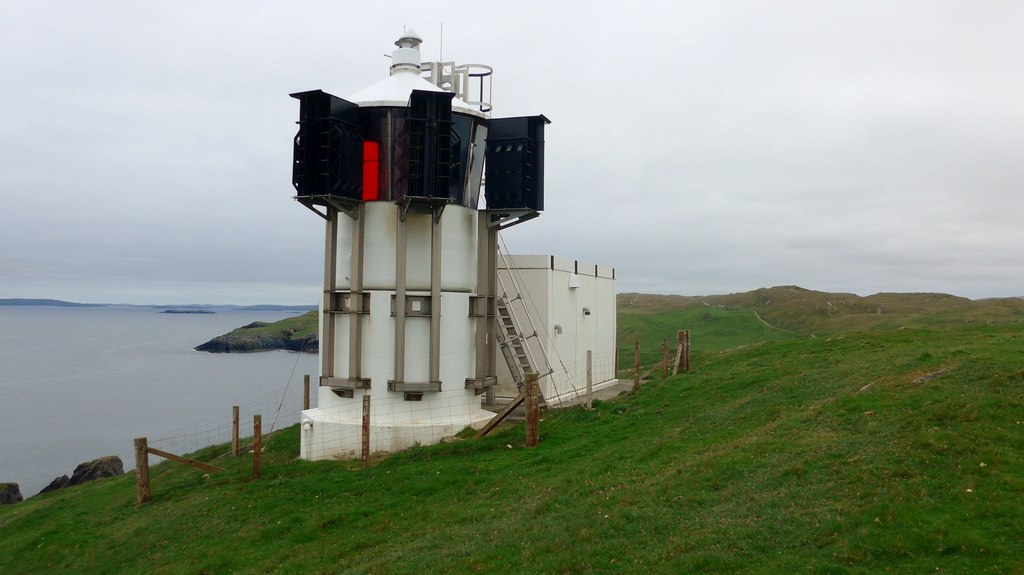
- Constructed: 1977
- Height: 7 m (23 ft)
- Shape: cylinder
- Markings: White
- Operator: Northern Lighthouse Board
- Focal height: 67 m (220 ft)
- Range: 19 nmi (35 km; 22 mi) (white), 15 nmi (28 km; 17 mi) (red)
- Characteristic: Fl(3) WR 15s

Fethaland or Fedeland (Note: Also variously spelled Fedaland, Fetheland, Feitheland, Fetchaland, and Phedeland) (Shaetlan pronunciation: [ˈfɛɪdələnd] FAID-ə-lənd) is an abandoned settlement at the extreme north end of Mainland, Shetland. It was the site of the largest Haaf fishing station in Shetland.

== Etymology ==
The name Fethaland derives from Old Norse and means rich pasture (literally "fat land"). There is a tradition that the name comes from the Picts who supposedly were forcibly removed from Fethaland, which was their last refuge. Upon being forced out to sea, they called out, "Fae da land, fae da land" (from the land), however this story is most likely apocryphal considering the shout is well-formed modern Shetland Dialect, which wouldn't have been spoken by the picts.

== Geography and geology ==
Fethaland, along with the more of the north tip of Mainland including Uyea is one part of the Shetland National Scenic Area. It is also a Site of Special Scientific Interest.

== Fishing station ==
Local man Douglas Murray describes the Fethaland fishing station

Oil lamps made from common whelk shells, (known locally as "buckies") were used by haaf fishermen in their böds. An example of one from Fethaland was collected by ethnographer Dr Arthur Mitchell and is kept in the Shetland Museum. Commenting on the lamp, Mitchell proposed,

...every one will admit that the lamp is elegant and pretty. Nothing, however, but the fact that it is easily obtained leads the deep-sea fisherman at his station on Fetheland Point to employ a shell for a [lamp]. His doing so does not prove the existence in him of a sense of the beautiful, nor, on the other hand, does his coarsely made sinker prove the reverse.

On 10 October 1994 the Fethaland fishing station was designated as a scheduled monument.

Due to the risk of erosion damaging the site a survey of the fishing station including the use of laser scanning took place in August 2010.

== Sources ==
- Blaeu, Willem Janszoon; Blaeu, Joan (1654). Orcadum et Schetlandiae Insularum accuratissima descriptio [An accurate description of the Isles of Orkney and Shetland] (Map) (in Latin). Amsterdam: Blaeu. p. 139 – via National Library of Scotland.
- Bruce, John (1745). Nieuwe paskaard van Hitland met de daar Omleggende Eylanden na de Nieuwe Aftekening Gemaakt by den Lofwaarden en Onvermoeyden Hit en Zeeman Ian Bruyst, wonende op Whalsay te Sambisterhuys, de Afpeylinge en Zeylaagien in alle Baayen en Plaatzen zyn door hem zelfs gedaan en om der zelver Nuttigheyt int Licht gebragt diir Reinier en Josua Ottens Kaartverkopers te Amsterdam [New Shetland map with the surrounding islands, drawn by the praiseworthy and indefatigable Shetlander and seaman John Bruce, living in the isle of Whalsay at Symbister House, near the small sand bay, showing all the observations, gauges and sailing-routes in all bays and places there made by himself and for the sake of usefulness supports director Reinier and Josua Ottens map sellers in Amsterdam] (Map) (in Dutch). Shetland: Reinier en Josua Ottens Kaartverkopers te Amsterdam. p. 1 – via National Library of Scotland.
- Dixon, Magnus. "Haaf fishing in Shetland". NorthLink Ferries. Help from Davy Cooper.
- Dawson, Tom (August 2010). Milburn, Paula (ed.). "Fethaland Fishing Station" (PDF). The Journal of Archaeology Scotland. New Series. 11: 158–159. Archived from the original (PDF) on 21 January 2022.
- Hibbert, Samuel (1891) [1822]. A Description of the Shetland Islands: Comprising an Account of Their Scenery, Antiquities, and Superstitions. Harvard University. Lerwick: T. & J. Manson.
- Jack, William (1999) [1794]. Sinclair, Sir John (ed.). "Northmaven". The Statistical Account of Scotland Drawn up from the Communications of the Ministers of the Different Parishes. 12 (27). University of Edinburgh, University of Glasgow: Edinburgh: William Creech: 351. OCLC 1045293275 – via The Statistical Accounts of Scotland online service.
- Jakobsen, Jakob (1897). "The old Shetland place-names". The dialect and place names of Shetland; two popular lectures (Lecture). Cornell University Library. Lerwick: Lerwick, T. & J. Manson. p. 119. LCCN 03002186 – via archive.org.
- Manson, Thomas Mortimer Yule (1933). Mansons' Guide to Shetland (3rd ed.). Lerwick: T. & J. Manson. OCLC 1007883604.
- Preston, Thomas (1781). A new hydrographical survey of the islands of Shetland (Map). London: R. Sayer and J. Bennett. p. 1 – via National Library of Scotland.
- Renwick, Esther (16 January 2016). "In Depth - Steatite in Shetland". archaeologyshetland.
- Schrage, Bob (2 October 2018). "Point of Fethaland". enschrage.nl.
- Tait, Ian (June 2014). "Shedding light on the past" (PDF). Unkans (44): 3.
- Tudor, John R. (1883). The Orkneys and Shetland; their past and present state. Columbia University Libraries. London, E. Stanford; [etc., etc.]
- "Fedeland, fishing station and prehistoric house at Isle of Fethaland (SM6072)". portal.historicenvironment.scot.
- "Shetland NSA". sitelink.nature.scot.
- "Uyea - North Roe Coast SSSI". sitelink.nature.scot.
