= The Needle, Orkney =

Sea stack on the west of Hoy, Orkney Islands, Scotland

Coordinates: 58.7916°N 3.3132°W

The Needle is a 70-metre-high (230 ft) sea stack on the island of Hoy, in Orkney, Scotland. It is located on the southwest coast of Hoy at ND243902.

There is only one known rock climbing route, a grade XS 5c from the landward side, that was established by Mick Fowler and a team in 1991, which was described as "outrageous" in the 2020 guidebook to British sea-stack climbing routes.

== See also ==
- List of sea stacks in Scotland
