= Bradastac =

Sea stack in Scotland

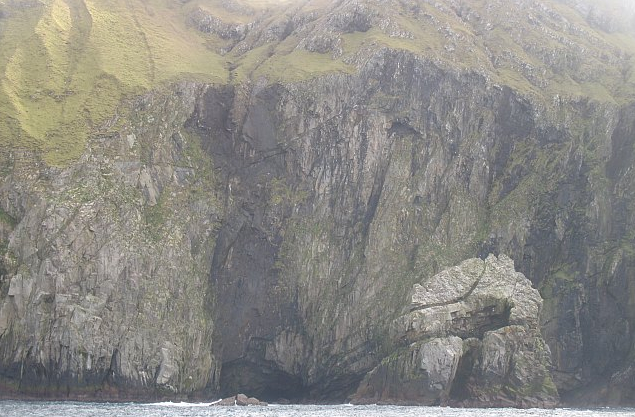
- Bradastac below the northern crags of Hirta
- Interactive map of Bradastac

Geography
- Location: St Kilda
- OS grid reference: NA105010
- Type: Stack
- Archipelago: St Kilda
- Highest elevation: 63 m (207 ft)

Bradastac (Scottish Gaelic: "Steep stack") is a sea stack in the St Kilda archipelago, Outer Hebrides, Scotland. It is just north of Hirta and has a height of 63 meters. The stack's name means "Steep stack" from Old Norse: bratti-stakkr.

== History ==
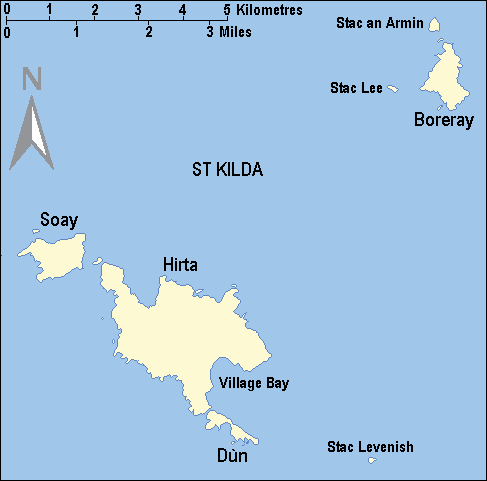
Map of The St Kilda archipelago

The stack has never been inhabited but has contributed to the local economy by supplying the St Kildans with sea birds and their eggs. In the 19th century the St Kildans were observed collecting eggs from stacks in baskets like flat-bottomed bee hives, each of 17 baskets holding about 400 guillemot eggs.

Bradastac was specifically used by St. Kildans to collect fulmars and their eggs. To do this St. Kildans would lower themselves on ropes over the cliffs of Conachair, the highest point of Hirta and the archipelago. They would then abseil down the cliffs and onto Bradastac, collecting fulmars and their eggs as they went, which they then brought back up the cliffs in baskets.

== Geography ==
Bradastac is located northwest of the summit of Conachair where the sheer cliffs fall into the sea from a height of 427 metres (1,401 ft). It has a height of 63 meters.

== Geology ==
Bradastac is made up of a medium-grained, cream-colored Conachair Granite, a leucogranite containing vapour-filled cavities or "druses", and containing quartz and feldspar, and is part of the St. Kilda Tertiary igneous complex. The stack is blocky, resulting from vertical and subhorizontal joints that developed as the granite cooled. The granite intruded into the older Mullach Sgar complex, and the junction between the two is seen in the high cliffs above the stack.

The stack is a remnant of a massive Palaeogene ring volcano that was active 55 to 60 million years ago.

== See also ==
- List of sea stacks in Scotland
