= Hoo Stack =

Hoo Stack Lighthouse
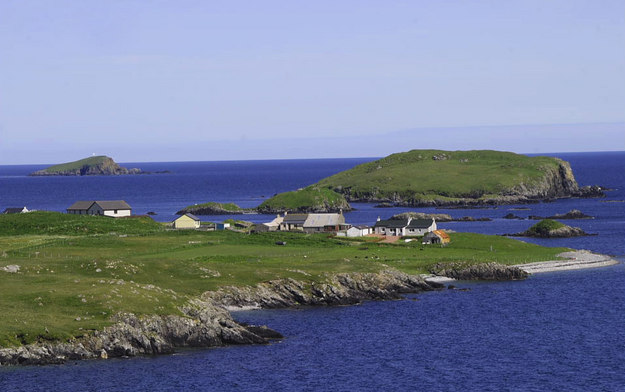
- Gletness with North Isle of Gletness in the foreground, and Hoo Stack in the background
- Location: Hoo Stack, Shetland, United Kingdom
- Coordinates: 60°14′57″N 1°05′22″W

Tower
- Constructed: 1986
- Foundation: concrete base
- Construction: metal skeletal tower
- Height: 8 m (26 ft)
- Shape: square tower covered by metallic panels with light on the top
- Markings: white (tower)
- Power source: solar power
- Operator: Northern Lighthouse Board

Light
- Focal height: 40 m (130 ft)
- Range: 7 nmi (13 km; 8.1 mi) (white), 5 nmi (9.3 km; 5.8 mi) (red, green)
- Characteristic: Fl(4) WRG 12s

Hoo Stack is a small island off Nesting in Shetland. It is one and a half miles from the North Isle of Gletness. It is 34 metres (112 ft) at its highest point, and is home to a lighthouse, which was built in 1986.

== See also ==
- List of lighthouses in Scotland
- List of Northern Lighthouse Board lighthouses
