= North Gaulton Castle =

Sea stack in Scotland

Coordinates: 59°0′2″N 3°21′58″W

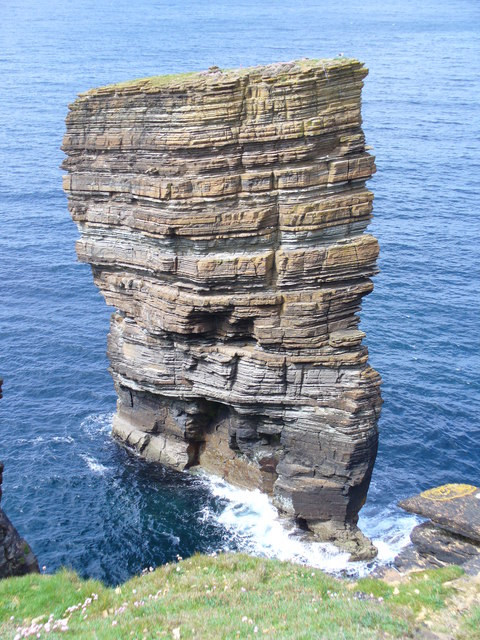

North Gaulton Castle is a sea stack off the western coast off the Orkney main island. It is formed from the red sandstone of the area and is about 165 feet high. It was climbed in 2017 by four climbers using a Tyrolean traverse.
