= Sandwood Bay =

Bay on the far north-west coast of mainland Scotland

- Bàgh Shanabhait (Scottish Gaelic)
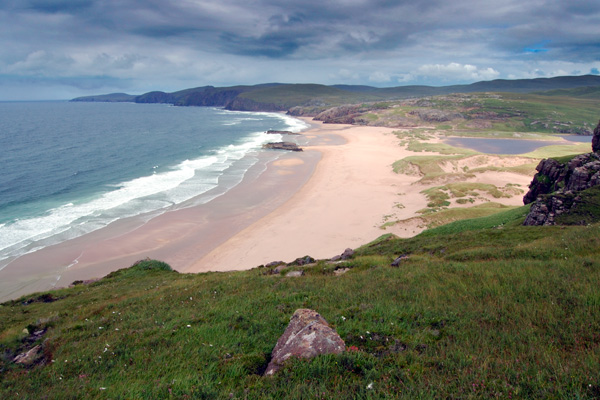
- Sandwood Bay – north view

- Location in Scotland
- Location: Scotland
- Coordinates: 58.5396°N 5.0623°W

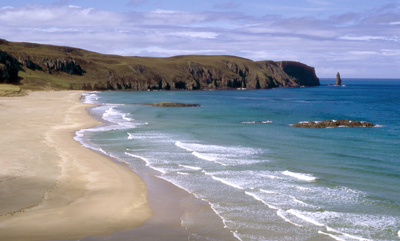
Sandwood Bay – south view

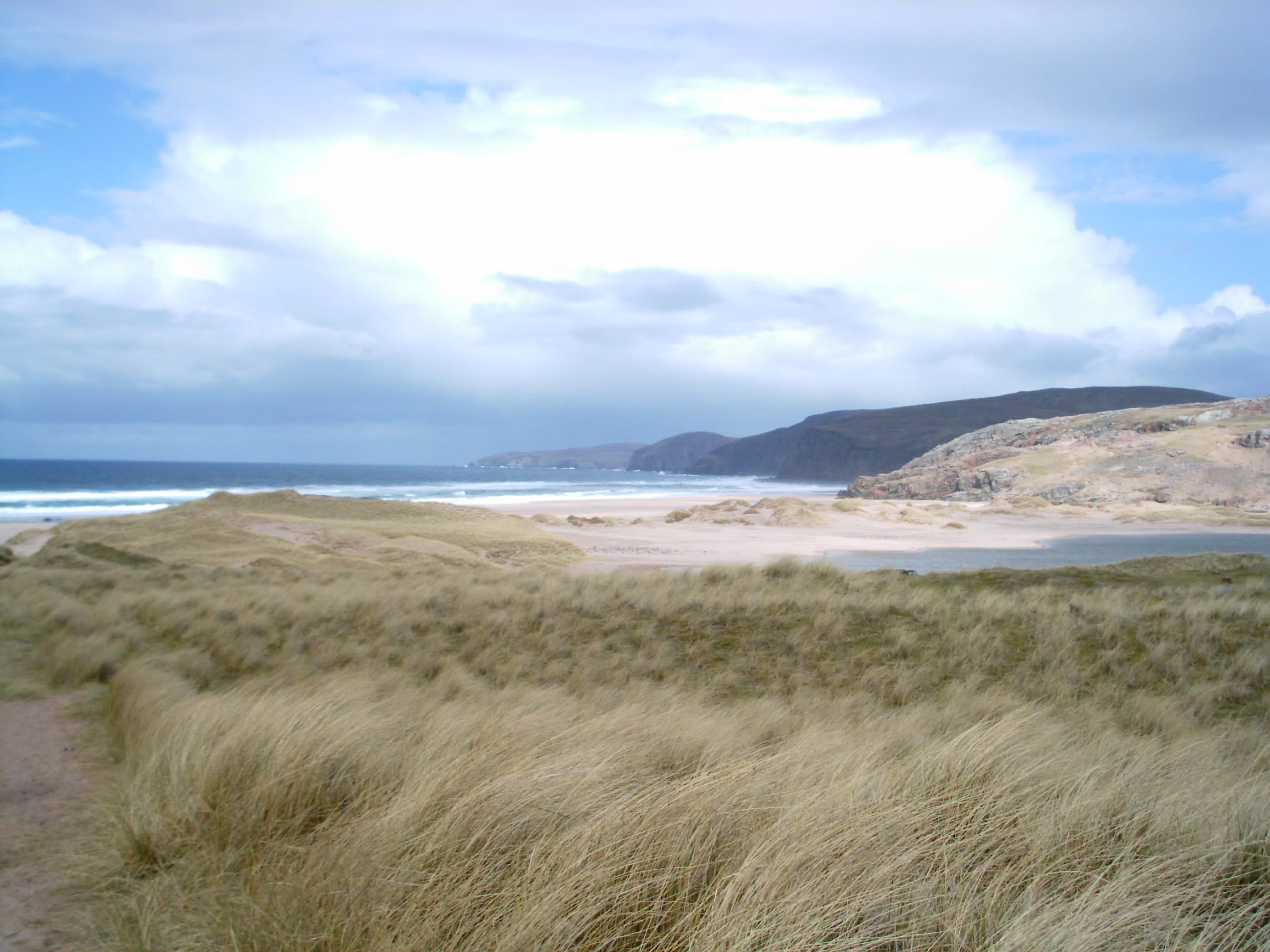
Sandwood Bay

Sandwood Bay (Scottish Gaelic: Bàgh Seannabhad) is a natural bay in Sutherland, on the far north-west coast of mainland Scotland. It is best known for its remote 1-mile-long (1.6 km) beach and Am Buachaille, a sea stack, and lies about 5 miles (8 kilometres) south of Cape Wrath. Behind the bay's large dunes, stretches the freshwater Sandwood Loch.

Though remote, and with no road access, the bay can be reached by a 4-mile (6-kilometre) path leading from the gravel car park at the hamlet of Blairmore. Sandwood Bay is part of the Sandwood Estate, which is run by the John Muir Trust. The beach is considered to be one of the cleanest and most unspoilt beaches in the whole of mainland Britain.

== History ==
The name Sandwood Bay probably derives from the Viking name 'Sandvatn' ("sand water") and it is believed longboats were dragged across the sands into Sandwood Loch. There are also remains of Pictish settlement in the area. The area has been largely uninhabited since 1847 when the land was cleared for sheep farming as part of the Highland Clearances. A number of shepherds huts remained and were occasionally occupied until around 1940. On 30 September 1941, Sergeant Michael Kilburn from 124 Squadron at RAF Castletown was flying a Spitfire south west of Cape Wrath when the engine failed. He crash-landed the plane on the beach at Sandwood, and managed to escape uninjured. The wreck remained on the beach and over time the entire bodywork was eroded away by the sea but its engine, a Rolls-Royce Merlin, remains largely intact and occasionally emerges into full view whenever tidal and weather conditions permit.

The farmstead of Strathchailleach, around 1 mile (2 kilometres) east of the bay, was built in the mid 19th century. This was occupied by James MacRory-Smith, a hermit known as Sandy, from 1962 to 1994. Both Strathchailleach and a similar cottage at Strathan, 3 miles (5 kilometres) south-east of the bay, are operated as bothies by the Mountain Bothies Association.

In June 2009 a microlight plane crash landed on the beach; the pilot Keith Brown escaped injury. The plane then had to be dismantled and carried 4 miles (6 kilometres) to the nearest road by a team of 14 men.

== Legends ==
Because of its isolation, the bay has become distinctly romanticised with several legends accorded to it. One legend tells of a mermaid spotted on one of the two jutting rocks there a hundred years ago. Alexander Gunn, a local farmer, was on the beach, searching for one of his sheep, when his dog made a startling discovery. One man, MacDonald Robertson, often spoke of the time he met Mr Gunn in 1939. This is what he reported: "On 5th January 1900 ... Gunn's collie suddenly let out a howl and cringed in terror at his feet. On a ledge, above the tide, a figure was reclining on the rock face. At first he thought it was a seal, then he saw the hair was reddish-yellow, the eyes greenish-blue and the body yellowish and about 7 feet (2.1 metres) long. To the day Alexander Gunn died in 1944, his story never changed and he maintained that he had seen a mermaid of ravishing beauty."

Another legend tells of the ghost of a sailor that would often knock on the windows of the old cottage (now a bothy) on stormy nights – apparently the victim of a shipwreck there. Indeed, before the Cape Wrath lighthouse was built in 1828, the bay is said to have played host to many a shipwreck – all of which still lie buried under the sand. In the 1920s, author Seton Gordon witnessed many submerged wrecks in the sand while walking here. In a book he wrote in 1935, "Highways & Byways in the West Highlands", he says: "I was astonished at the number of wrecks which lie on the fine sand of this bay. All of them are old tragedies: since the placing of a lighthouse on Cape Wrath just over a hundred years ago, no vessel has been lost here. Some of the vessels lie almost buried in the sand far above the reach of the highest tide". He also commented on the possibility of there being Viking longboats buried there, since Sandwood Bay had been used by the Vikings as a stopover point a thousand years previous.

In 2017, the supernatural associations of Sandwood Bay were featured in an episode of the six-part STV series "Beyond Explanation" presented by Scottish actor Brian Cox.

== In popular culture ==
In January 2018 Scottish fiddle player Duncan Chisholm released his sixth solo album, inspired by Sandwood Bay, entitled Sandwood. In December of the same year the Scots Trad Music Awards named the album their album of the year. Duncan Chisholm participated in a subsequent podcast hosted by Matthew Bannister as part of his "Folk on Foot" broadcasts, in which folk musicians revisit specific geographic locations that have inspired them in their creative works. Chisholm took Bannister to Sandwood Bay to discuss how this affected him in the making of his 2018 album.
