= North Isle of Gletness =

Coordinates: 60°14′37″N 1°8′16″W

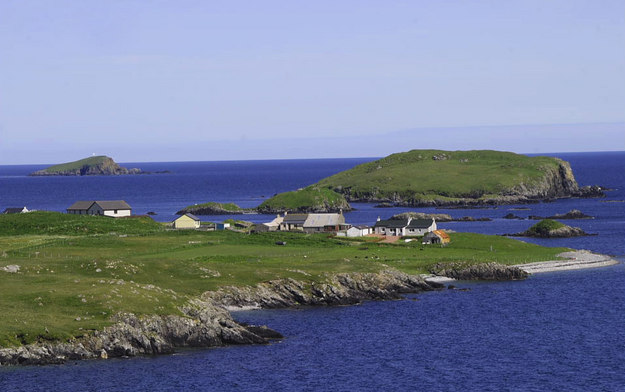
Gletness with North Isle of Gletness in the foreground, and Hoo Stack in the background

The North Isle of Gletness is one of the Shetland Islands. It is east of the Shetland Mainland, near Gletness in Nesting parish, and is so called in contradistinction to the South Isle of Gletness. It is 33m at its highest point.

There are several small skerries surrounding it.
