= Uyea, Northmavine =

Uninhabited tidal island located to the northwest of Mainland, Shetland

Uyea
Öya (Scots)
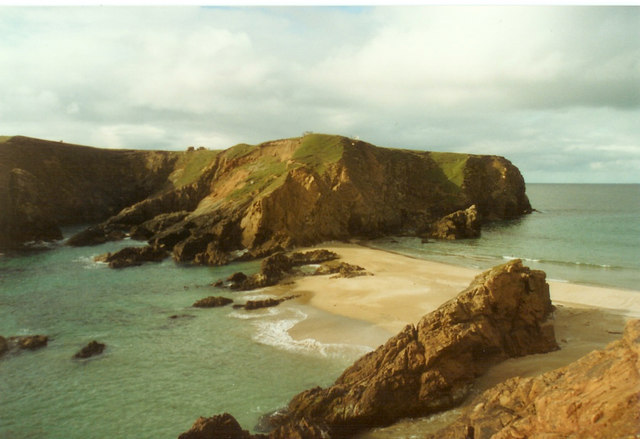
- Uyea showing the connecting beach.

Location
- Uyea shown within Shetland
- OS grid reference: HU313929
- Coordinates: 60.62°N 1.43°W

Name
- Name meaning: possibly Old Norse for "island of the sacred place". Island beside the pasture land.
- Old Norse name: Øyja

Physical geography
- Island group: Shetland
- Area: 45 ha (0.17 sq mi)
- Area rank: 205=
- Highest elevation: 70 m (230 ft)

Administration
- Council area: Shetland Islands
- Country: Scotland
- Sovereign state: United Kingdom

Demographics
- Population: 0

Uyea (Scots: Öya in Shetlandic) is an uninhabited tidal island located to the northwest of Mainland, Shetland. Uyea lies off the Northmavine peninsula, from where it can be reached by foot at low tide. The island's highest elevation is 70 metres (230 ft) and its area is 45 hectares (0.17 sq mi).

There are several natural arches on its rocky coast, as well as challenging rock climbs. Surrounding skerries include Big Nev, Dorra Stack, Little Nev, Out Shuna Stack, Robert Irvine's Skerry, and The Burrier.

== See also ==
- Uyea, Unst
