= List of outlying islands of Scotland =

Island List

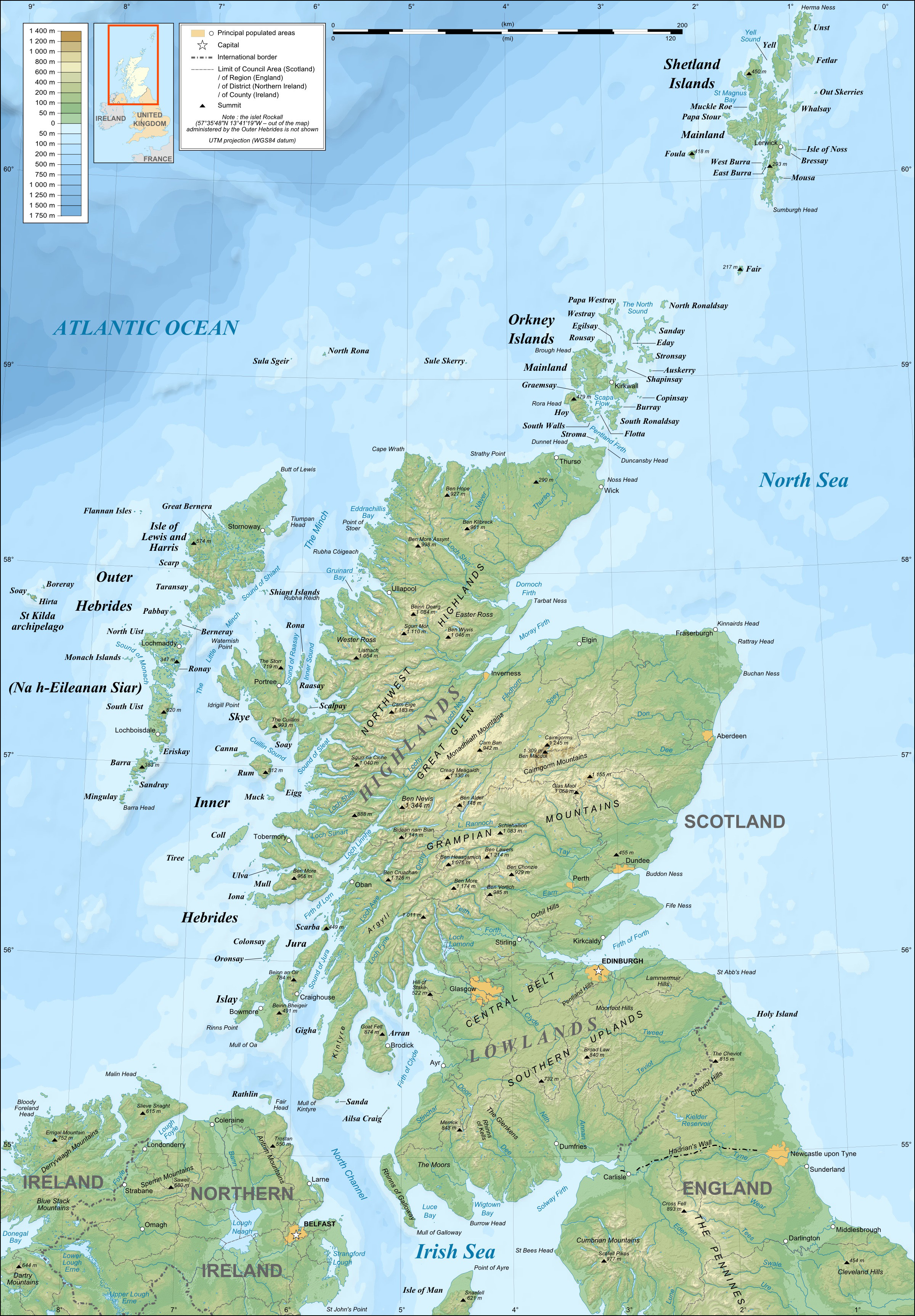
Topographic map of Scotland

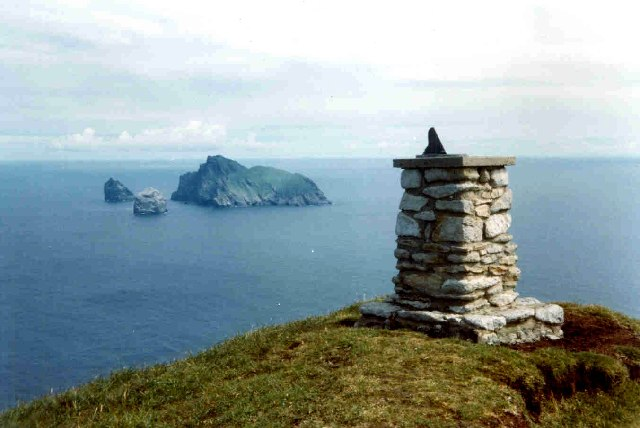
Boreray and the stacks from the heights of Conachair, Hirta

The outlying islands of Scotland are not part of the larger archipelagos and island groups of Scotland—the Hebrides, the Northern Isles or the Islands of the Forth and Clyde estuaries. Only one of these islands is currently inhabited - Buchan Ness - and few of them ever were, although Hirta was occupied from the Neolithic age until 1930 and Stroma was permanently occupied until the 1970s and thereafter by lighthouse keepers and their families until 1996. Several other outlying islands have lighthouses, none of which is still staffed.

In this list, an island is defined as "land that is surrounded by seawater on a daily basis, but not necessarily at all stages of the tide, excluding human devices such as bridges and causeways". (Note: Various other definitions are used in the Scottish context. For example, the General Register Office for Scotland define an island as "a mass of land surrounded by water, separate from the Scottish mainland" but although they include islands linked by bridges etc., this is not clear from this definition. Haswell-Smith (2004) uses "an Island is a piece of land or group of pieces of land which is entirely surrounded by water at Lowest Astronomical Tide and to which there is no permanent means of dry access". This consciously excludes bridged islands, which most other sources include.) A complication relating to membership of this list is that there are various descriptions of the scope of the Hebrides, the large group of islands that lie off Scotland's west coast. The Collins Encyclopedia of Scotland describes the Inner Hebrides as lying "east of The Minch", which would include any and all offshore islands. There are various islands that lie in the sea lochs such as Eilean Bàn and Eilean Donan that might not ordinarily be described as "Hebridean" but no formal definitions exist and for simplicity they are included in the List of Inner Hebrides rather than here.

== Main islands ==
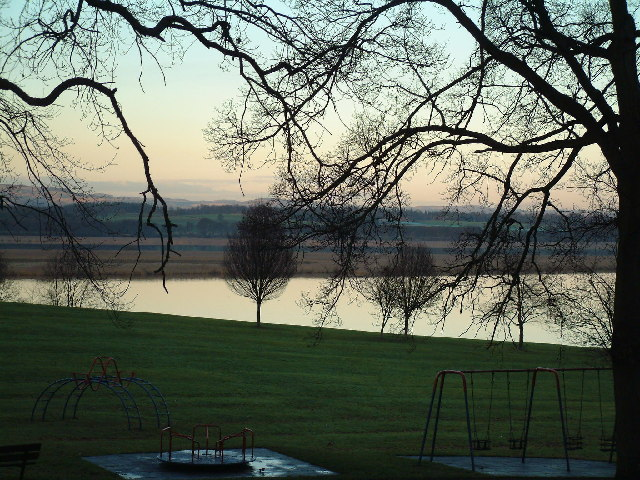
Mugdrum seen from Newburgh

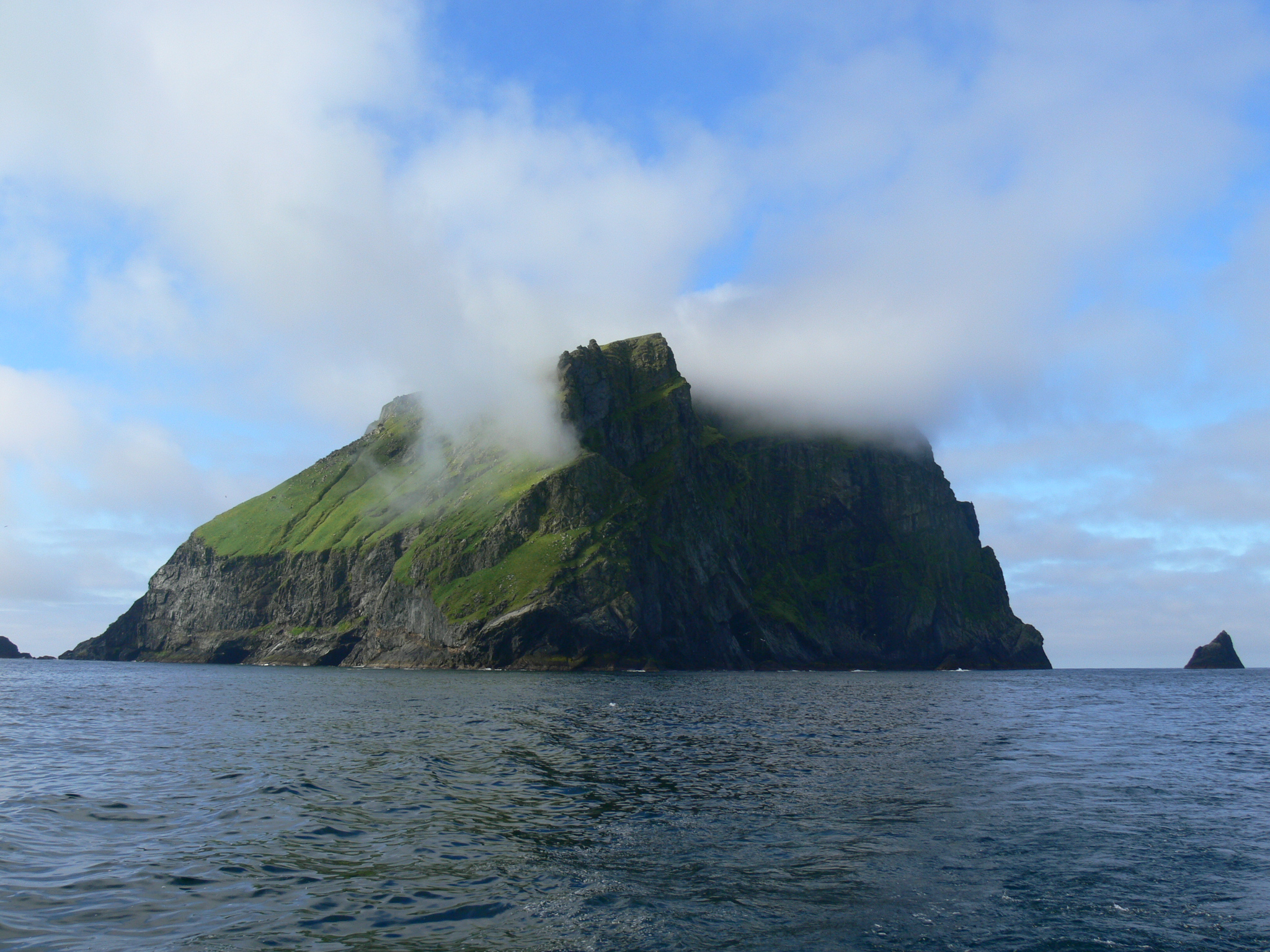
Soay, St Kilda, the westernmost island of Scotland (excluding Rockall, the status of which is a matter of dispute)

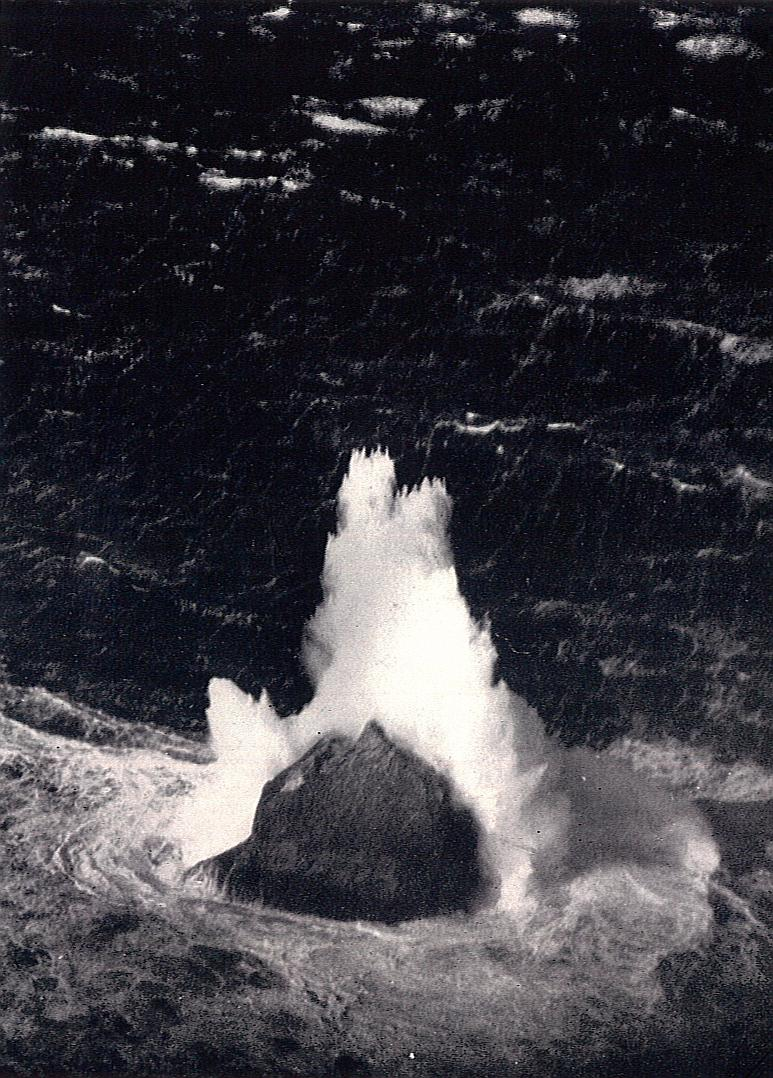
Winter waves breaking over Rockall in 1943

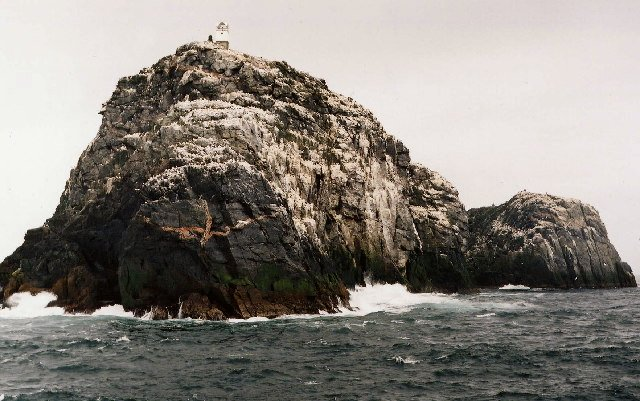
Sula Sgeir

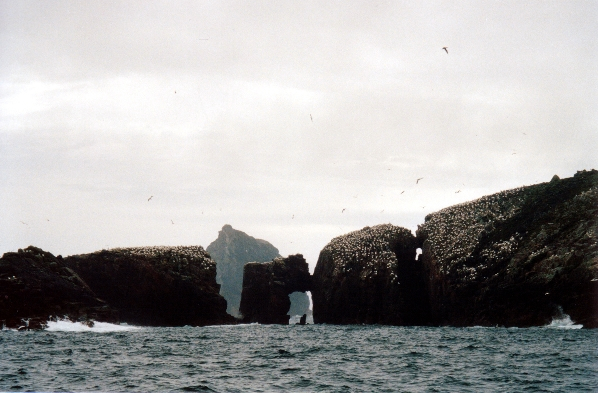
The westernmost of the Flannan Isles: Eilean a' Ghobha and Roareim with Brona Cleit in the distance

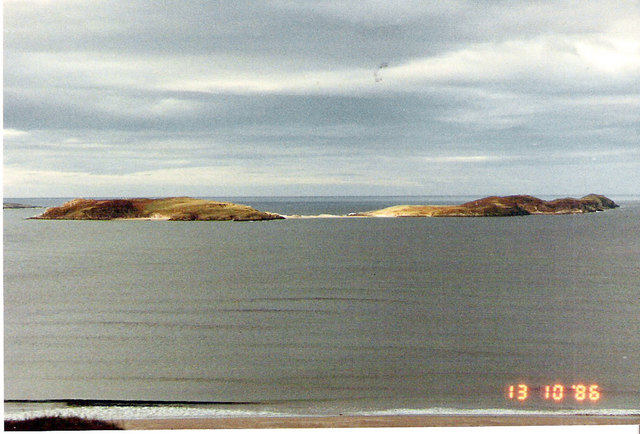
The Rabbit Islands

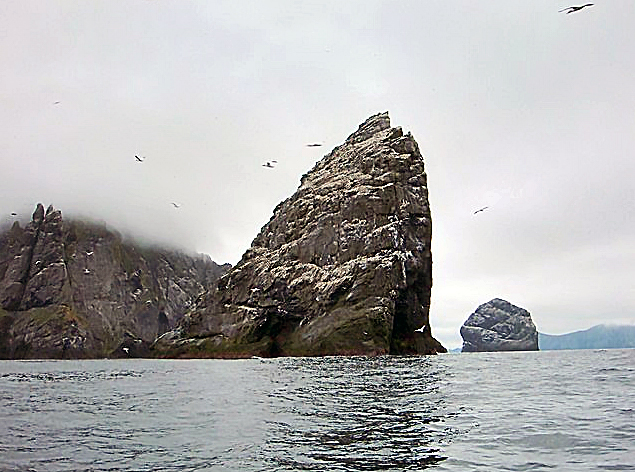
Stac an Armin with Boreray to the left and Stac Lee beyond at right

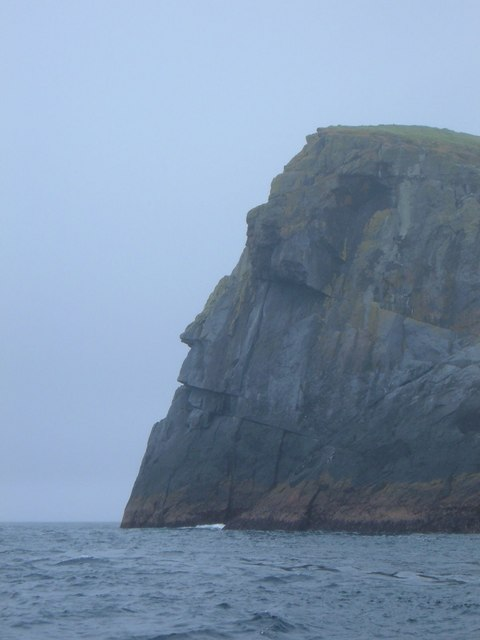
Stac Levenish cliff's face silhouette

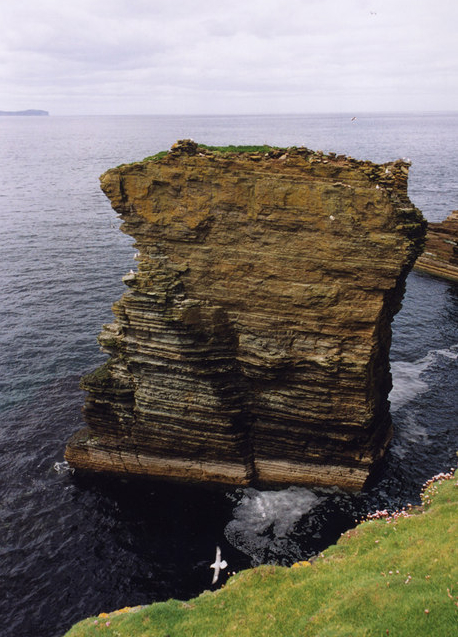
Castle Mestag, Stroma

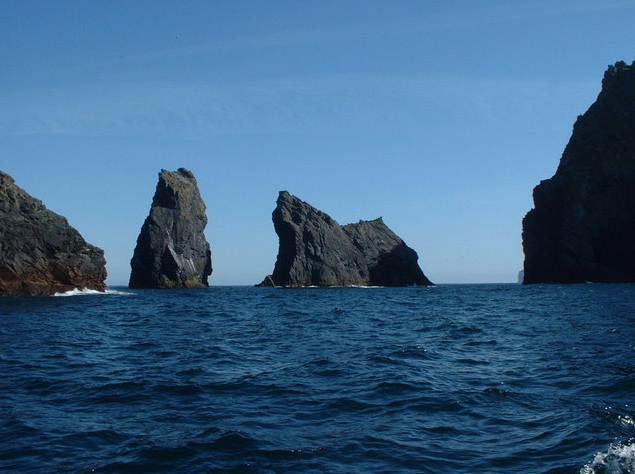
Stac Biorach (at left) and Stac Soay between Hirta and Soay

There are several small groupings of outlying islands involved. The most significant of these is the St Kilda archipelago (Note: In addition to World Heritage Status, which none of the other outlying islands share, Hirta is by far the largest individual island (Soay and Boreray are fourth and fifth largest), and at its maximum of 180 its population was by far the largest, only Stroma coming close. Numerous books have been written about these islands, their history and wildlife, which at one time included three unique sub-species – two mice and the St Kilda wren.) which lies 64 kilometres (40 mi) west-northwest of North Uist and is now a World Heritage Site. It is one of the few to hold joint status for its natural and cultural qualities. (Note: When inhabited, these islands had strong cultural ties to the Hebrides, but they are quite distinct from the Outer Hebrides geologically and Haswell-Smith (2004) lists St Kilda in "Section 9: The Atlantic Outliers".) At 196 metres (643 ft) Stac an Armin is the highest sea stack in the British Isles and in July 1840, the last great auk seen in the British Isles was captured there.

East of St Kilda are the Flannan Isles, where all three lighthouse keepers mysteriously vanished without trace in December 1900. Further north and east are the two outliers of Sula Sgeir and North Rona, which have strong cultural links to the Outer Hebrides. North Rona is 71 kilometres (44 mi) north north east of Butt of Lewis and 18 kilometres (11 mi) east of Sula Sgeir. It is the remotest island in the British Isles ever to have been inhabited on a long-term basis. It is also closer than any other part of Scotland to the Faroe Islands. Sule Skerry and Sule Stack lie further east and are administratively part of Orkney.

The islands of the north coast are remote from the main centres of population, although they mostly lie close to the mainland. There is a small group of larger islands near Tongue Bay, but the largest on this coast is Stroma in the Pentland Firth, between Caithness and Orkney. Innis Mhòr in the Dornoch Firth is the largest of a handful of small islets off the coast of Easter Ross. Further south are Inchcape off the coast of Angus, and Mugdrum, the only substantial island in the Firth of Tay. There is a cluster of islands in the Solway Firth that marks the south western border of Scotland, including the Islands of Fleet, in Wigtown Bay.

Most of the smaller islets that surround those in the main list are obscure and none have been permanently inhabited in modern times. Nonetheless, some have a degree of historical significance. Castle Mestag off Stroma is the ruins of a once fortified stack accessible only via a drawbridge. (Note: Possibly also known as "The Robber's Castle" and said to have been a hideout of the 12th-century pirate Sweyn Asleifsson.) Some islets are identified as "storm washed", meaning that although they are partly above mean sea level, large waves wash over the top of them during storms, rendering them uninhabitable.

Finally, there is remote Rockall, which is 367 kilometres (228 mi) to the west of North Uist. It is a small rocky islet in the North Atlantic which could be, in James Fisher's words, "the most isolated small rock in the oceans of the world" (Note: There are numerous islands that are more remote from a mainland, but not from other islands. Rockall lies "the furthest distance from any other outcrop or land of any description".) and which was declared part of Scotland by the Island of Rockall Act 1972. However, the legality of the claim is disputed by the Republic of Ireland, Denmark and Iceland and it is probably unenforceable in international law. (Note: Aird an Runair, North Uist NF686705 is the nearest place on an inhabited British island to Rockall, about 367 km (228 mi) (198 nmi) away. Gob a' Ghaill, on uninhabited Soay, St Kilda and the nearest point of undisputed British soil at NA055014 is about 301 km (187 mi) (162 nmi) away.)

Island	Group	Area (ha)	Height (m) (Note: Note that the Ordnance Survey maps mark the height above sea level of a high point on most islands, but in a small number of cases, this may not be the highest point.)	Light (Note: Indicates the presence of a lighthouse on Ordnance Survey maps.)	Last inhabited (Note: Indicates the last known date of permanent, year round settlement.)	Surrounding islets
Ardwall Isle	Islands of Fleet	22	34	No	18th century? (Note: The Ordnance Survey indicate the remains of an 8th-century chapel, which is also the site of an 18th-century "tavern" and there is an uninhabited cottage facing the sea.)	Old Man of Fleet
Barlocco Isle	Islands of Fleet	10	10	No	Inhabitation unlikely	The Three Brethren
Big Scare	Solway Firth	<1	21	No	Inhabitation very unlikely	Little Scares (3)
Boreray	St Kilda	77	384	No	Iron Age? (Note: Fleming identifies a wheelhouse on the island. Various tales told by the St Kildans hint at occupation in the historic period, although no concrete evidence of this has been found. There is nowhere to store a boat and any permanent residents would have been marooned there and dependent on outside assistance to leave. As a result of a smallpox outbreak on Hirta in 1724, three men and eight boys were marooned on Boreray until the following May.)	An t-Sail, Sgarbhstac
Bròna Cleit	Flannan Isles	1	c. 20	No	Inhabitation very unlikely	None
Buchan Ness	Buchan coast	c. 8	5	Yes	2022 (Note: Included by the National Records of Scotland as inhabited in 2022, this tidal islet is connected to the mainland by a road. The Gazetteer for Scotland describes it as a peninsula.)	Inch Biggle
Dùn	St Kilda	32	178	No	Unknown (Note: The island's name means "fort" but there is only a single ruined wall of a structure said to have been built in the far-distant past by the mythical Fir Bolg.)	Hamalan, Giasgeir, Sgeir Cul an Rubha, Sgeir Mhòr
Eilean a' Ghobha	Flannan Isles	8	57	No	Inhabitation very unlikely	None
Eilean Choraidh	Loch Eriboll	26	26	No	1930s	A' chlèit
Eilean Hoan	Loch Eriboll	28	25	No	Early 1800s	A' Ghoil-sgeir, An Cruachan, An Dubh-sgeir, Eilean Clùimhrig, Pocan Smoo
Eilean Mòr	Flannan Isles	17.5 (Note: According to the Joint Nature Conservation Committee the total land area of the Flannan Isles is 58.87 hectares (145.5 acres).)	88	Yes	1971	Deirc na Sgeir, Làmh à Sgeir Beag, Làmh an Sgeir Mòire
Eilean nan Ròn	Tongue Bay	138	76	No	1930s or 40s (Note: There was a population of 63 in 1891 and 30 in 1931. Uninhabited by 1951.)	An Innis, Eilean Iosal, Meall Thailm
Eilean Taighe	Flannan Isles	11	59	No	Unknown (Note: The name is Gaelic for "island of the house" and there is a tiny ruined structure.)	Gealtaire Beag, Gealtaire Mòr, Hamasgeir
Hestan Island	Solway Firth	c.11	54	Yes	Unknown (Note: There is a holiday cottage, an unmanned lighthouse and the remains of a 14th-century "Manor House".)	None
Hirta	St Kilda	670	430	No	1930	An Torc, Bradastac, Mina Stac, Sgeir Domhnuill, Sgeir Mhòr, Sgeir nan Sgarbh
Inchcape	Angus coast	0.61	0 (Note: The reef is covered by seawater at high tide and only 1.3 metres (4.3 ft) lies above water at low tides.)	Yes	1988 (Note: The lighthouse was manned from 1810 until 1988.)	None
Innis Mhòr	Easter Ross	26	<5	No	Shifting sands	None (Note: The nearby Innis Bheag or "Paterson Island" is now a sand spit joined to the Morrich More.)
Little Ross	Solway Firth	7	35	Yes	Inhabitation unlikely	Sugarloaf
Mugdrum	Firth of Tay	32	4	No	Inhabitation unlikely	None
Murray's Isles	Islands of Fleet	1 (Note: As the name implies there are two small islets separated at higher stages of the tide. The smaller islet is circa 0.25 hectares (0.62 acres).)	c.5	No	Inhabitation unlikely (Note: The Royal Commission on the Ancient and Historical Monuments of Scotland (RCAHMS) indicate the existence of a "structure" or "wall".)	Horse Mark
Neave Island	Tongue Bay	30	70	No	Unknown (Note: The Ordnance Survey indicate the presence of a ruined chapel.)	Stac an Fhamhair
North Rona	North west	109	108	No	1885	Gealldraig Mhòr, Lòba Sgeir
Rabbit Islands	Tongue Bay	32	45	No	Unknown (Note: The two islands are connected to one another and the mainland at low tides and were probably inhabited at some point in the past. The Gaelic name is Eilean nan Gall meaning "islands of the strangers", which is thought to refer to their usage by Danish Vikings.)	Dubh Sgeir-Mhòr, Eilean á Chaoil, Eilean Creagach, Sgeir an Òir, Talmine Island
Roaireim	Flannan Isles	5	52	No	Inhabitation very unlikely	None (Note: None of the very small islets are named by the Ordnance Survey.)
Rockall	North Atlantic	0.0624 (Note: An area estimate of 624 square metres (6,720 sq ft). The height is circa 20 metres (66 ft).)	21.4	No	Storm washed	Hasselwood Rock, Helen's Reef
Rough Island	Solway Firth	8	24	No	Inhabitation unlikely	Craig Roan, Spring Stones
Sgeir Toman	Flannan Isles	4	43	No	Inhabitation very unlikely	Sgeir Righinn
Soay	St Kilda	99	378	No	Inhabitation unlikely (Note: Like nearby Boreray there is nowhere to store a boat and any permanent residents would have been marooned there and dependent on outside assistance to leave. There is a primitive hut known as Taigh Dugan (Dugan's house). This is little more than an excavated hole under a huge stone with two rude walls on the sides. The story of its creation relates to two sheep-stealing brothers from Lewis who came to St Kilda only to cause further trouble. Dugan was exiled to Soay, where he died; the other, called Fearchar Mòr, was sent to Stac an Armin, where he found life so intolerable he cast himself into the sea.)	Am Plastair, Sgeir Mac Righ Lochlainn, Stac Biorach, Stac Dona, Stac Soay.
Soraigh	Flannan Isles	6	41	No	Inhabitation very unlikely	None
Stac an Armin	St Kilda	9	196	No	Never inhabited (Note: It would be impossible to maintain life for long on this precipitous crag although there are 78 storage cleitean and a small bothy used by the native St Kildan fowlers in the summer.)	None
Stac Lee	St Kilda	2.3	172	No	Never inhabited	None
Stac Levenish	St Kilda	2.42	62	No	Never inhabited	Na Bodhan
Stroma	Caithness	375	53	Yes	1996	Castle Mestag
Sula Sgeir	North west	15 (Note: A figure of 124.4 hectares (307 acres) for Rona and Sula Sgeir is provided by Wood. Haswell Smith gives 109 hectares (270 acres) for North Rona. Sula Sgeir is therefore c. 15.4 hectares (38 acres).)	70	Yes	Storm washed	Bogha Córr, Grallsgeir
Sule Skerry	Orkney	16	12	Yes	1982	None
Sule Stack	Orkney	2.9	36	No	Storm washed	None

== Smaller islets off the mainland ==
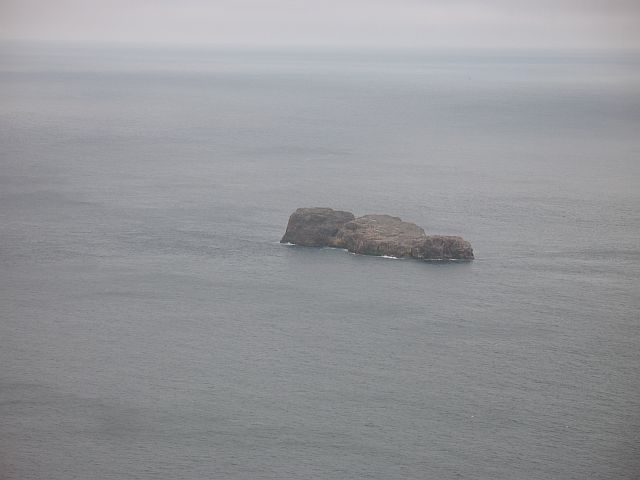
An Garbh-eilean off the north coast near Durness

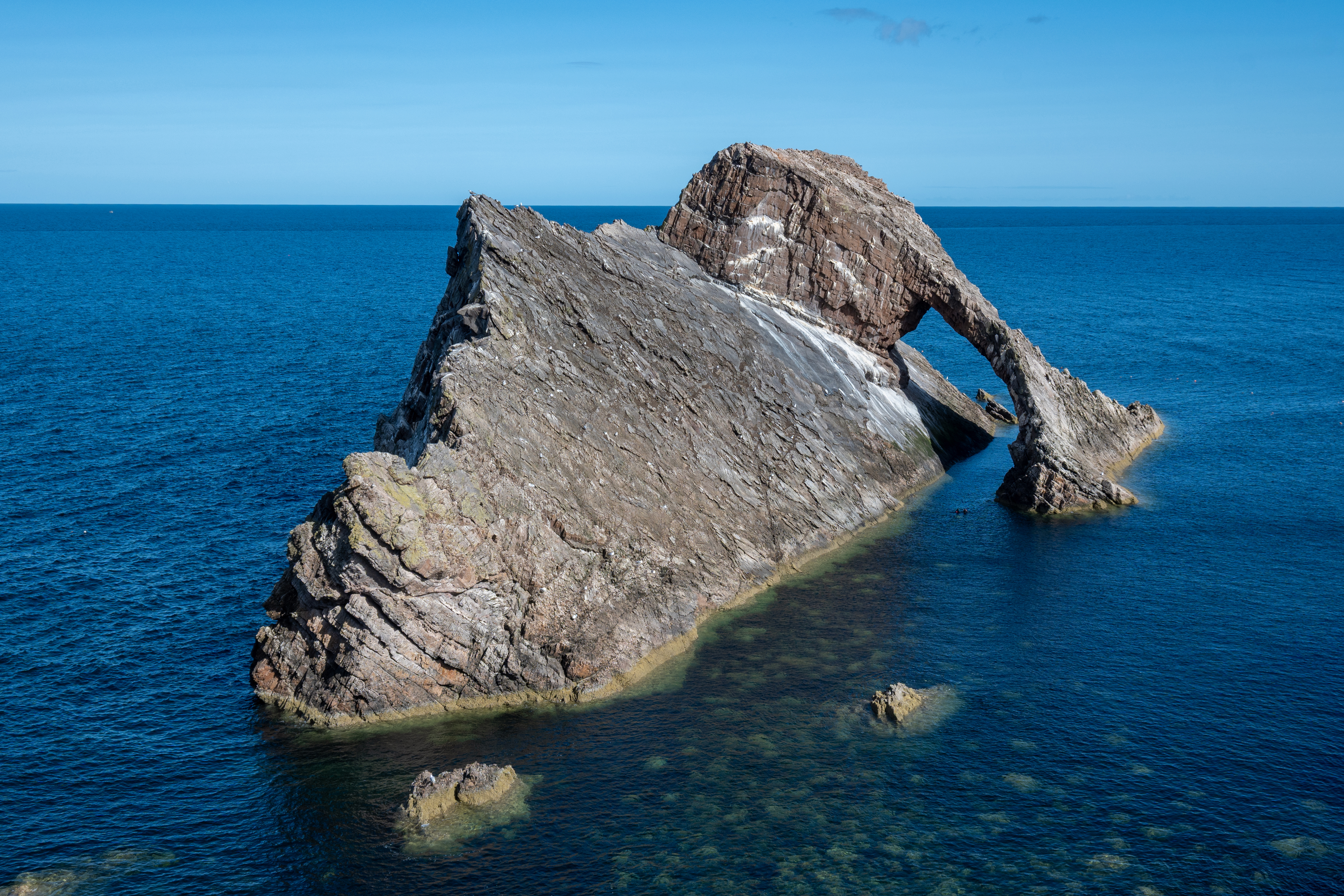
Bow Fiddle Rock

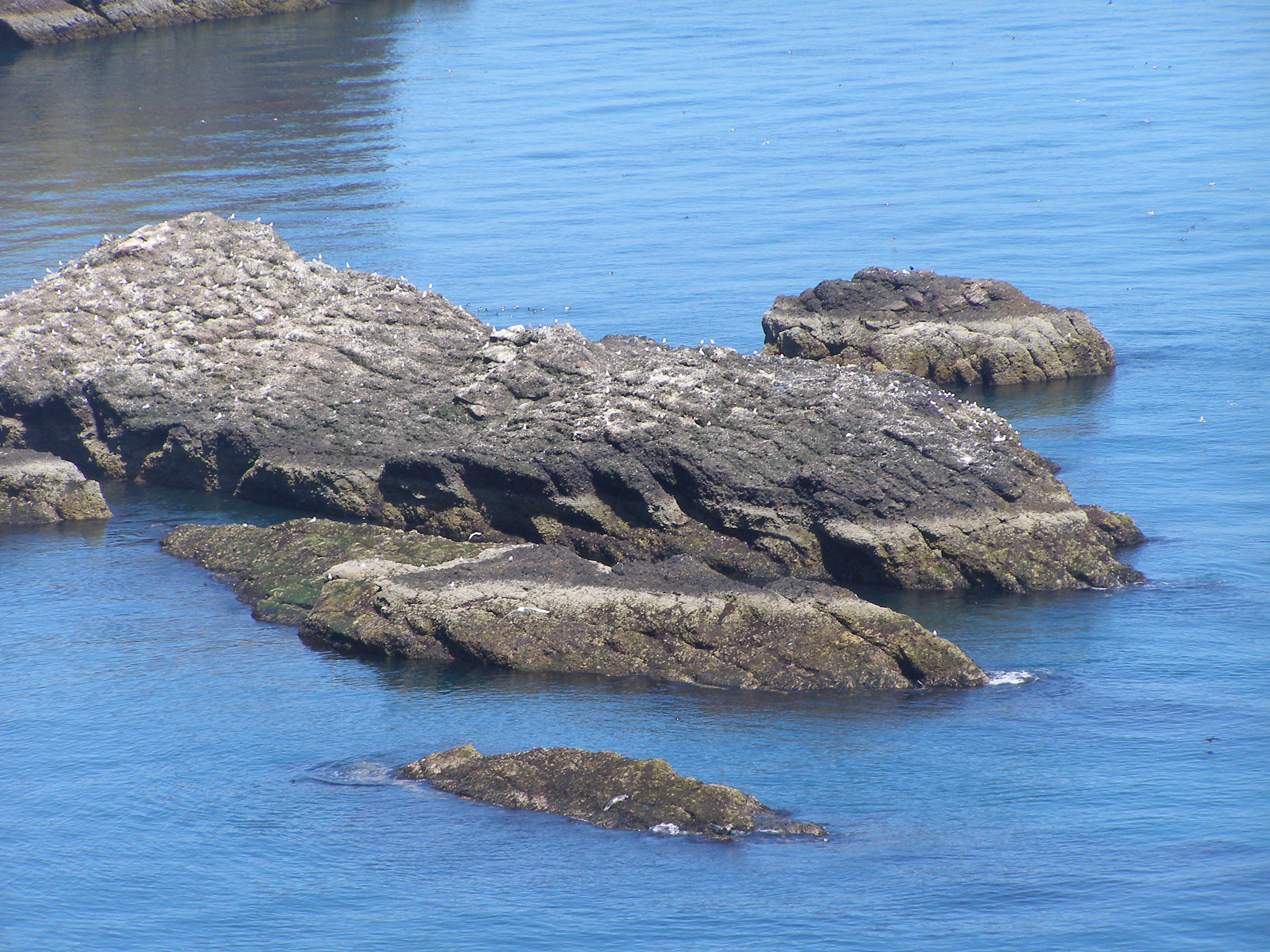
The skerry of Craiglethy – one of the few east coast islands

- Solway Firth: Inch
- North coast (from west to east): Stac an Dunain, Duslic, Stack Clò Kearvaig, An Garbh-eilean, Na Glas Leacan, Eilean Dubh, Clach Bheag na Faraid, Clach Mhòr na Faraid, Àigeach, Eilean Polsain, Boursa Island, Glas-eilean Mòr, Garbh-eilean, Wester Clett, Middle Clett, Easter Clett, Little Clett, Clett.
- East coast:
  - North Moray Firth (from north to south): The Knee, Stacks of Duncansby, Stack o' Brough, South Stack, The Stacks, Eilean na h-Aibhne, Three Kings.
  - South Moray Firth (from west to east): Covesea Skerries, Halliman Skerries, Boar's Head Rock, West Muck, East Muck, Craigenroan, Bow Fiddle Rock, Collie Rocks, Craigandargity.
  - Kinnaird Head to the Bullers of Buchan: The Ron, The Skerry, Miekle Mackie, Miekle Donnon, Little Donnon, Craig Snow, Meikle Dumeath, Little Dumeath.
  - Bullers of Buchan to Girdle Ness: Dunbuy, The Donnons, Skellyis of Harrol.
  - Girdle Ness to Buddon Ness: Craiglethy, Craigmaroinn, May Craig.

Other than Mugdrum in the Firth of Tay and the Islands of the Forth there are no genuine islands on the east coast of Scotland south of Buddon Ness.

== Tidally exposed islets and skerries ==
There are various smaller islets and skerries in the seas surrounding the mainland of Scotland that are only exposed at lower stages of the tide. Craiglethy is part of the Fowlsheugh nature reserve. The Three Kings, off the coast of Easter Ross near Balintore, is also known as Creag Harail or Harold's Rock and called The King's Sons in the New Statistical Account of Scotland. According to legend, three sons of a Danish prince, sailing to avenge their sister's wrongs, were wrecked here and gave these rocks their collective name. Their graves were marked by the sculptured stones of Nigg, Shandwick and Hilton of Cadboll. Another story has their burial at Nigg Rocks below the North Sutor.

== See also ==
- List of Outer Hebrides
- Inner Hebrides
- List of Orkney islands
- List of Shetland islands
- Islands of the Clyde
- Islands of the Forth
- List of islands of Scotland
- Scottish island names
- List of islands of the British Isles
- Fair Isle in Shetland, the most remote inhabited island in the United Kingdom, which lies 38 kilometres (24 mi) south-west of the Mainland.
- Foula in Shetland, which lies 22 kilometres (14 mi) west of the Mainland.

== References and footnotes ==
General references

- General Register Office for Scotland (28 November 2003) Scotland's Census 2001 – Occasional Paper No 10: Statistics for Inhabited Islands. Retrieved 26 February 2012.
- Fisher, James (1956) Rockall. London. Geoffrey Bles.
- Fleming, Andrew (2005) St Kilda and the Wider World: Tales of an Iconic Island. Windgather Press. ISBN 1-905119-00-3
- Haswell-Smith, Hamish. (2004) The Scottish Islands. Edinburgh. Canongate. ISBN 1-84195-454-3
- Keay, J. & Keay, J. (1994) Collins Encyclopaedia of Scotland. London. HarperCollins.
- Mac an Tàilleir, Iain (2003) Goireasan Cànain / Language Resources - Tadhail is Ionnsaich : Pàrlamaid na h-Alba. (pdf) Pàrlamaid na h-Alba. Retrieved 26 October 2025.
- Maclean, Charles (1977) Island on the Edge of the World: the Story of St. Kilda. Edinburgh. Canongate. ISBN 0-903937-41-7
- Nicholson, Christopher. (1995) Rock Lighthouses of Britain: The End of an Era? Caithness. Whittles. ISBN 1-870325-41-9
- Ordnance Survey (2009) "Get-a-map". Retrieved 6–10 February 2010.
- Quine, David (2000) St Kilda. Grantown-on-Spey. Colin Baxter Island Guides. ISBN 1-84107-008-4
- Rackwitz, Martin (2007) Travels to Terra Incognita: The Scottish Highlands and Hebrides in Early Modern Travellers' Accounts C. 1600 to 1800. Waxmann Verlag. ISBN 978-3-8309-1699-4
- Watson, William John (1976) "Place Names of Ross and Cromarty" Ross & Cromarty Heritage Society. ISBN 978-1-4097-6657-5

Notes

Citations
