= Sule Stack =

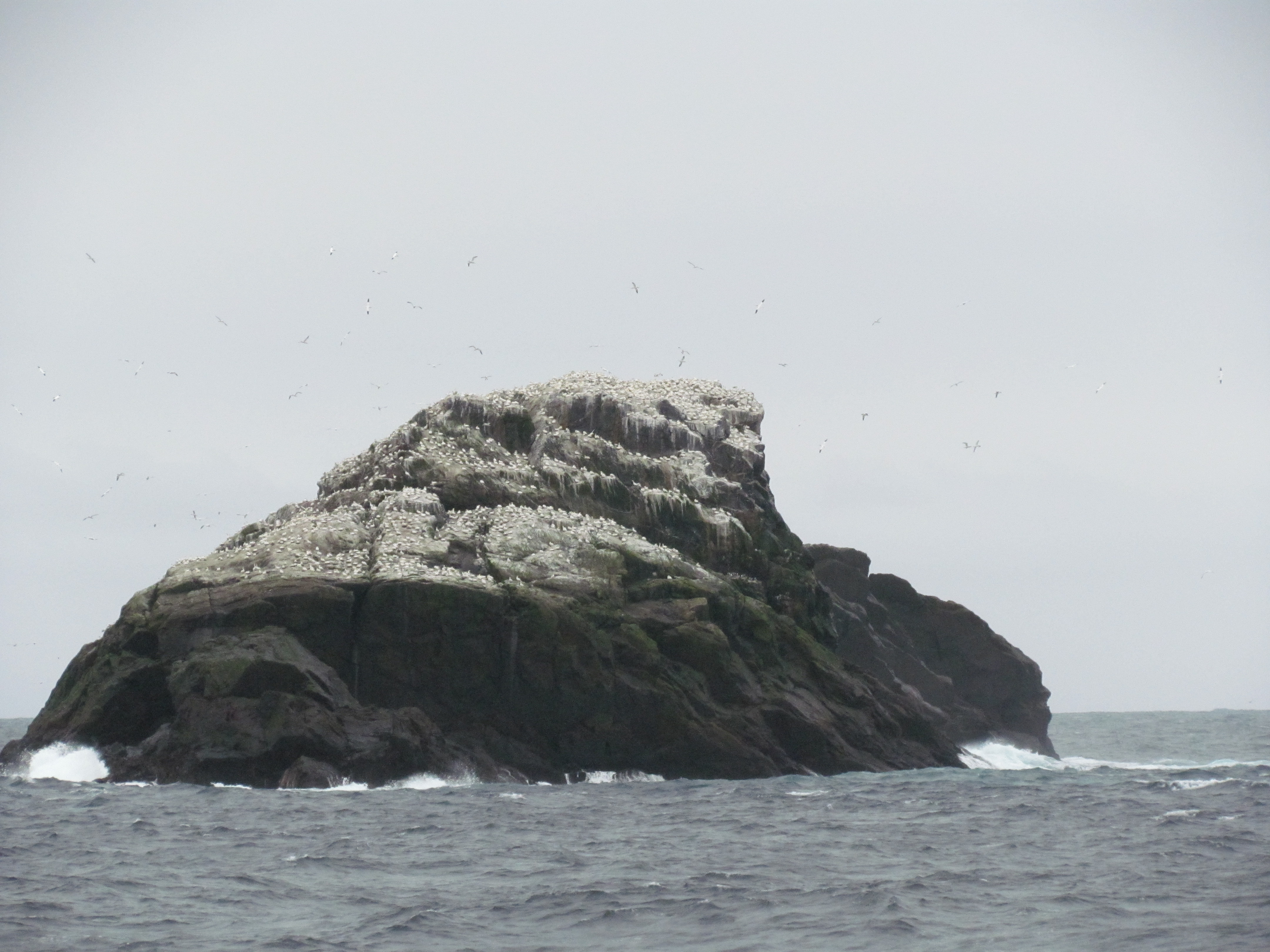

Location
- Location within Scotland
- OS grid reference: HX561179
- Coordinates: 59.02°N 4.51°W

Name
- Name meaning: Gannet Stack, from sùlaire (Scottish Gaelic for northern gannet), and Stack (originally Norse) Norse

Physical geography
- Island group: North Atlantic
- Area: 2.9 ha (7 1/4 acres)
- Highest elevation: 36 m (118 ft)

Administration
- Council area: Orkney
- Country: Scotland
- Sovereign state: United Kingdom

Demographics
- Population: 0

Sule Stack or Stack Skerry is an extremely remote island or stack in the North Atlantic off the north coast of Scotland. It is formed of Lewisian gneiss.

Sule Stack lies 49 kilometres (26 1/2 nautical miles) north of the Scottish mainland, and 66 km (35 1/2 nmi) west of the Orkney mainland, at grid reference HX561179. Sule Stack's sole neighbour, Sule Skerry, lies 10 km (5 1/2 nmi) northeast and the remote islands of Rona and Sula Sgeir lie further to the west. Sule Stack and Sule Skerry are home to thousands of gannets and as a result are listed as a special protection area; the island falls within the administrative region of the Orkney Islands.

The island (along with Sule Skerry) has been designated an Important Bird Area (IBA) by BirdLife International because it supports breeding populations of several species of seabirds.

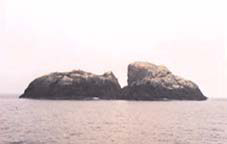
From the west, Sule Stack appears like a double rock

Bird species nesting on the stack include:

- Razorbill Alca torda
- Atlantic puffin Fratercula arctica
- Fulmar Fulmarus glacialis
- Great black-backed gull Larus marinus
- Common shag Phalacrocorax aristotelis
- Black-legged kittiwake Rissa tridactyla
- Arctic tern Sterna paradisaea
- Northern gannet Morus bassanus
- Common guillemot Uria aalge

== See also ==
- List of outlying islands of Scotland

== Sources ==
- Haswell-Smith, Hamish (2004). The Scottish Islands. Edinburgh: Canongate. ISBN 978-1-84195-454-7.
- Kirton, S.R.; Hitchen, K. (1987). "Timing and style of crustal extension N of the Scottish mainland". In Coward, M.P.; Dewey, J.F.; Hancock, P.L. (eds.). Continental Extensional Tectonics. Special Publications. Vol. 28. London: Geological Society. pp. 501–510. ISBN 978-0-632-01605-1.
- National Records of Scotland (15 August 2013). "Appendix 2: Population and households on Scotland's Inhabited Islands" (PDF). Statistical Bulletin: 2011 Census: First Results on Population and Household Estimates for Scotland Release 1C (Part Two) (PDF) (Report). SG/2013/126.
- Orkney (Mainland) (Map). 1:50,000. Landranger. Ordnance Survey. 2014. ISBN 9780319228128.
- Stewart, Malcolm (1 February 1938), "Notes on the Gannetries of Sule Stack and Sula Sgeir" (PDF), British Birds, 31 (9), Witherby & Co.: 282–294, archived from the original (PDF) on 19 September 2021
- "Sule Skerry & Stack Skerry". European Environment Agency.
