= Sule Skerry =

Remote skerry in the North Atlantic off the north coast of Scotland

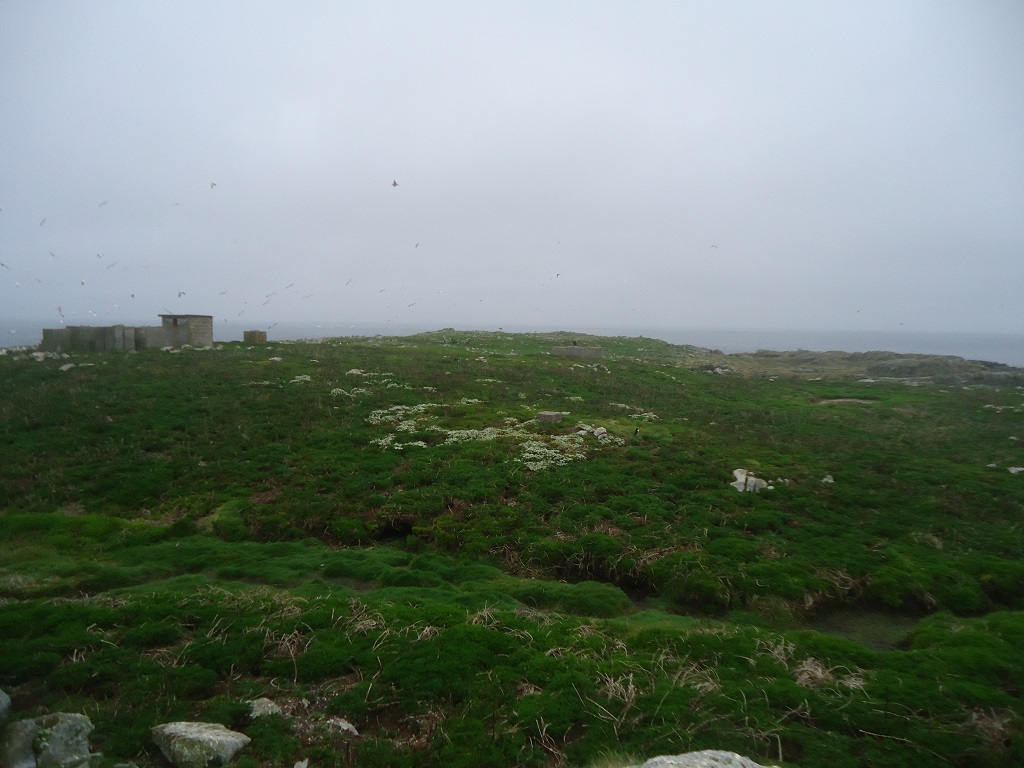

Location
- Location within Scotland
- OS grid reference: HX621244
- Coordinates: 59.08°N 4.41°W

Physical geography
- Island group: North Atlantic
- Area: 16 ha (40 acres)
- Highest elevation: 12 m (39 ft)

Administration
- Council area: Orkney
- Country: Scotland
- Sovereign state: United Kingdom

Demographics
- Population: 0
- Sule Skerry Lighthouse
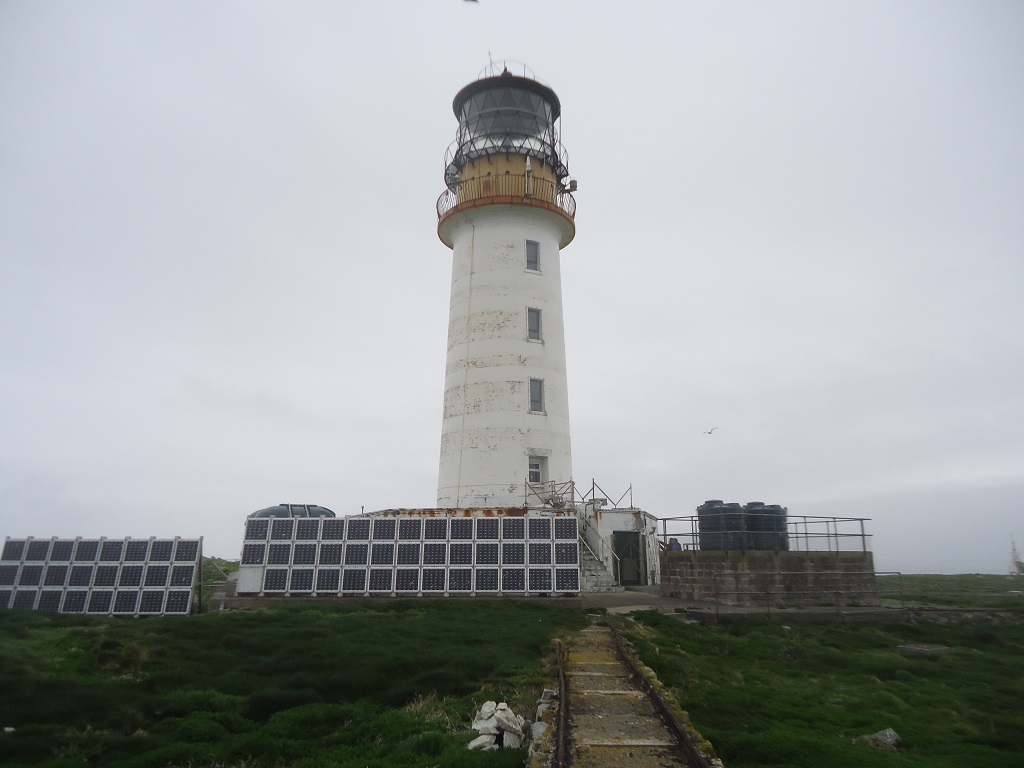
- Coordinates: 59.084713°N 4.407325°W
- Constructed: 1895
- Built by: David Alan Stevenson, Charles Alexander Stevenson
- Construction: masonry tower
- Automated: 1982
- Height: 27 m (89 ft)
- Shape: cylindrical tower with balcony and lantern
- Markings: white tower, black lantern, ochre trim
- Power source: solar power
- Operator: Northern Lighthouse Board
- Heritage: category A listed building
- Focal height: 34 m (112 ft)
- Lens: "hyperradiant" Fresnel lens
- Range: 21 nmi (39 km)
- Characteristic: Fl (2) W 15 s

Sule Skerry is a remote skerry in the North Atlantic off the north coast of Scotland.

== Geography ==
Sule Skerry lies 60 kilometres (32 nautical miles) west of the Orkney Mainland at grid reference HX621244. Sule Skerry's sole neighbour, Sule Stack, lies 10 km (5 1/2 nmi) to the southwest; the remote islands of Rona and Sula Sgeir lie approximately 80 km (45 nmi) further west. Sule Skerry and Sule Stack are both a part of the Orkney Islands council area.

Sule Skerry is 16 hectares (40 acres) in area and about 800 m (1/2 mi) long. It reaches a height of 12 metres (40 feet). It is formed of Lewisian gneiss.

== Flora and fauna ==
The island is treeless, since few trees would withstand the high winds of winter and salt spray environment. The dominant plant is maritime mayweed (Tripleurospermum maritimum).

Sule Skerry together with Sule Stack are listed as a Special Protection Area as they are home during the breeding season to thousands of puffins, gannets, smaller numbers of the rarer Leach's storm petrel, and storm petrels. Leach's storm petrel visit the island, however breeding is not proved. Since the first visiting birds in 2003, there is now a large breeding population of gannets; a possible overflow from nearby Sule Stack.

Every three years the puffins and other seabirds on Sule Skerry are monitored by a team of birders called the Sule Skerry Ringing Group. The group have been monitoring the seabirds on the island since 1975.

=== Important Bird Area ===
The island (alongside Sule Stack) has been designated an Important Bird Area (IBA) by BirdLife International, because it supports breeding populations of several species of seabirds.

== Lighthouse ==
Sule Skerry with lighthouse from the south (drawing)

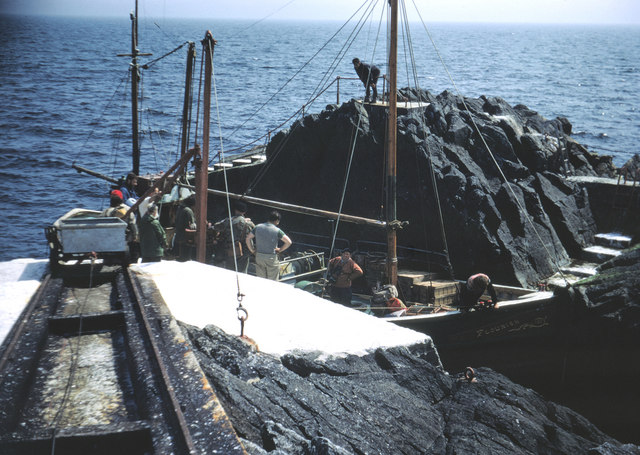
Landing Place, July 15, 1967

There is a lighthouse at the centre high point of the island, and a number of small cairns around its periphery. According to the Guinness Book of Records, the Sule Skerry lighthouse was the most remote manned lighthouse in Great Britain from its opening in 1895 until its automation in 1982. Its remote location meant that construction could only take place during the summer, thus it took from 1892–94 to complete.

A meteorological buoy used in the Met Office's Marine Automatic Weather Station (MAWS) Network is located off Sule Skerry. Results from the buoy are used in the Shipping Forecast.

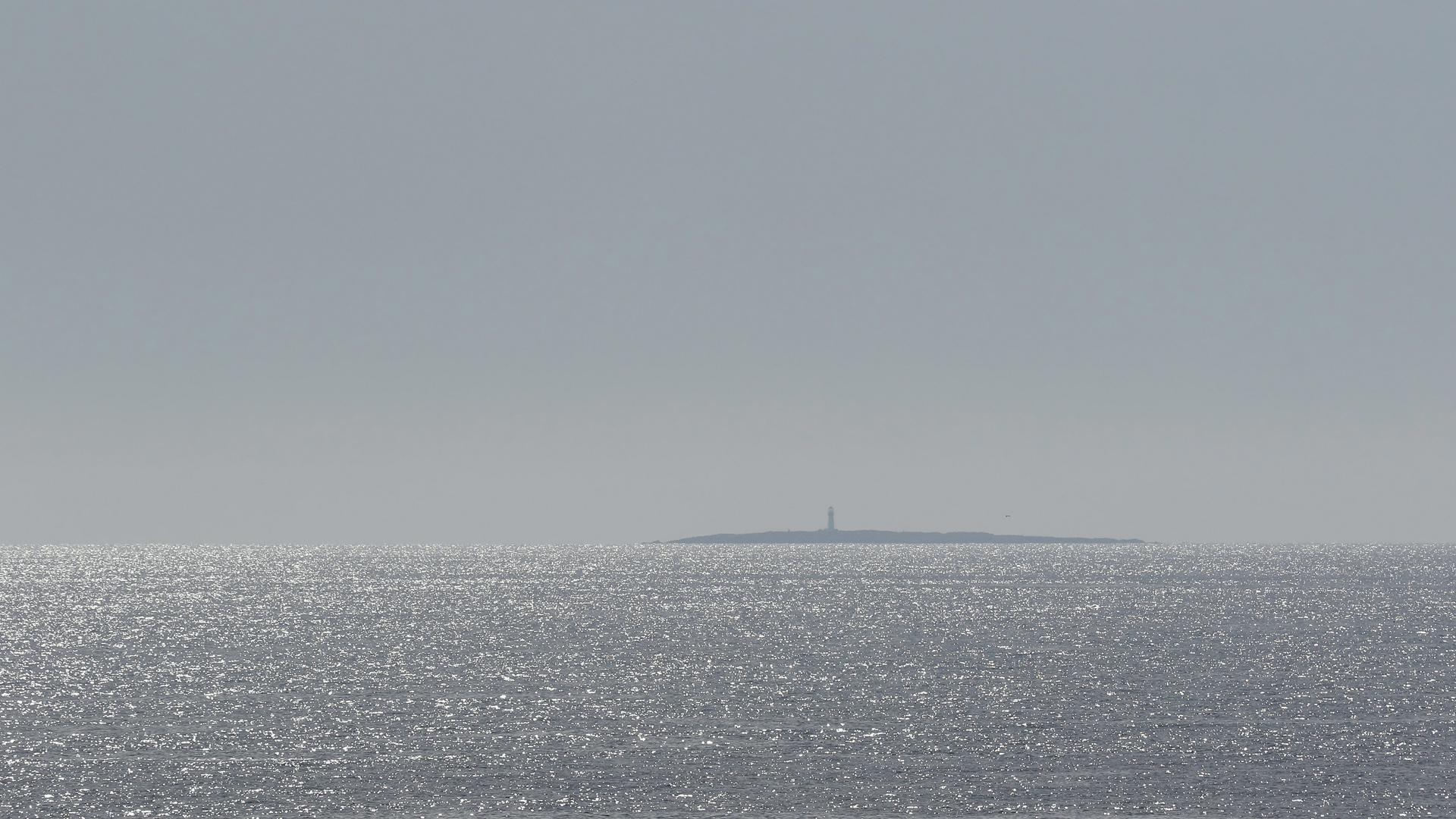
Sule Skerry from Orkney.

== Folklore ==
"The Great Silkie of Sule Skerry" is a story of a Silkie who lives on Sule Skerry.

== See also ==
- List of islands in Scotland
- List of lighthouses in Scotland
- List of Northern Lighthouse Board lighthouses
- List of outlying islands of Scotland
