= List of Important Bird Areas in the United Kingdom =

The following is a list of Important Bird Areas in the United Kingdom:

== England ==
- Bodmin Moor, Cornwall
- Duddon Estuary, Cumbria
- Leighton Moss RSPB reserve, Lancashire

== Scotland ==
Site Code	Name	Reference
101A	North Rona and Sula Sgeir	Pritchard et al. 1992
102A	Flannan Isles	Pritchard et al. 1992:
103A	St Kilda	Pritchard et al. 1992:
104A	Shiant Isles	Pritchard et al. 1992:
105A	West Sound of Harris	Pritchard et al. 1992:
107A	Monach Islands	Pritchard et al. 1992:
108A	South Uist Machair and Lochs	Pritchard et al. 1992:
XXX	Fowlsheugh, Aberdeenshire	Pritchard et al. 1992:
