= Eilean Hoan =

Island in Loch Eriboll on the north coast of Scotland

Eilean Hoan (Gaelic)

Location
- Eilean Hoan shown within Highland Scotland
- OS grid reference: NC444673
- Coordinates: 58.566°N 4.676°W

Name
- Name meaning: haven island

Physical geography
- Island group: Outlier
- Area: 28 ha
- Highest elevation: 24 m

Administration
- Council area: Highland
- Country: Scotland
- Sovereign state: United Kingdom

Demographics
- Population rank: n/a

Eilean Hoan is an island in Loch Eriboll in Sutherland on the north coast of Scotland. It is about 28 hectares (69 acres) in extent and the highest point is 25 metres (82 ft) above sea level. Its name is of Gaelic and Old Norse derivation and means "haven island".

The island was last inhabited in the early 19th century and the Ordnance Survey indicate the presence of a ruined croft. It is now a nature reserve. Eilean Hoan is located at the northern, seaward end of the loch and there are various small islets in the vicinity including A' Ghoil-sgeir, An Cruachan, An Dubh-sgeir, Eilean Clùimhrig, and Pocan Smoo.

Further south, and deeper into the loch is Eilean Choraidh.
