= Innis Mhòr =

Tidal island off the east coast of Scotland

Innis Mhòr, (Gaelic)
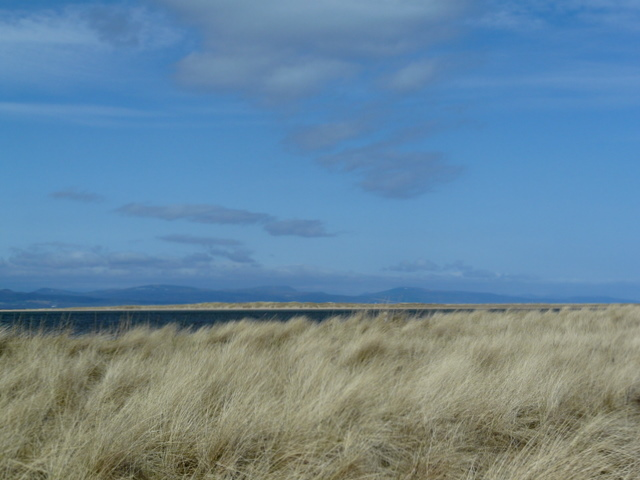
- Rubh' na h-Innse Moire in the foreground with Innis Mhòr beyond and the hills of Sutherland in the background.

Location
- Innis Mhòr shown within Highland Scotland
- OS grid reference: NH849862
- Coordinates: 57.851°N 3.94°W

Name
- Name meaning: big island

Physical geography
- Island group: Outlier
- Area: 26 ha (64 acres)
- Highest elevation: <5 m

Administration
- Council area: Highland
- Country: Scotland
- Sovereign state: United Kingdom

Demographics
- Population rank: n/a

Innis Mhòr is a tidal island in the Dornoch Firth of Easter Ross off the east coast of Scotland. It is about 26 hectares (64 acres) in extent and is largely, if not exclusively, made up of moving sand dunes. No point on the island is greater than 5 metres (16 ft) above sea level. It has almost certainly never been permanently inhabited. The nearest settlement is Inver to the south (which is 5 kilometres (3.1 mi) west of Portmahomack). The town of Tain is 8 kilometres (5.0 mi) to the east.

Scotland's north and west coasts have over 700 islands all told. Innis Mhòr is one of the few east coast islands, only 4 of which exceed 20 hectares (49 acres) in size.

The extensive tidal Whiteness Sands lie between Innis Mhòr and the Easter Ross coast, with the headland of Rubh' na h-Innse Moire lying to the west of the island. Inland there is the Morrich More, an extensive area of dune grassland with wetland communities, and a grade 1 SSSI, and RAF Tain, a bombing range on an alluvial plain known as the Fendom. The area includes the most extensive area (260 hectares (1.0 sq mi)) of salt marsh in the Highlands. The island is part of the Dornoch Firth National Scenic Area, one of 40 in Scotland.

Local birdlife includes important populations of osprey (10 pairs representing about 10% of the UK breeding population), bar-tailed godwit, greylag goose and wigeon and numerous more common species such as curlew, dunlin, oystercatcher and teal.

There are no other islands nearby, although a sandy spit to the south is marked as Innis Bheag (meaning "small island") on some maps and is also referred to as Paterson Island.
