= The Scares =

Island group in Dumfries and Galloway, Scotland

Unknown (Gaelic)
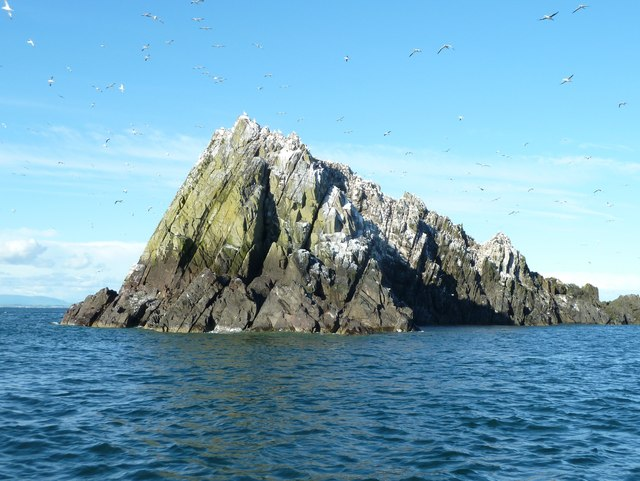
- Big Scare

Location
- Location within Scotland
- OS grid reference: NX259332
- Coordinates: 54.664°N 4.71°W

Name
- Old Norse name: Unknown

Physical geography
- Island group: Outlier
- Area: <1 ha
- Highest elevation: 21 metres (69 ft)

Administration
- Council area: Dumfries and Galloway
- Country: Scotland
- Sovereign state: United Kingdom

Demographics
- Population: Uninhabitable

The Scares or the Scare Rocks are rocky islets in Luce Bay off the coast of Dumfries and Galloway, Scotland. By far the largest is Big Scare. There is a small outlying rock to its west and three companion islets called the Little Scares are about 1 km to the north east. Big Scare is 12 kilometres (7.5 mi) south west of Port William and a similar distance east of the Mull of Galloway.

The schooner Annie Mclester was wrecked on Big Scare at an unknown date in the 19th century. On 27 January 1849 the 400 ton barque Archibald of Memel, was wrecked on the Little Scares. In September 1860 a small round-sterned four-oared boat was picked up near to Big Scare. The parent vessel had presumably been lost in the vicinity although no record of this is known.

There is an MOD firing range in the area with brightly coloured floating targets deployed. The southern limit is marked by buoys 1.75 nautical miles (3.24 kilometres; 2.01 miles) SSE of The Scares.

The islands are part of Luce Bay and Sands SAC and are leased to the Royal Society for the Protection of Birds. They have been described as an "inaccessible bird reserve" and provide nesting sites for more than 2,000 pairs of breeding northern gannets, hundreds of guillemots and smaller numbers of shags and kittiwakes.
