= Islands of Fleet =

Group of small islands in Galloway, Scotland

Coordinates: 54°48′N 4°13′W

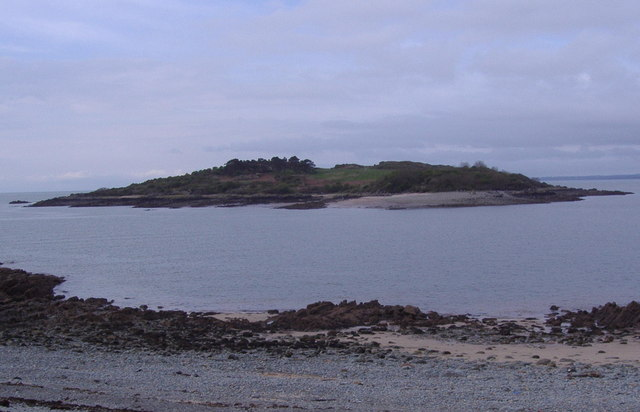
Ardwall Isle

The Islands of Fleet are a group of small islands in Galloway, Scotland. They are in Fleet Bay, which is part of Wigtown Bay, and is in turn part of the Solway Firth in the Irish Sea. There are three main islands.

- Murray Isles, owned by the National Trust for Scotland, with the small rock "Horse Mark" off it.
- Ardwall Isle (Ard Bhaile - high town), which has a cairn and the remains of a chapel on it, and has the "Old Man of Fleet" off it. The largest of the three, it is approximately 19 hectares (47 acres) in extent.
- Barlocco Island, with the "Three Brethren" off it. Barlocco Island is about 10 hectares (25 acres). It has a pebble beach where a boat can be anchored or beached. At low tide it is accessible on foot, by tractor, or quad bike. Barlocco Isle was put up for sale in April 2023 for GBP 150,000 (USD 190,000). Despite an apparent 'worldwide interest' (from Norway, Italy, Germany and the US) and a closing date for bids around 16 May 2023, there was no definitive public confirmation that the island had been sold.^{(situation as of January 2026)} This could be due to the fact that it may not be allowed to develop it, as the island (and in fact, all the Islands of Fleet) are situated within NatureScot's Borgue Coast Site of Special Scientific Interest, a government designation for “nationally important natural areas” within the United Kingdom, per the Scottish government.

Ardwall Isle, Barlocco Isle, and the Murray Isles are four of 43 tidal islands that can be walked to from the mainland of Great Britain and two of 17 that can be walked to from the Scottish mainland.

== See also ==
- List of islands of Scotland
- List of outlying islands of Scotland
