= St Kilda mouse =

St Kilda mouse may refer to:

- St Kilda field mouse
- St Kilda house mouse (extinct)
