= Mugdrum Island =

Island in the Firth of Tay, Scotland

Coordinates: 56.35606°N 3.25578°W

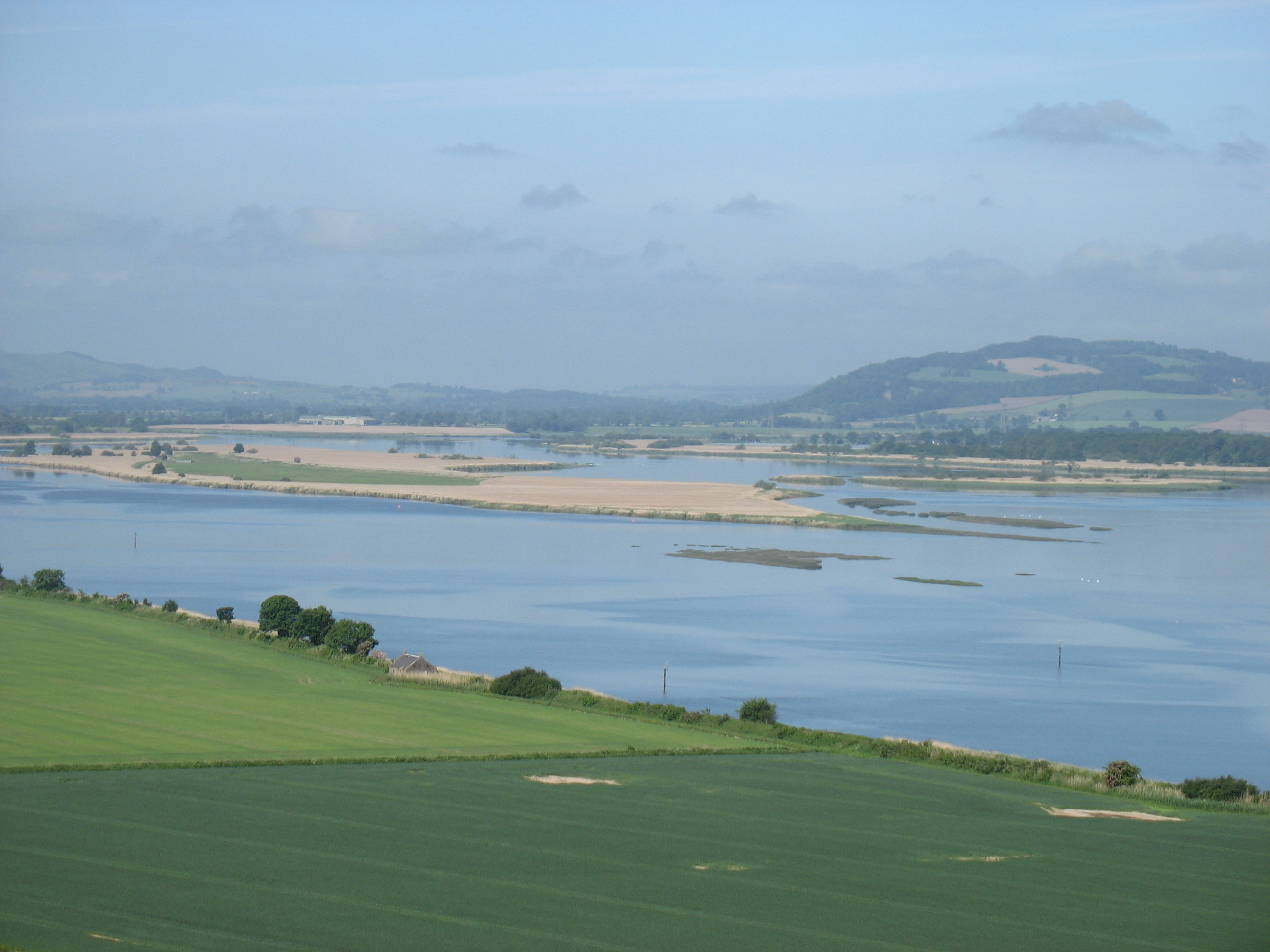
View of the island from the south side of the Tay

Mugdrum Island lies in the Firth of Tay on the east coast of Scotland, opposite the town of Newburgh in Fife. It is low-lying and reedy, and covers an area of 55.7 acres (22.5 ha). It is the only significant island in the firth. The Tay splits into two channels here, known as the North Deep and the South Deep.

== History ==
The island was once a possession of Lindores Abbey, and is referred to under the name Redinche (meaning either "red island" or "reed island") in the abbey's foundation charter. The abbey's founder David, Earl of Huntingdon, granted its monks fishing rights around the island, while retaining a fish trap in the channel separating it from the southern shore of the Firth for the exclusive use of his own household.

In the 17th century, the island became attached to the Mugdrum estate near Newburgh. The island was formerly run as a farm, growing cereals, potatoes, and turnips (as well as reeds, which were harvested for thatch). The last tenant left in 1926. It is now a nature reserve under the stewardship of the Tay Valley Wildfowlers' Association.
