= Sula Sgeir =

Island in Outer Hebrides, Scotland

Sula Sgeir or Sùlaisgeir (Gaelic)
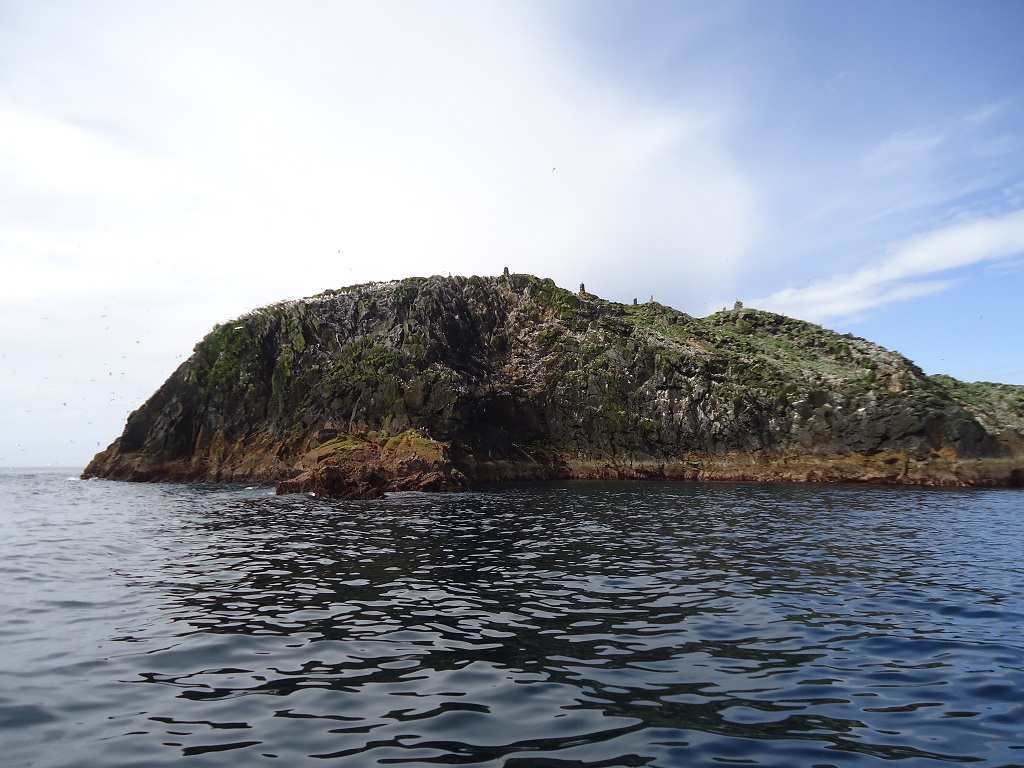

Location
- Location within Scotland
- Coordinates: 59°5′44.25″N 6°9′23.37″W

Name
- Name meaning: Gannet Skerry
- Old Norse name: Súlasker

Physical geography
- Island group: North Atlantic
- Area: 15 hectares (0.15 km^{2})
- Highest elevation: (Near Sròn na Lice) > 70 m

Administration
- Council area: Comhairle nan Eilean Siar
- Country: Scotland
- Sovereign state: United Kingdom

Demographics
- Population: 0
- Sula Sgeir Lighthouse; Comhairle Nan Eilean Siar
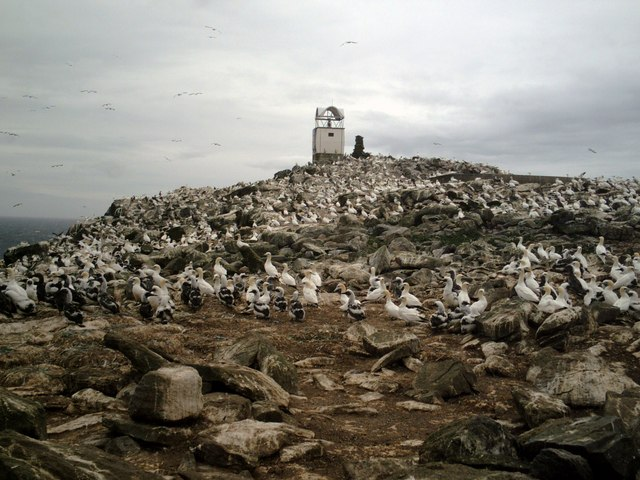
- Lighthouse and Cairn on Sulasgeir
- Coordinates: 59°5′37.47″N 6°9′31.97″W
- Foundation: concrete base
- Construction: metal tower
- Height: 5 m (16 ft)
- Shape: square parallelepiped with lantern
- Markings: white tower
- Power source: solar power
- Operator: Rona and Sula Sgeir National Nature Reserve
- Focal height: 74 m (243 ft)
- Range: 11 nmi (20 km)
- Characteristic: Fl W 15 s

Sula Sgeir is a small, uninhabited Scottish islet in the North Atlantic, 18 kilometres (9 1/2 nautical miles) west of Rona. One of the most remote islands of the British Isles, it lies approximately forty nautical miles (seventy kilometres) north of Lewis and is best known for its population of gannets. It has a narrow elongated shape running north-northeast to south-southwest, and is approximately 900 metres (980 yd) long by typically 100 metres (110 yd) wide (apart from a central headland projecting a further 100 metres (110 yd) on the easterly side).

A ruined stone bothy called Taigh Beannaichte (Blessed House) is on the east headland, Sgeir an Teampaill. A small automated lighthouse on the south end at Sròn na Lice is regularly damaged by the huge waves which break over the island during rough North Atlantic storms. Despite this, the island has diverse flora.

== Etymology ==
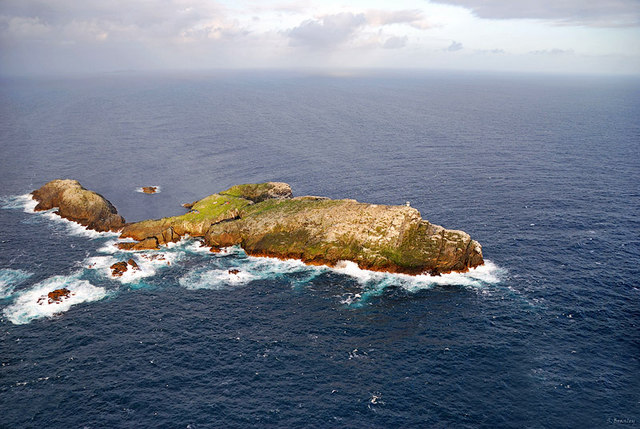
Aerial view of Sula Sgeir

The modern name is from the Old Norse súla, "gannet" and sker, "skerry". In the 16th century Dean Munro referred to the island as "Suilskeray". Macculloch's 1819 Description refers to "Sulisker", an Anglicised spelling that is still occasionally used. There is Suleskjer, a skerry in Utsira Municipality, Norway, which has a name with a similar origin; there is also a Sule Skerry in Orkney.

== Geology ==
The island is made of hard gneiss rock, the summit of a submarine mountain. Erosion causes the bedrock to shear into long flat pieces. The sea has created a series of interconnected sea caves and tunnels throughout the southern part of the island. During big Atlantic storms, waves break right over the top of Sula Sgeir.

== History ==
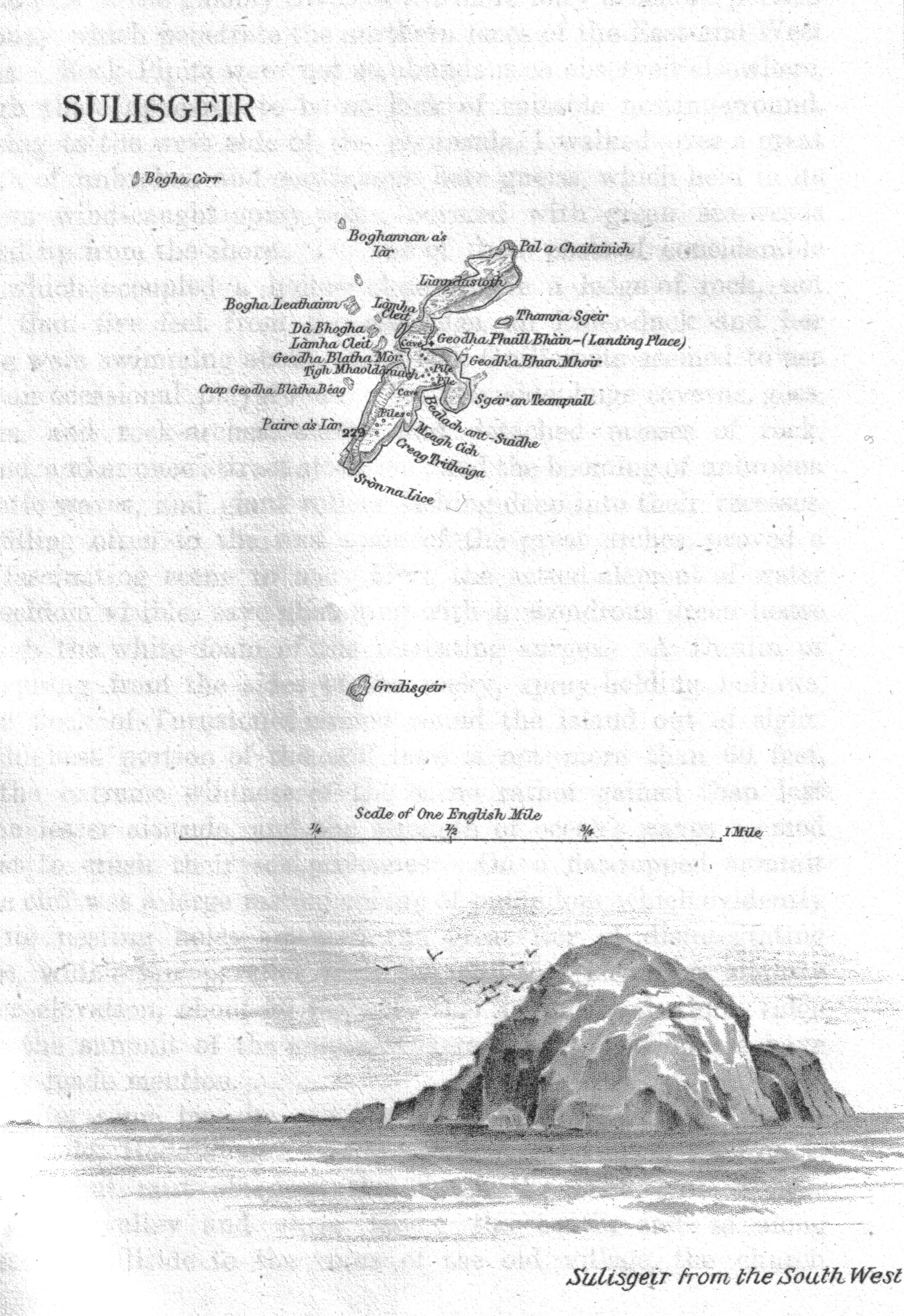
Map of Sula Sgeir.

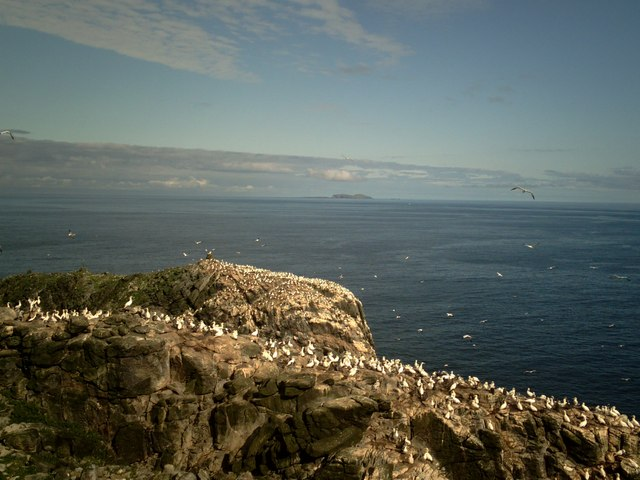
North Rona from Sula Sgeir. 14 miles between them.

Saint Brianhuil or Brenhilda, the sister of St Ronan of Iona and North Rona, is said to have lived on Sula Sgeir as a recluse. She was reportedly found dead in a bothy with a cormorant's nest in her ribcage. The poets Karla Van Vliet, David Wheatley and Cainneach Rua have written poems about her.

Sula Sgeir has a special place in the seafaring history of the men of the Ness district on Lewis. Dean Munro visited the Hebrides in 1549 and his is one of the earliest accounts written about the Western Isles.

Together with North Rona, Sula Sgeir was formerly a national nature reserve because of its importance for birdlife and grey seal breeding. It remains a protected area for nature and is a Site of Special Scientific Interest and a Special Protection Area.

Sula Sgeir, with North Rona, historically formed part of the Barvas estate on Lewis, but a community buy-out of the estate from the Duckworth family in 2016 did not include the two islands, which would apparently have increased the purchase price by £80,000.

== Hunting wild fowl ==
Munro's description of Sula Sgeir mentions that the men of Ness sailed in their small craft to "fetche hame thair boatful of dry wild fowls with wild fowl fedderi". How long before 1549 the Nessmen sailed to Sula Sgeir each year to collect the young gannets for food and feathers is not known, but it may be assumed that it was a tradition for centuries. That tradition is still carried on today. A 1797 census report written by the Reverend Donald McDonald states:

"There is in Ness a most venturous set of people who for a few years back, at the hazard of their lives, went there in an open six-oared boat without even the aid of a compass."

The flesh of the young gannet or guga is regarded as a delicacy in Ness today, though, for others, it is an acquired taste. It was a popular meat in earlier times in Scotland. In the sixteenth century it was served at the tables of Scots kings and was a favourite with the wealthy as a ’whet’ or appetizer before main meals.

== Guga hunt ==
In the autumn of each year, a group of 10 Nessmen sail to Sula Sgeir to kill a maximum of 2,000 young birds, a limit later lowered to 500. They set up residence for about two weeks in stone bothys. Working in pairs, the men take the fledglings from their nests with poles, catching them around the neck with a rope noose, then kill the birds with a blow to the head. The demand is often so great that the birds have to be rationed. In 2009, a single guga fetched £16. 1953 saw the last journey under sail for the guga hunt, thereafter a fishing trawler was used, although it was still a five-hour trip.

=== Licensing ===
The Sula Sgeir hunt, which would otherwise be illegal under the Wildlife and Countryside Act 1981, receives an annual licence from the government, which allows it to continue. Scottish Natural Heritage (NatureScot), which is now responsible for granting the licence, states that the hunt is sustainable, although it has been criticised by animal welfare groups. The Scottish SPCA describes it as "barbaric and inhumane" and believes it causes unnecessary suffering to the birds, with many taking several blows to be killed.

In 2025, NatureScot granted a licence for the hunt with a limit of 500 birds, this being the first licensed resumption of the hunt since 2021. Previously the standard number licensed had been 2,000 birds. In 2026, two men were arrested after staging a protest on the roof of NatureScot's headquarters in Inverness against the guga hunt.

In August 2026, NatureScot refused the licence application for that year's hunt, citing concerns about the impact on the local gannet population.

== Fauna ==
There are some 5,000 breeding pairs of gannets on Sula Sgeir, which they share with other bird species such as black-legged kittiwakes, common guillemots, puffins, northern fulmars and in the summers of 2005 to 2007 a black-browed Albatross was resident in the gannet colony.

=== Important Bird Area ===
The island has been designated an Important Bird Area (IBA) by BirdLife International because it supports breeding populations of several species of seabirds.

== Media and the arts ==
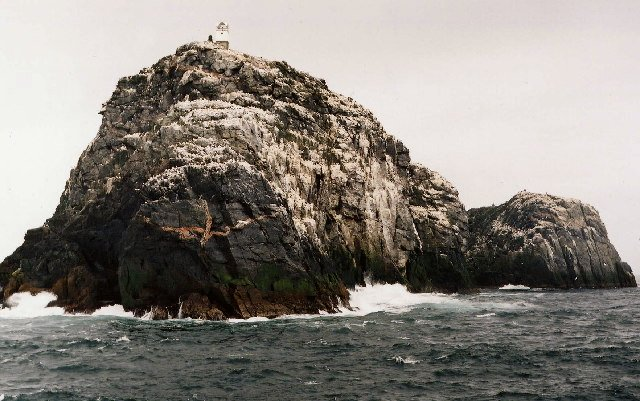
Sula Sgeir Lighthouse stands on the south-west part of the island.

- In 2009, director Mike Day sailed with the guga hunters to Sula Sgeir and filmed on the island over 10 days. The resulting film was commissioned by BBC Scotland and broadcast in January 2011.
- Scottish writer Peter May uses the setting of Sula Sgeir describing the annual expedition in his crime story The Blackhouse in 2011 (first published in a French translation in 2009).
- Robert Macfarlane describes the hunt at Sula Sgeir in his book The Old Ways: A Journey on Foot. He does not participate in the hunt, but circumnavigates the rock in a small craft at the same time as the arrival of the hunters.
- In 2018, BBC Alba aired Sulasgeir: An t-Sealg/The Hunt, a Gaelic-language documentary about the traditional annual guga hunt held on Sulasgeir by members of the community of Ness on Lewis.

== See also ==
- North Rona
- List of outlying islands of Scotland
- List of lighthouses in Scotland
- List of Northern Lighthouse Board lighthouses
- List of Important Bird Areas in the United Kingdom
