= Eilean Choraidh =

Island in Loch Eriboll, north coast of Scotland

Eilean Choraidh (Gaelic)
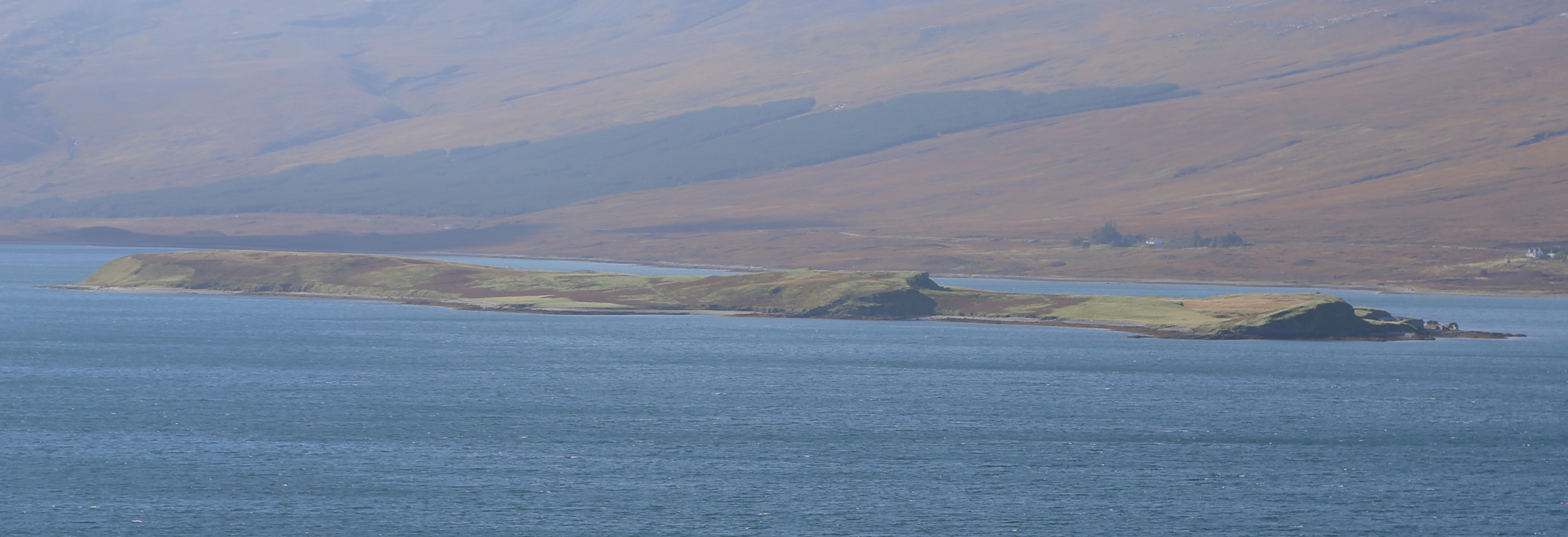

Location
- Eilean Choraidh shown within Highland Scotland
- OS grid reference: NC421580
- Coordinates: 58.482°N 4.709°W

Physical geography
- Island group: Outlier
- Area: 26 ha
- Highest elevation: 26 m

Administration
- Council area: Highland
- Country: Scotland
- Sovereign state: United Kingdom

Demographics
- Population rank: n/a

Eilean Choraidh, also known as Horse Island is an island in Loch Eriboll in Sutherland on the north coast of Scotland. It is about 26 hectares (64 acres) in extent and the highest point is 26 metres (85 ft) above sea level.

During the 19th century the Reay estate quarried lime from Eilean Choraidh, treated it in kilns on the nearby peninsula of Ard Neakie, and exported it by ship.

The census of 1931 records a single male inhabitant, and there has been no indication of any permanent residents since then. This may be partly because Eilean Choraidh was used as a representation of the German battleship Tirpitz for target practice by Mosquito bombers of the Royal Air Force during World War II. The Ordnance Survey indicate the presence of two ruined buildings, one in the centre of the island north of a long wall that runs east to west and another at the north end. Today, the island is used for grazing sheep.

A variety of wild mammals are present including otters, grey seals and cetaceans. Beds of maerl, a corraline algae that has been identified as a priority habitat in the UK Biodiversity Action Plan, has been recorded in the channels on either side of Eilean Choraidh. The sea pen, Virgularia mirabilis is also present in the inner loch.
