= Morrich More =

Area of dune grassland with wetland communities on the shore of Scotland

Coordinates: 57°50′7″N 3°57′46″W

Morrich More is an extensive area of dune grassland with wetland communities, on the southern shore of the Dornoch Firth, Scotland.

Morrich More lies east of Tain, on the southern shore of the Dornoch Firth, Scotland. Offshore lie extensive areas of intertidal sandflat, including the tidal island of Innis Mhòr and the sand spit Paterson Island (Scottish Gaelic: Innis Bheag) which provide shelter. The area includes the most extensive area (260 hectares (1.0 sq mi)) of salt marsh in the Highlands.

== Designations ==
Morrich More is a Site of Special Scientific Interest and forms part a Special Area of Conservation with Dornoch Firth.

Morrich More falls within the Dornoch Firth and Loch Fleet Special Protection Area, one of the best examples of a large complex estuary in northwest Europe, relatively unaffected by industrial development. Extensive sand-flats and mud-flats are backed by salt marsh and sand dunes with transitions to dune heath and Alder (Alnus glutinosa) woodland. The tidal flats support internationally important numbers of waterbirds on migration and in winter, and are the most northerly and substantial extent of intertidal habitat for wintering waterbirds in Europe.

The area is described as:

one of the most outstanding coastal sites in Britain, especially noteworthy for the development of an extensive low-level sandy plain on which a set of parabolic dunes are superimposed.
