= North Rona =

Uninhabited Scottish island

Rona
Rònaigh (Gaelic)
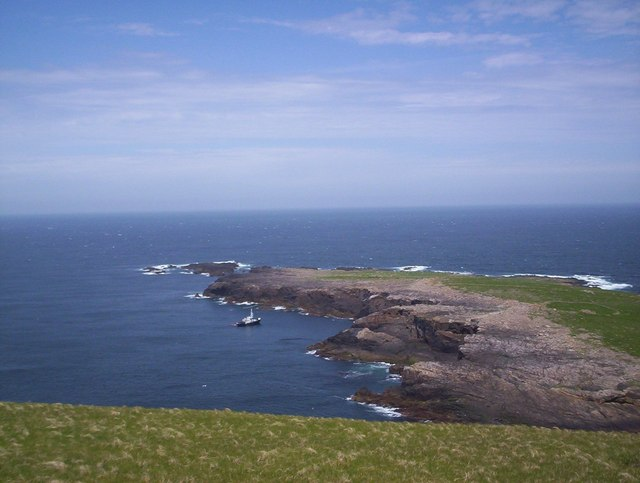

Location
- Location within Scotland
- OS grid reference: HW811323
- Coordinates: 59.12°N 5.82°W

Name
- Gaelic pronunciation: [ˈrˠɔːnaj]
- Name meaning: possibly "seal island"
- Old Norse name: hraun-øy?

Physical geography
- Island group: North Atlantic
- Area: 109 ha (270 acres)
- Area rank: 145
- Highest elevation: Tobha Rònaigh, 108 m (354 ft)

Administration
- Council area: Comhairle nan Eilean Siar
- Country: Scotland
- Sovereign state: United Kingdom

Demographics
- Population: 0

Rona (Scottish Gaelic: Rònaigh) is an uninhabited Scottish island in the North Atlantic. It is often referred to as North Rona to distinguish it from the island of South Rona in the Inner Hebrides. It has an area of 109 hectares (270 acres) and a maximum elevation of 108 metres (354 ft). (Note: Boyd (1986) gives the height as 116 metres (381 feet) and the area as 120 acres (49 hectares).)

It is the most isolated island in the British Isles to have been inhabited on a long-term basis.

Rona is included within the historic county of Ross-shire. Although uninhabited, the island (along with Sula Sgeir) is included in the Western Isles Council electoral ward of An Taobh Siar agus Nis, the Scottish Parliament constituency of Na h-Eileanan an Iar, the electoral region of Highlands and Islands, and the UK Parliament constituency of Na h-Eileanan an lar.

== Etymology ==
The name "Rona" may come from hraun-øy, Old Norse for "rough island", or a combination of ròn and øy, Gaelic and Old Norse for "seal" and "island" respectively. Alternatively, it may have been named after St Rónán of Iona. The English language qualifier "North" is sometimes used to distinguish the island from Rona off Skye. In Gaelic, it is also known as Rònaigh an Daimh, which is literally "Rona of the stag", but may be derived from Rònaigh an Taibh, containing the genitive singular of the Gaelic word tabh, meaning "ocean", and conveying the meaning "Rona of the Atlantic".

== Geography ==
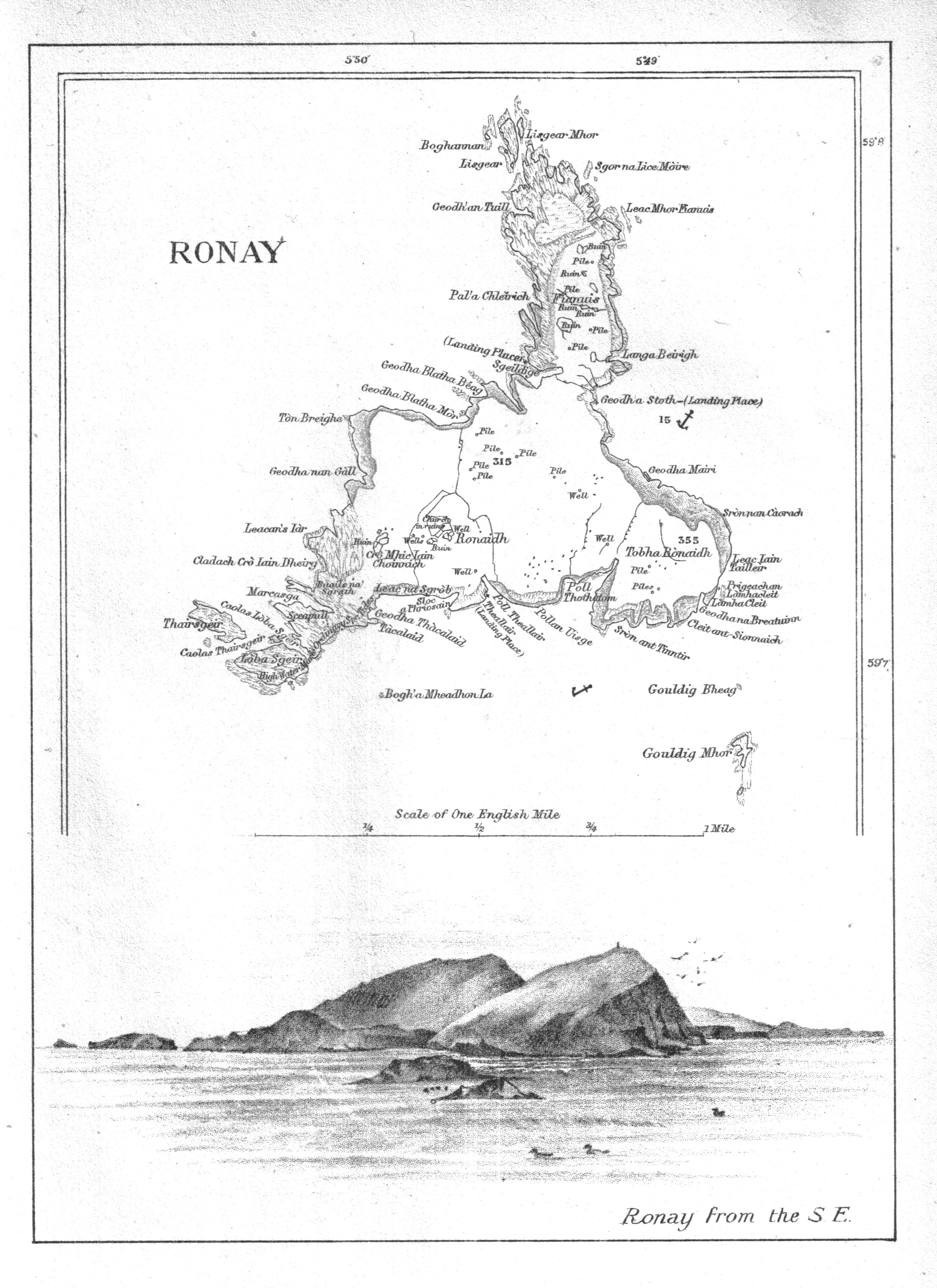
Map of Rona from A Vertebrate Fauna of the Outer Hebrides

The island lies 71 kilometres (38 nautical miles) northwest of Cape Wrath, the same distance north-northeast of the Butt of Lewis, and 16 kilometres (8 1/2 nmi) east of Sula Sgeir. More remote than St Kilda, it is the most isolated island in the British Isles to have been inhabited on a long-term basis.

It is also the closest neighbour of the Faroe Islands, which are 260 kilometres (140 nautical miles) northwest. By comparison, the distances to its own national capitals are notably longer: 380 kilometres (210 nautical miles) to Edinburgh and 930 kilometres (500 nautical miles) to London.

The geological structure of the island is that of hornblende schist and gneiss with pegmatite intrusions.

== History ==
=== 8th to 18th centuries ===
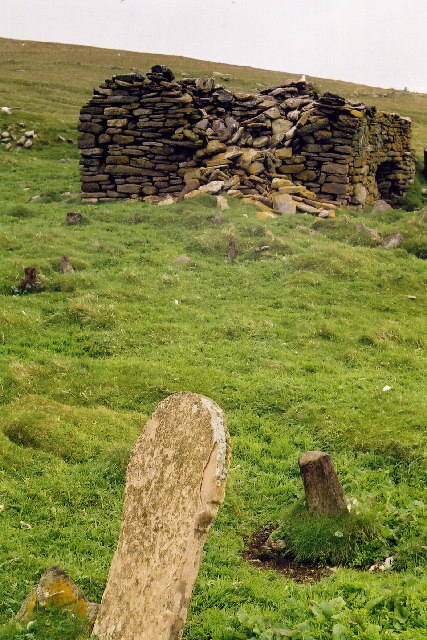
The remains of St Ronan's Church (Teampall Naoimh Ronain)

St. Ronan is said to have been the first inhabitant. St Ronan founded a small monastic community on the island and was reputedly buried there along with his sister Mionagan. His other sister, Saint Brianuil (Brenhilda), and Saint Flannan went to live on other islands.

A tiny early Christian oratory, which may date as early as the eighth century and is built of unmortared stone, survives virtually complete on the island – the best-preserved structure of this type in Scotland. A number of simple cross-slabs of early medieval date are preserved within the structure, probably the grave markers of Dark Age monks or hermits from Scotland or Ireland.

Writing in the 16th century Dean Monro wrote:

Towards the north northeist from Lewis, three score myles of sea, lyes ane little ile callit Ronay, laiche maine lande, inhabit and manurit be simple people, scant of ony religione. This ile is uther haffe myle lange, and haffe myle braide; aboundance of corne growes on it by delving onlie, aboundance of clover gerse for sheipe. Ther is an certain number of ky and sheipe ordainit for this ile be ther awin ald right, extending to sa maney as may be sustainit upon the said gerssing, and the countrey is so fertill of gerssing, that the super-excrescens of the said ky and schiepe baith feidis them in flesche, and als payes ther dewties with the samen for the maist pairt. Within this ile there is sic faire whyte beir meal made like flour, and quhen they slay their sheipe, they slay them belly flaught, and stuffes ther skins fresche of the bear meil, and send their dewties be a servant of M’Cloyd of Lewis, with certain reistit muttan, and mony reistit foulis. Within this ile there is ane chapell, callit St. Ronay’s chapell, unto quhilk chapell, as the ancients of the country alledges, they leave an spaid and ane shuil, quhen any man dies, and upon the morrow findes the place of the grave markit with an spaid, as they alledge. In this ile they use to take maney quhaills and uther grate fisches. (Note: Translation from Scots: Towards the north-northeast from Lewis, three score miles of sea [distant], lies a little isle called Ronay, [it is] low-lying land, inhabited and tilled by simple people, lacking any religion. This isle is half a mile long and half a mile broad; an abundance of corn grows on it by delving only, [and there is an] abundance of clover grass for sheep. There is a certain number of cattle and sheep destined for this isle by their owners’ old rights, extending to so many as may be sustained upon the said grass, and the country is so fertile that the excretions of the said cattle and sheep both feeds them in flesh, and also pays their dues with the same for the most part. Within this isle there is such fair white bere meal made like flour, and when they slay their sheep, they slay them belly pared open(?), and stuff their skins with fresh bere meal, and send their dues by a servant of MacLeod of Lewis, with certain cured mutton, and many cured fowls. Within this isle there is a chapel, called St. Ronay’s chapel, in which, as the old people of the country say, they leave a spade and a shovel when any man dies, and upon the morrow find the place of the grave marked with a spade, so they allege. In this isle they use[d] to take many whales(?) and other large fish.)

In 1680 Martin Martin recorded the visit of Rev. Daniel Morison to the island. "Upon my landing the natives received me very affectionately, and addressed me with their usual salutation to a stranger: 'God save you, pilgrim, you are heartily welcome here; for we have had repeated apparitions of your person among us (after the manner of the second sight), and we heartily congratulate your arrival in this our remote country.'" Morison also reported that there were five families living there who "take their surname from the colour of the sky, rainbow, and clouds" and that "they repeat the Lord’s Prayer, Creed, and Ten Commandments in the chapel every Sunday morning. They have cows, sheep, barley and oats, and live a harmless life, being perfectly ignorant of most of those vices that abound in the world. They know nothing of money or gold, having no occasion for either."

The island continued to be inhabited until the entire population of thirty died shortly after 1685. This was in part due to an infestation by rats, probably the black rat (Rattus rattus), which reached the island after a shipwreck. The rats raided the food stocks of barley meal, and it is possible that the inhabitants starved to death, although plague may have been a contributory factor. A contributory factor was that a few months after the infestation, "some seamen landed there, who robbed the poor people of their bull." This all occurred in a year in which it is reported that no further ships reached the remote island to supply or trade. The rats themselves eventually starved to death, as the huge swells the island experiences prevented their hunting along the rocky shores.

The island was resettled, but again largely depopulated due to a boating accident, after which it remained home to a succession of shepherds and their families. The island had a population of nine in 1764 and "one family" in 1796.

=== Victorian era ===
A Dr. MacCulloch landed on the island in 1815 and recorded that the inhabitants were the shepherd, Kenneth MacCagie, his wife and three children and his elderly mother living in a house that was largely underground. However, when he landed they ran and hid for they had not had a visitor for seven years and were afraid that MacCulloch and his party were "pirates or Americans".

Scottish Victorian historian John Swinburne recorded that on one occasion between 1811 and 1847, a crew from Ness in Lewis had their boat wrecked in landing at Sula Sgeir in the month of June, and lived on the island for several weeks, sustaining themselves on the flesh of birds. Captain Benjamin Oliver, who commanded the revenue cruiser Prince of Wales, visited Sula Sgeir in the month of August to look for the boat and "found the wreck of it, also an oar on end with an old pair of canvas trousers on it, and over the remains of a fire a pot containing birds' flesh; but there being no trace of the men, it was thought they must have been picked up by a passing vessel."

Nothing further was heard of them until October of that year, when a Russian vessel on her homeward voyage met a Stornoway craft in Orkney "and informed the crew of the latter that they had taken the men off Sula Sgeir and landed them in Rona." Captain Oliver immediately went to North Rona and "found the crew consuming the last barrel of potatoes which the poor shepherd had". He took away the crew and left the shepherd with "sufficient provision for the winter." Swinburne's research found that the last family to live on Rona "was that of a shepherd named Donald M'Leod, otherwise the 'King of Rona', who returned to Lewis in 1844." Sir James Matheson, who bought Lewis in 1844, offered the island to the Government for use as a penal settlement. The offer was refused.

Although farmers from Lewis have continued to graze sheep on Rona ever since then, the island has remained uninhabited, apart from a short period in 1884–85. In June 1884, two men from Lewis, Malcolm MacDonald and Murdo Mackay, having reportedly had a dispute with the minister of their local church, went to stay on Rona to look after the sheep. In August, boatmen who had called at the island reported that the men were well and in good spirits, and had refused offers to take them back to Lewis. In April 1885, the next people to visit Rona found that the two men had died during the winter.

=== U-boat landings ===
During World War I, the commander of German U-boat U-90, Walter Remy, stopped his submarine at North Rona during each of his wartime patrols, weather permitting, and sent crewmen onto the island to shoot sheep to obtain mutton for on-board consumption. Evidence for this was provided by American prisoner of war Edouard Izac who was captured from a lifeboat after the sinking of the troopship USS President Lincoln on 31 May 1918; U-90 was in service from August 1917 onwards and had previously shelled the Hirta radio station on St Kilda on 15 May 1918.

Captain Remy also commanded U-24 from June 1916 to July 1917. Stuart Crawford, writing for the UK Defence Journal, notes that the war diary of U-90 "stated that it shot 7 sheep to augment crew rations on the 5th June 1918"; he also recalls a local story from Islay that an unnamed German tourist visiting in 1921 spoke of landing several times at Glas Uig (near Ardtalla) whilst serving in a U-boat.

In his memoirs written after the war, Captain Johannes Spiess, who had commanded a number of U-boats, wrote that during one of his patrols, on April 22nd 1918, he stopped U-19 at North Rona. Just like captain Remy, Spiess sent a number of his crew to hunt for sheep to obtain mutton. He had also ordered the party to go on the top cliff of the island to scout for any enemy vessels which could have been in the area.

In terms of the probability of other landings, Rona was undefended and over 300 U-boats were active in the war, mostly in the North Atlantic; however, 200 were lost in action and many personal accounts from submarine crewmen and officers were therefore not recorded for history.

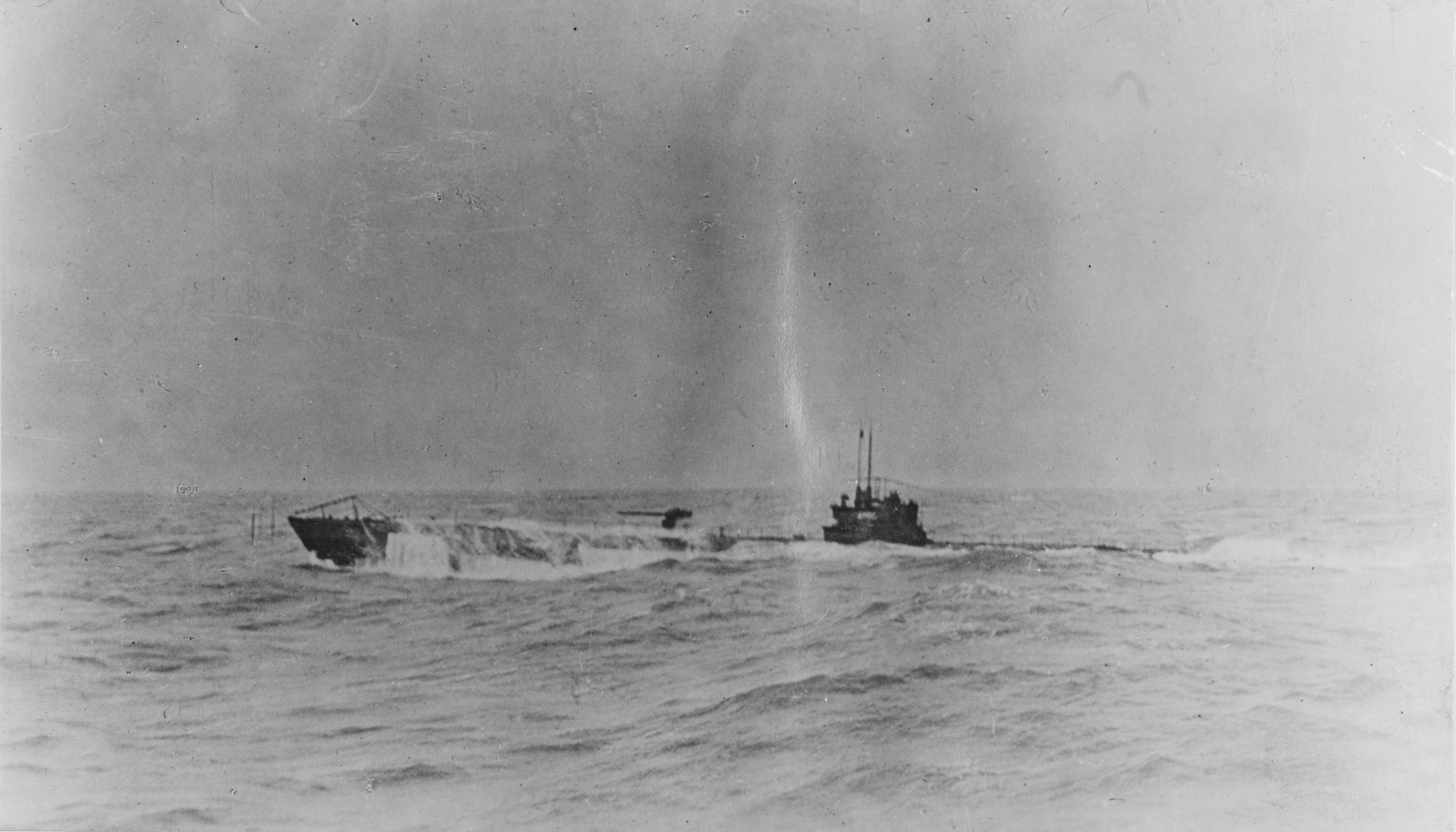
U-90 at sea in 1918.

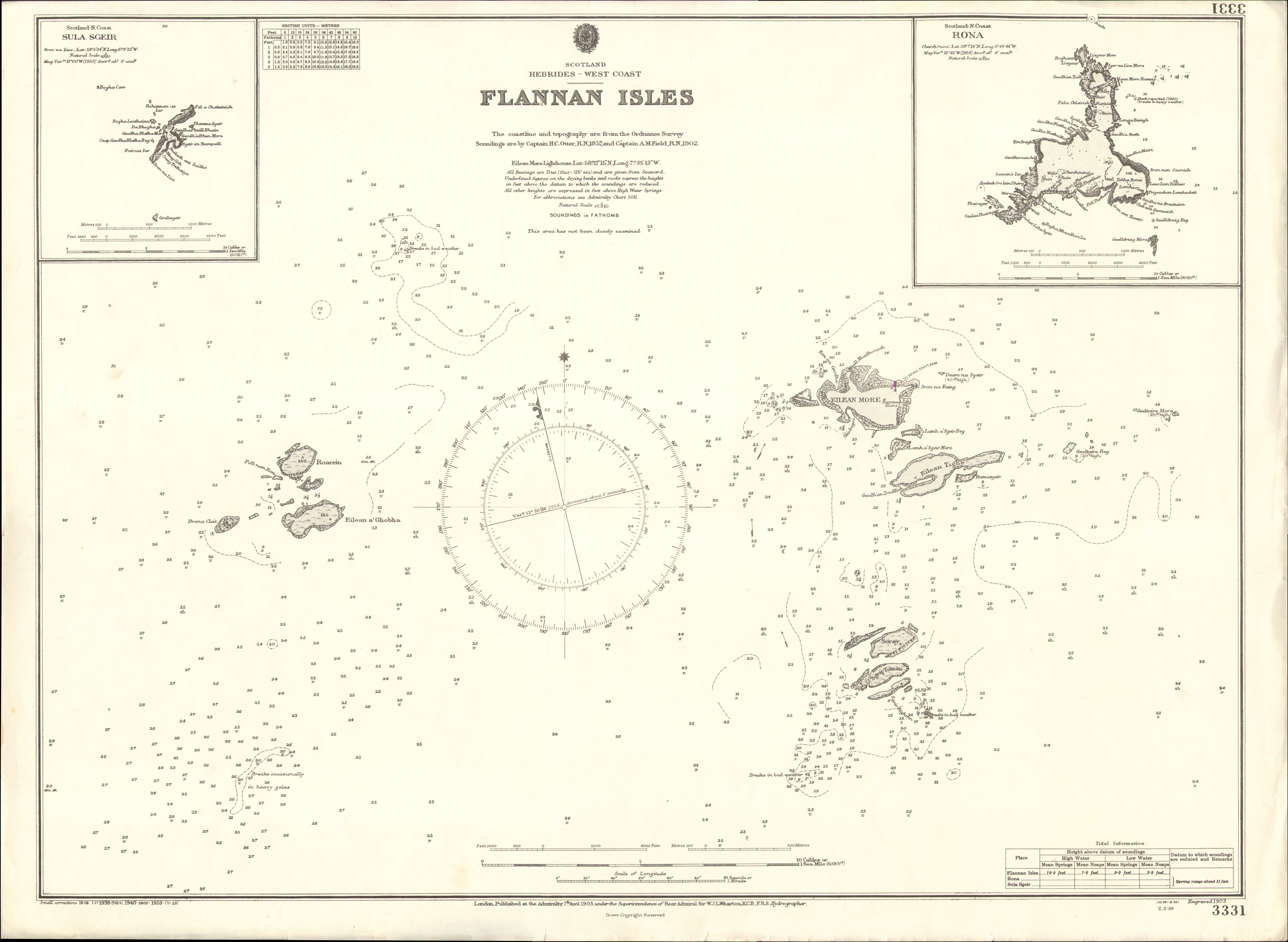
An Admiralty Chart of the Flannan Islands, featuring North Rona.

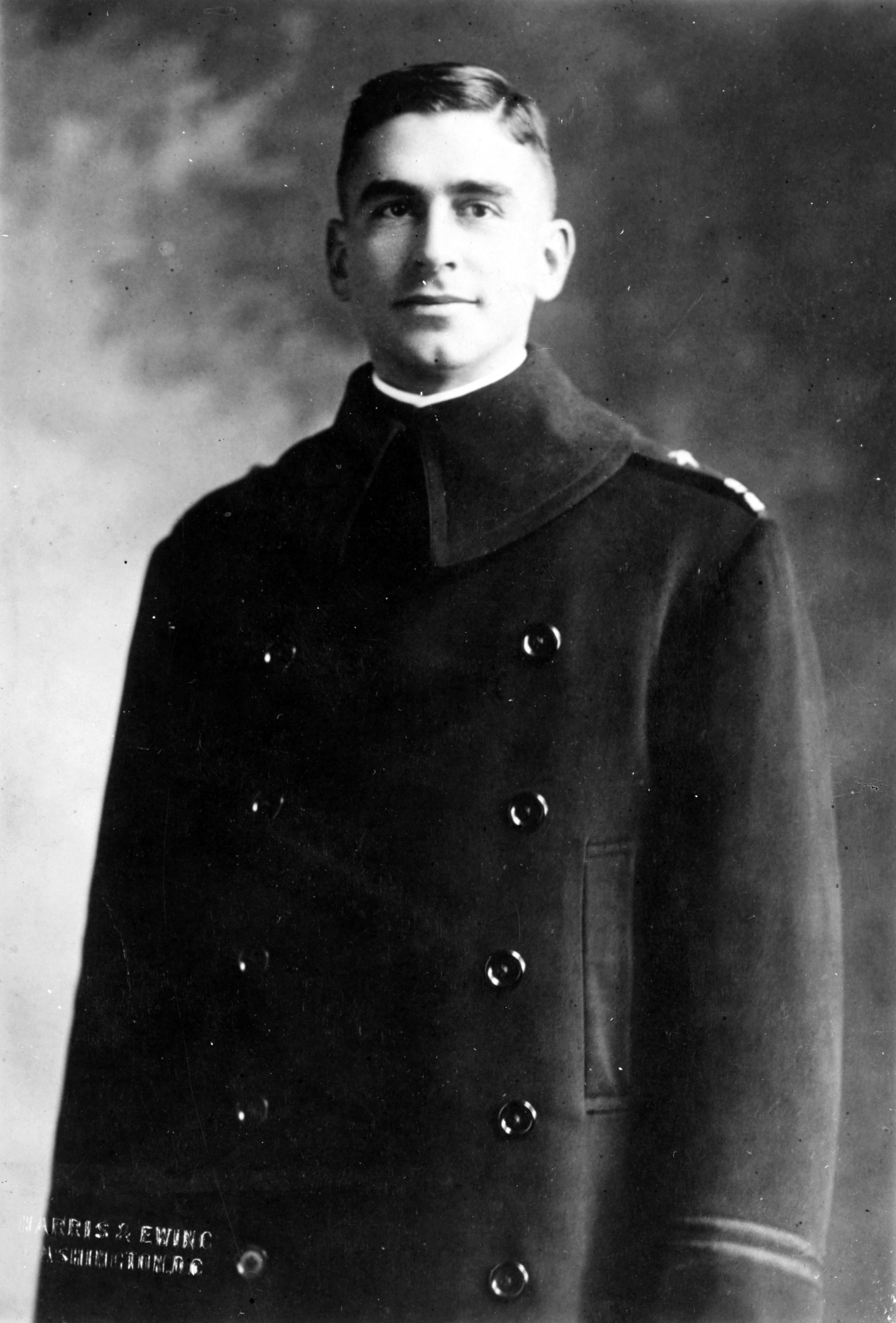
US Navy Lieutenant Edouard Izac, who recorded the report of the landing on Rona.

=== Modern history ===
The island was occupied temporarily in 1938 and 1939 by author and conservationist Frank Fraser Darling with his wife Bobbie and their son Alasdair, while they studied the grey seals and the breeding seabirds.

Since 1984, Rona has hosted an automatic light beacon, remotely monitored by the Northern Lighthouse Board and constructed in 1984.

In Island at the edge of the world, published in 2006, the poet Kathleen Jamie describes a visit to the island, as well as in an essay in her collection Sightlines.

The governance of Rona has changed from Ross-shire to Ross and Cromarty in 1890, and to the Western Isles in 1975, and from the Ross and Cromarty parliamentary constituency to the Western Isles (Na h-Eileanan an Iar) constituency in 1918, although without noticeable change due to its remoteness and lack of population. With a previous history of habitation from Scotland, it has not been necessary for the UK to claim Rona as territory, as happened for Rockall under the Island of Rockall Act 1972 and 1955 Royal Warrant. Rockall and St Kilda are also located within the Western Isles for governance purposes.

North Rona, with Sula Sgeir, formed part of the Barvas estate based on Lewis. A community buy-out of the estate in 2016 did not include the two islands, which would have increased the purchase price by £80,000, and the islands remained in the hands of the Duckworth family.

== Environment ==
Together with Sula Sgeir, the island was formerly managed by Scottish Natural Heritage as a nature reserve, for its important grey seal and seabird colonies. These include the European storm-petrel and the larger Leach's storm-petrel, for which North Rona is an important breeding locality. It remains a protected area for nature, and is a Site of Special Scientific Interest and a Special Protection Area. Bog cotton is a common flowering plant.

=== Important Bird Area ===
The island has been designated an Important Bird Area (IBA) by BirdLife International because it supports breeding populations of several species of seabirds.

== North Rona Lighthouse ==
North Rona Lighthouse
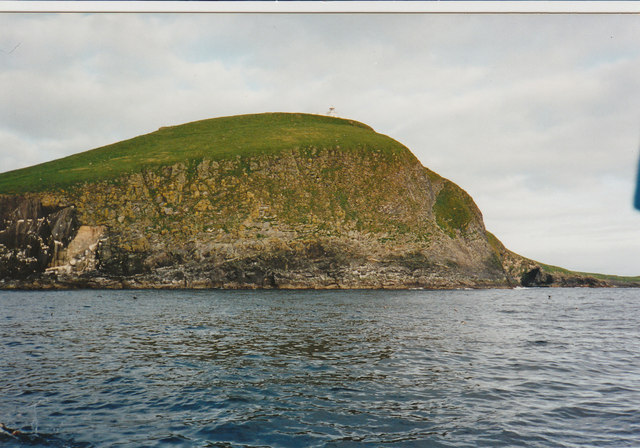
- North Rona
- Location: North Rona, Outer Hebrides, United Kingdom
- OS grid: HW8175332285
- Coordinates: 59°07′17″N 5°48′53″W

Tower
- Constructed: 1984
- Construction: masonry building
- Automated: 1984
- Height: 13 m (43 ft)
- Shape: parallelepiped building with lantern on the roof
- Markings: white building
- Power source: solar power
- Operator: Rona and Sula Sgeir National Nature Reserve

Light
- Focal height: 114 m (374 ft)
- Range: 22 nmi (41 km; 25 mi)
- Characteristic: Fl (3) W 20 s

The North Rona Lighthouse is managed by the Northern Lighthouse Board. Constructed in 1984, the light is atop a square white tower which is 9m high.

== Gallery ==
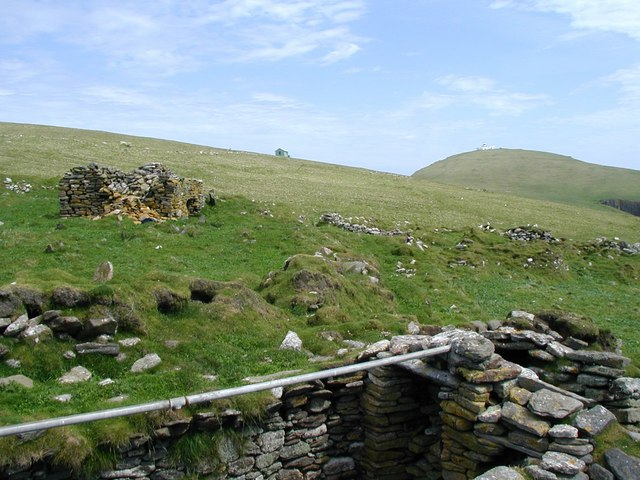
Part of the remains of St Ronan's cell. (Note: The small hut on the horizon was used as temporary living accommodation by scientists from Durham University. In the far distance is the lighthouse.)

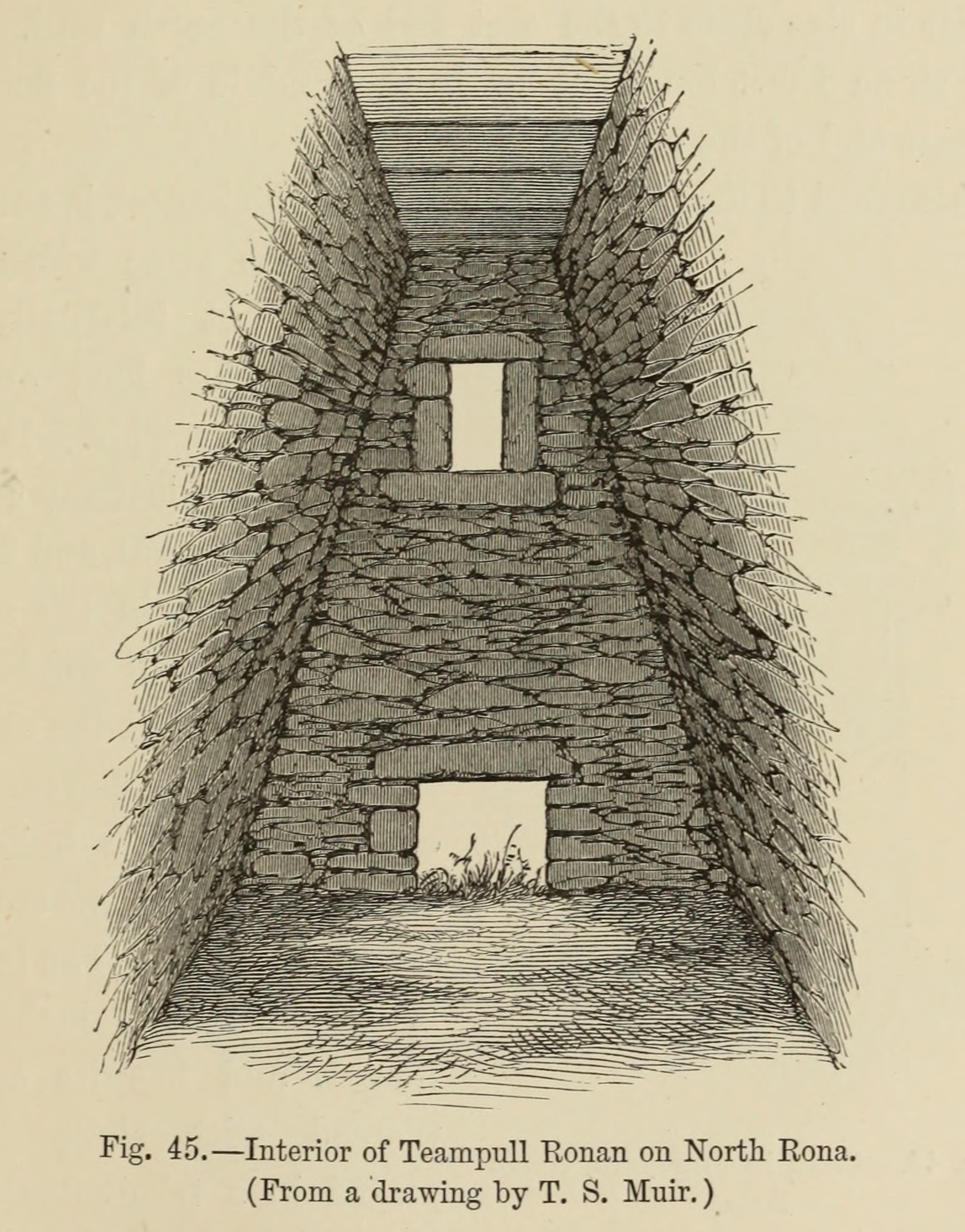
The interior of St Ronan's Church, in Scotland in Early Christian Times (1881).

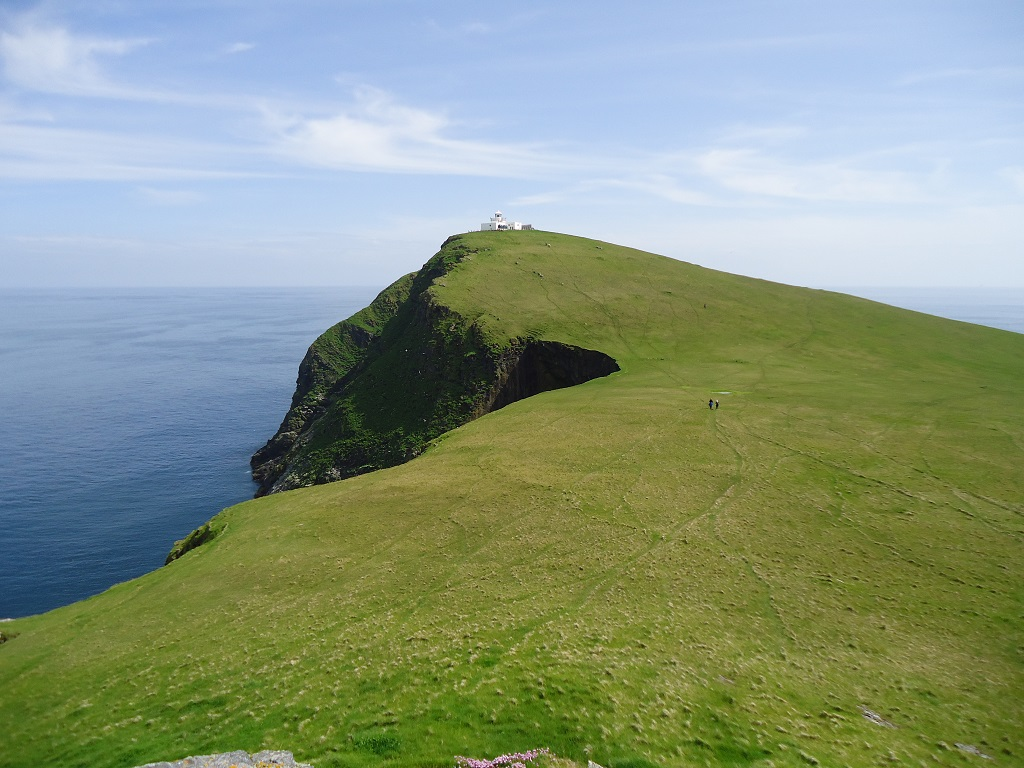
A view towards the lighthouse.

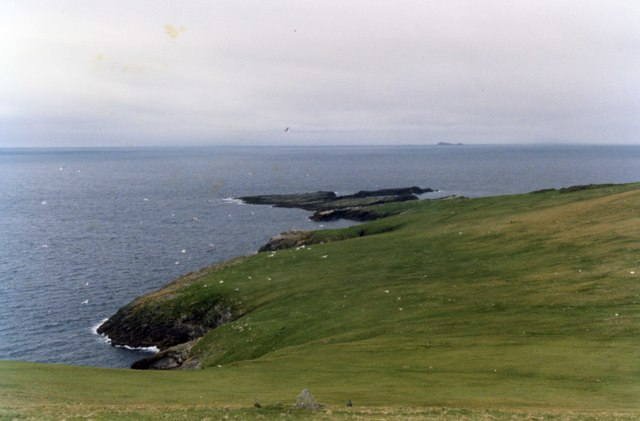
Sula Sgeir from North Rona.

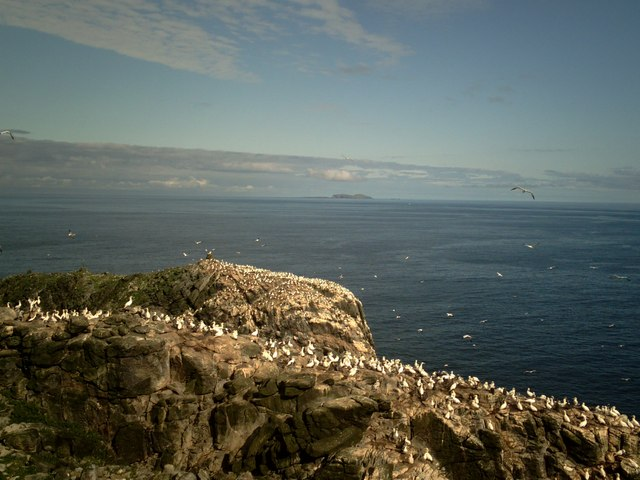
North Rona from Sula Sgeir. 14 miles between them.

== See also ==
- List of islands in Scotland
- List of lighthouses in Scotland
- List of Northern Lighthouse Board lighthouses
- List of outlying islands of Scotland
