= Stac Dona =

Sea stack in St Kilda, Scotland

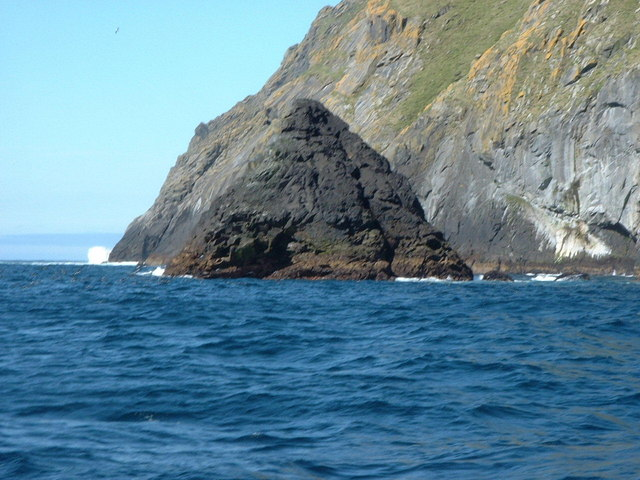
- Interactive map of Stac Dona

Geography
- Location: St Kilda
- OS grid reference: NA069010
- Type: Stack
- Archipelago: St Kilda
- Highest elevation: 27 m (89 ft)

Stac Dona (Scottish Gaelic: "bad stack") is a sea stack in the St Kilda archipelago, Outer Hebrides, Scotland. It is between the islands of Hirta and Soay and has a height of 27 meters. The name is from Scottish Gaelic, literally meaning "bad stack". This was due to the low number of birds the St. Kildans were able to collect from it.

== History ==
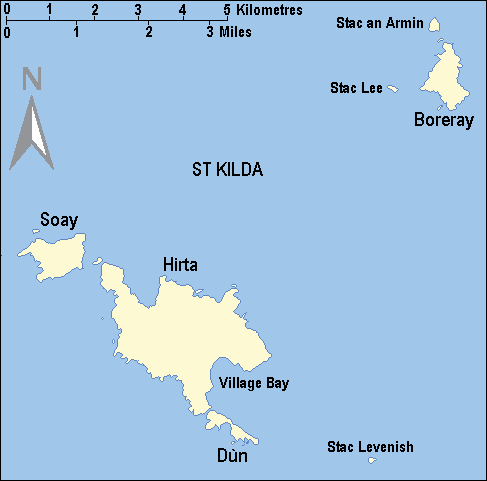
Map of The St Kilda archipelago

The stack has never been inhabited but has contributed to the local economy by supplying the St Kildans with sea birds and their eggs. In the 19th century the St Kildans were observed collecting eggs from here in baskets like flat-bottomed bee hives, each of 17 baskets holding about 400 guillemot eggs.

Stac Dona was seen by the St Kildans as inferior to other stacks (namely, Stac Biorach and Stac Shoaigh, both of which are directly adjacent to Stac Dona; and much larger) as it generally did not provide enough birds or eggs to sustain the St Kildans. In acknowledgement of this the St. Kildans aptly named the stack Stac Dona, which translated from Scottish Gaelic to "bad stack".

== Geology ==
Stac Dona is a remnant of a massive Palaeogene ring volcano that was active approximately 55 to 60 million years ago. It is composed of igneous breccia.

== In popular culture ==
- Stac Dona is the title of a track on the album "The Lost Songs of St Kilda" released in 2016 by James MacMillan and Trevor Morrison. The album contains traditional melodies that were preserved by Morrison, a retired teacher, who learned them as a child from a former resident of the islands.

== See also ==
- List of sea stacks in Scotland
