= SS Kumu =

Steam trawler that foundered in Glen Bay, St. Kilda

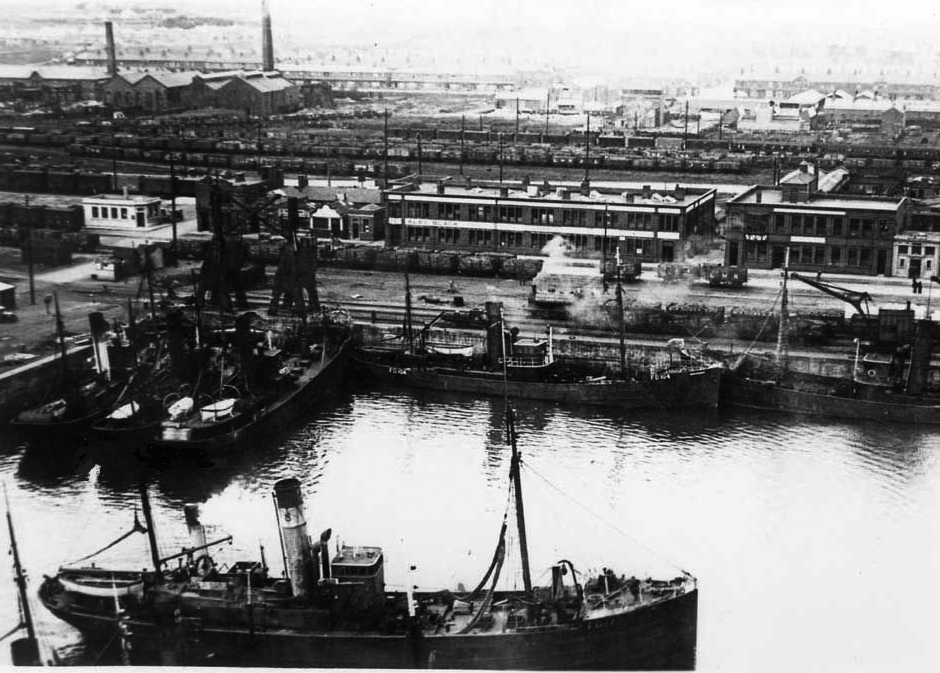
- SS Kumu in 1913

History

United Kingdom
- Name: Kumu
- Owner: Clifton Steam Trawlers Ltd.
- Operator: Joseph and Ernest Taylor
- Builder: John Duthie & Co. Ltd., Aberdeen
- Launched: 9 April 1913
- In service: 1913
- Out of service: 21 February 1929
- Identification: UK official number 132416; Fishing number FD176
- Fate: Foundered in Glen Bay, St Kilda, 21 February 1929, 57°49.535′N 8°36.128′W

General characteristics
- Type: Fishing trawler
- Tonnage: 315 GRT, 129 NRT
- Length: 130.0 ft (39.6 m)
- Beam: 23.6 ft (7.2 m)
- Depth: 13.3 ft (4.1 m)
- Installed power: 1 × triple-expansion steam engine by James Abernethy & Co. Ltd., Aberdeen; 69 RHP
- Propulsion: 1 × screw propeller
- Crew: 11

SS Kumu was a British steam trawler. On 20 February 1929, she foundered off Soay, St Kilda, Scotland, in thick fog, before eventually sinking in Glen Bay, Hirta.

== Construction and early career ==
Kumu was a steel-hulled steam trawler that was built by the Torry yard of John Duthie & Co. Ltd, Aberdeen (Yard No. 386) and launched on 9 April 1913. Her power source was a triple expansion engine that provided an output of 69 registered horsepower. The ship entered service for Clifton Steam Trawlers Ltd. and had a registration at Fleetwood under FD176.

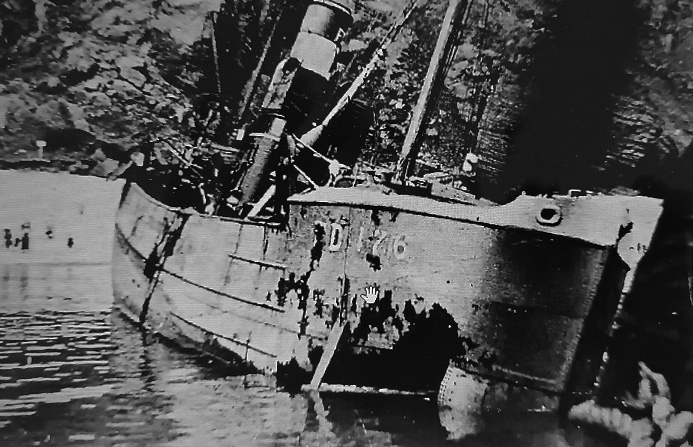
Kumu beached at Babbacombe after striking a naval mine off Torquay

In July 1914 Kumu was involved in a serious collision with TSS Duke of Argyll but survived and was repaired to return to service. On 5 September 1914, she was requisitioned by the Admiralty and converted for use as a minesweeper in the First World War. She was equipped with a 6-pounder deck gun. On 19 May 1917 she struck a German mine in Torbay laid by UC-17 which killed two crew members. She beached at Babbacombe and was repaired. On 12 March 1919, Kumu was returned to her owners and resumed her commercial fishing duties.

== Loss ==
In February 1929, Kumu was fishing near St Kilda with a crew of eleven. On the morning of 20 February at approximately 6:00 am she became enveloped in thick fog and ran aground off Soay, St Kilda. Her distress calls were received by Malin Head radio and also picked up by the Fleetwood trawler Harry Melling.

Kumu drifted into Glen Bay on Hirta but her crew were unable to get the anchor to hold. Harry Melling pulled alongside and was lashed to Kumu with pumps operated at full capacity, yet the water continued to rise. By 4:30 am on 21 February all crew were evacuated aboard Harry Melling and Kumu finally sank in 20 fathoms (120 ft; 37 m) of water.

== Wreck ==
The wreck of Kumu lies in Glen Bay at a depth of 43 metres (141 ft). The site was first surveyed by divers in 1998 during which they recovered a bell inscribed SS Manor Fleetwood 1913. The bell was being transported by Kumu as cargo destined for Norway. The bell was later donated to the National Trust for Scotland warden on St Kilda for display in the island’s museum. The wreck is largely broken up with the stern being the most intact part of the wreck.
