= Soay, St Kilda =

Islet in the St Kilda archipelago, Scotland

Soay
Soaigh (Gaelic)

Location
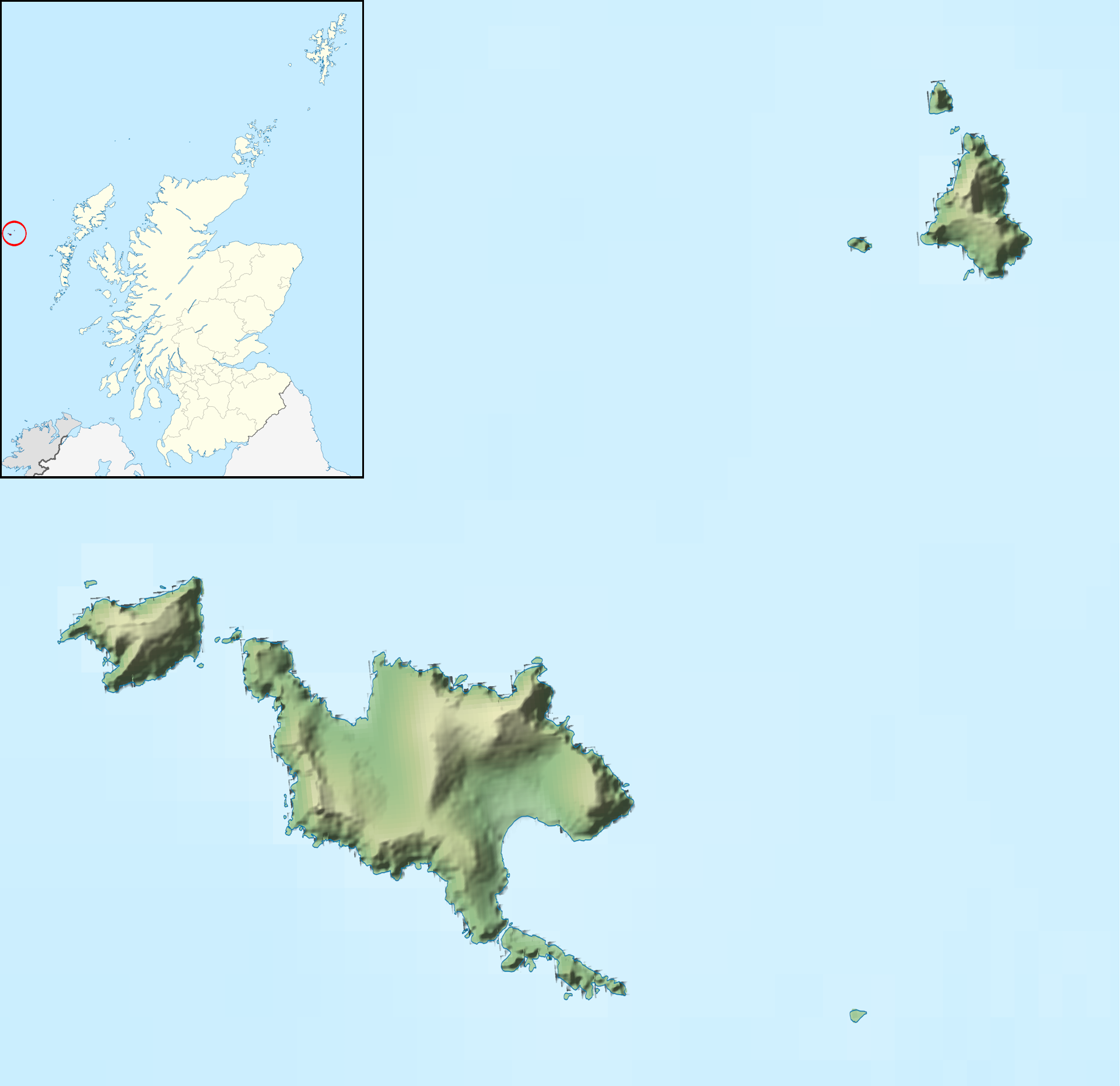
- Soay shown within St Kilda Soay shown within the Outer Hebrides
- OS grid reference: NA064014
- Coordinates: 57.83°N 8.63°W

Name
- Name meaning: island of sheep
- Old Norse name: Sauðey

Physical geography
- Island group: St Kilda
- Area: 99 ha (245 acres)
- Area rank: 150=
- Highest elevation: Cnoc Glas 378 m (1,240 ft)

Administration
- Council area: Outer Hebrides
- Country: Scotland
- Sovereign state: United Kingdom

Demographics
- Population: 0

Soay (Scottish Gaelic: Soaigh) is an uninhabited islet in the St Kilda archipelago, Scotland. The name is from Old Norse Sauðey, meaning "island of sheep". The island is part of the St Kilda World Heritage Site and home to a primitive breed of sheep. Excluding Rockall, it is the westernmost point of the United Kingdom.

== Geography ==
Soay lies some 40 miles (64 km) west-northwest of North Uist in the North Atlantic. It is about 2 kilometres (1.2 mi) north-west of Hirta, from which it is separated by the narrow Sound of Soay, which is only about 500 metres wide. Three sea stacks, Stac Shoaigh (Soay Stac), 61 metres (200 ft), Stac Biorach, 73 metres (240 ft) and Stac Dona, 27 meters (89ft), lie between. The island covers about 96.8 hectares (239 acres) and reaches a height of 378 metres (1,240 ft), the cliffs rising sheer from the sea. The summit, Cnoc Glas, is the most westerly hill in Great Britain and the United Kingdom.

The island is formed of a breccia of gabbro and dolerites and is a single mountain peak rising from the sea-bed, without Ice-Age erosion.

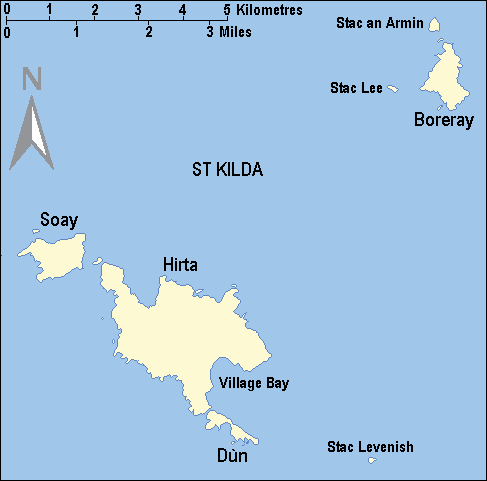
The St Kilda archipelago

Along with the rest of the archipelago, Soay is owned by the National Trust for Scotland, managed by NatureScot as a nature reserve and is included in the St Kilda World Heritage Site. It is unlikely that this island ever had permanent habitation. Men from Hirta would stay for a few days while gathering wool.

== Wildlife ==
Feral Soay sheep are a relict population of the first sheep brought to northern Europe around 5000BC. They were kept for their wool, which was plucked, not shorn, and made into tweed. Only occasionally were the sheep killed for meat. When the neighbouring island of Hirta became uninhabited, Soay sheep were introduced there too, and more recently they have become widely kept elsewhere as a livestock animal. Another somewhat less primitive breed, the Boreray, lives on another island in the group.

The island's cliffs hold breeding colonies of many seabirds, including gannet, fulmar, storm petrel, Manx shearwater, razorbill, great skua, Leach's petrel and puffin.

== Gallery ==
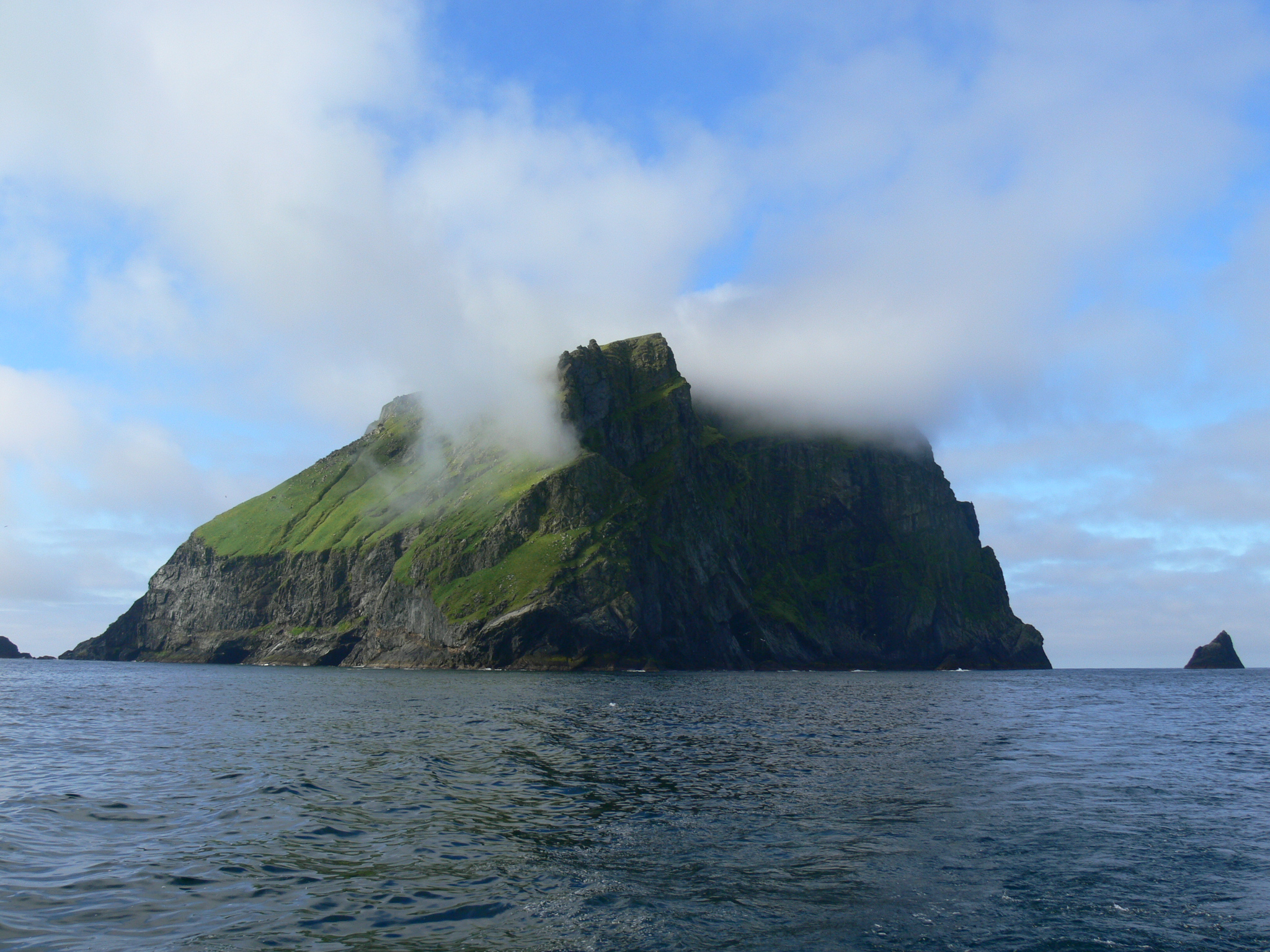
Soay in mist

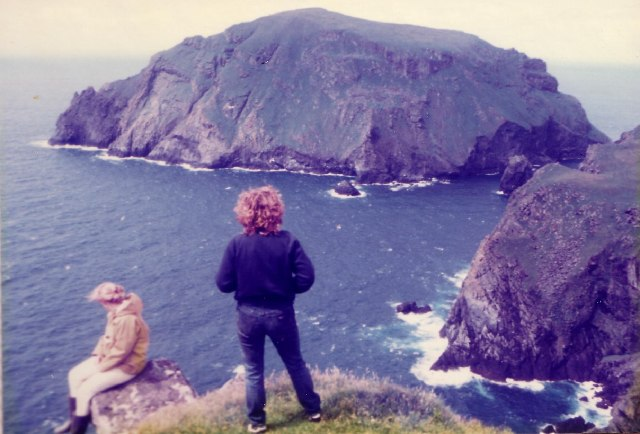
Soay from Hirta

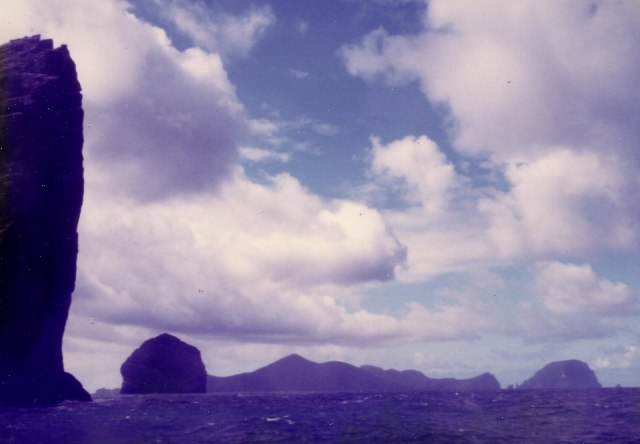
Soay and Hirta from Stac an Armin

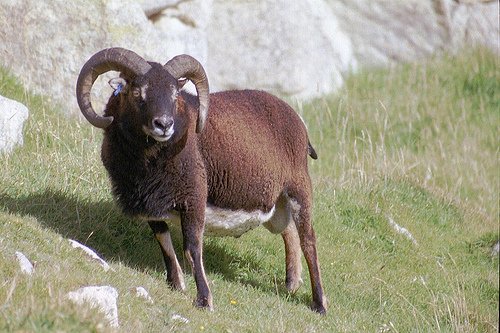
Soay sheep

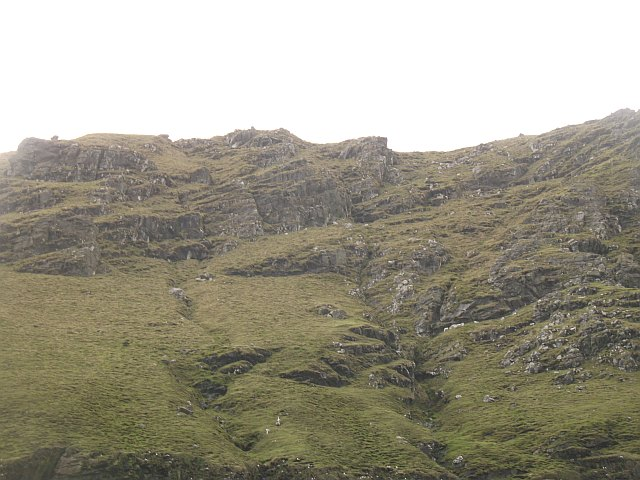
Steep pasture

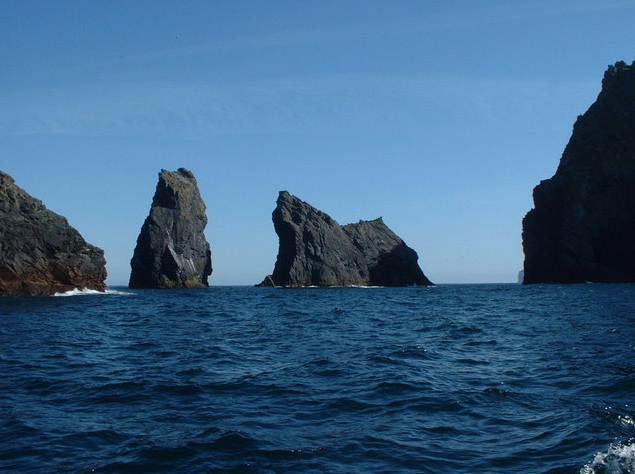
Sound of Soay

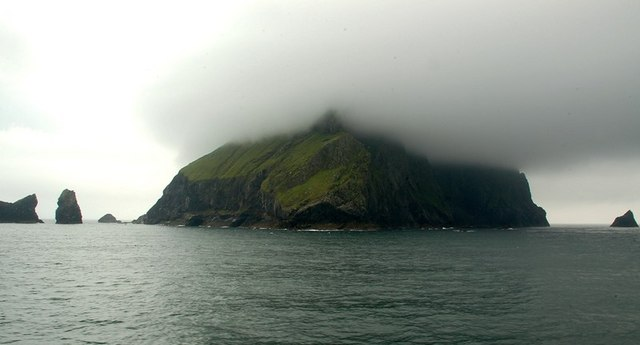
Soay in the mist

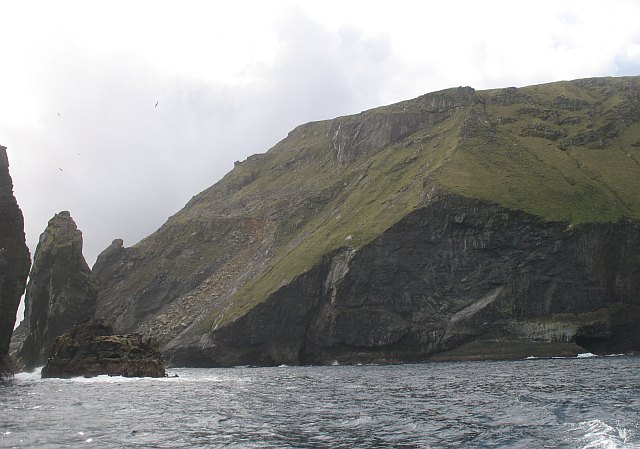
Freshly fallen scree

== See also ==
- List of islands of Scotland
- History of St Kilda
- List of outlying islands of Scotland
- Lítla Dímun, a similar island in the Faroes, formerly home to a similar breed of primitive sheep.
