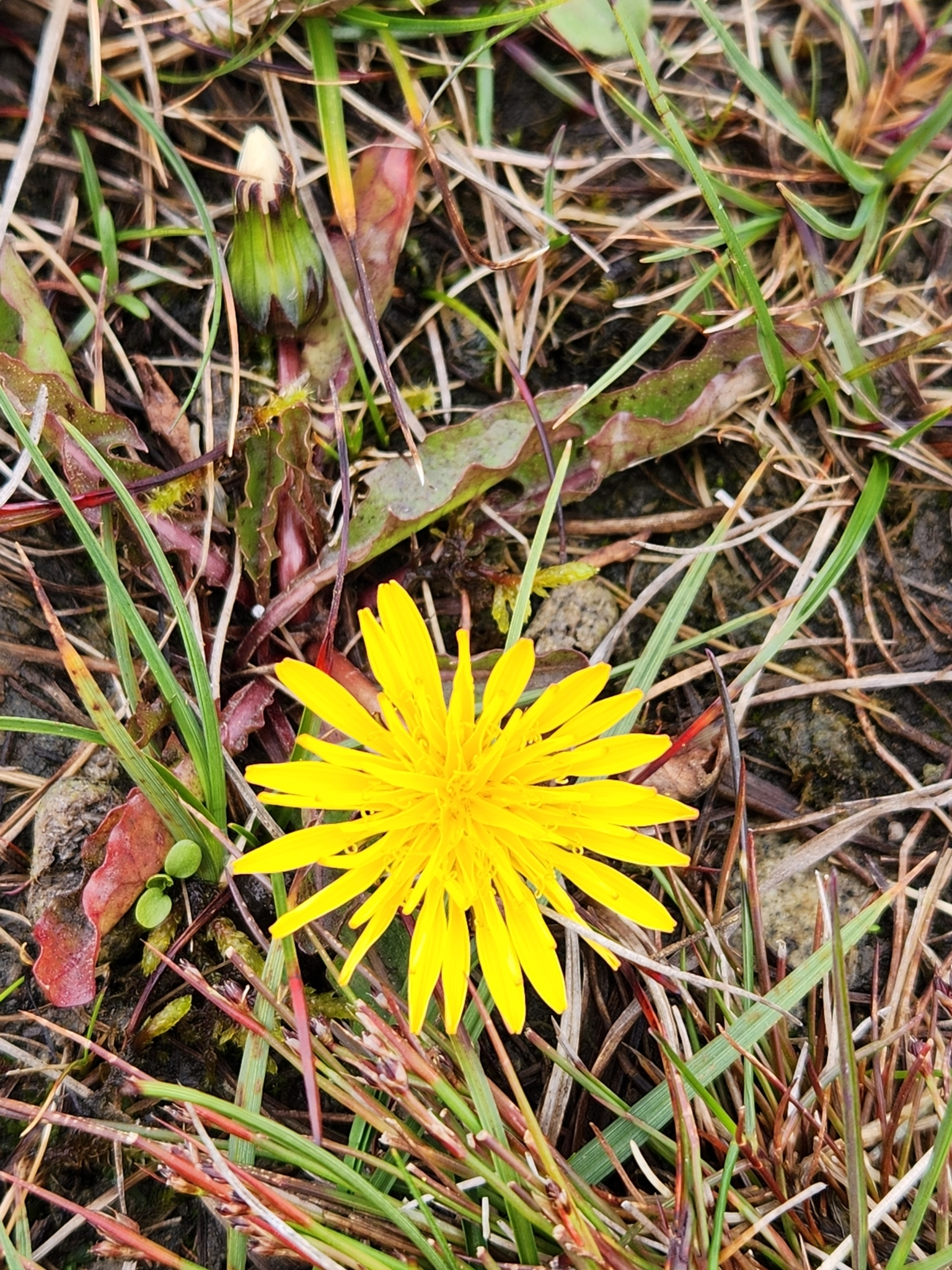

Scientific classification
- Kingdom: Plantae
- Clade: Tracheophytes
- Clade: Angiosperms
- Clade: Eudicots
- Clade: Asterids
- Order: Asterales
- Family: Asteraceae
- Genus: Taraxacum
- Species: T. pankhurstianum

Binomial name
- Taraxacum pankhurstianum A.J.Richards & Ferguson-Smyth (2012)

= Taraxacum pankhurstianum =

Species of flowering plant

Taraxacum pankhurstianum, also known as the St Kilda dandelion, is a species of dandelion that was identified as new in 2012 after being cultivated at the Royal Botanic Garden Edinburgh from seeds collected two years previously on the island of Hirta, the largest island in the St Kilda archipelago, on the western edge of Scotland.

== Taxonomy ==
Records of dandelions growing on St Kilda go back over 130 years. During an 1889 expedition to the island, Alexander H. Gibson collected a specimen of a dandelion he identified as Taraxacum officinale. A 1927 trip to the island by John Gladstone also recorded the presence of T. officinale. Charles Plowright Petch traveled to St Kilda in 1931 and recorded the presence of Taraxacum palustre, describing it as rare; the reported scarcity of dandelions may be because Petch made his trip in late July and August, outside of the short season for dandelions on St Kilda. All of these records of dandelions on St Kilda likely refer to misidentified specimens of Taraxacum pankhurstianum, and indeed re-examination of the "T. officinale" specimen collected by Gibson revealed that it morphologically resembled T. pankhurstianum.

The type specimens of T. pankhurstianum were collected on the Isle of Hirta in June 2010 during a botanical survey by James W. McIntosh. McIntosh was requested by Richard J. Pankhurst of the Royal Botanic Garden Edinburgh (RGBE) to collect the seeds of any Taraxacum dandelions he encountered. McIntosh collected seeds from four dandelions near Village Bay, which were propagated when he returned to RGBE. These propagated plants were then described as a novel species by C. C. Ferguson-Smyth and A. J. Richards in 2012. The species was named after Pankhurst, who has studied Taraxacum dandelions for over three decades. It is placed in the section Spectabilia within the genus Taraxacum based on its morphological and ecological characteristics.

The evolutionary history of T. pankhurstianum is unknown. It may be a native of St Kilda endemic to the archipelago or a recent immigrant from another island from where it has not yet been recorded. Dandelions are closely associated with human habitation and rarely colonise undisturbed habitats. The species has been recorded on St Kilda from the 1890s onwards and may have been brought to the island by birds or Vikings, most probably from Iceland.

== Description ==
Taraxacum pankhurstianum is a small to medium-sized herb with many leaves that lie along the ground or point upward. The leaves can grow to a length of 10 cm and width of 3 cm, but are typically smaller. They are leathery and have a rounded tip, with the end joining the stem being more pointed. The upper surface is rough, hairy, and dark bluish-green with brownish-purple splotches.The species can be distinguished from the more widespread T. faeroense by its hairy exterior bracts, more leathery and hairy leaves, rose-pink stripes on the ligules, and longer achenes.

== Distribution and habitat ==
The type specimens of the species were collected from an acidic grassland near Village Bay, at an elevation of 75 m. Other dandelions closely related to T. pankhurstianum are typically found in damp areas with acidic soil, growing in montane or submontane regions.

== Conservation ==
Taraxacum dandelions have been described as being rare on St Kilda. This may be due to several factors, including consumption of dandelions by fulmars and sheep and the fact that most botanists visiting the archipelago visit outside of the short dandelion season, which may peak in May.
