= Stac Shoaigh =

Sea Stack off St. Kilda, Scotland

Stac Shoaigh (Gaelic)
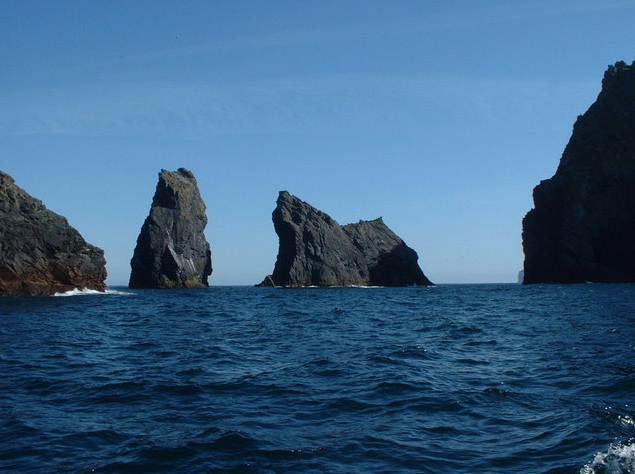
- Stac Biorach (at left) and Stac Shoaigh (at right)

Location
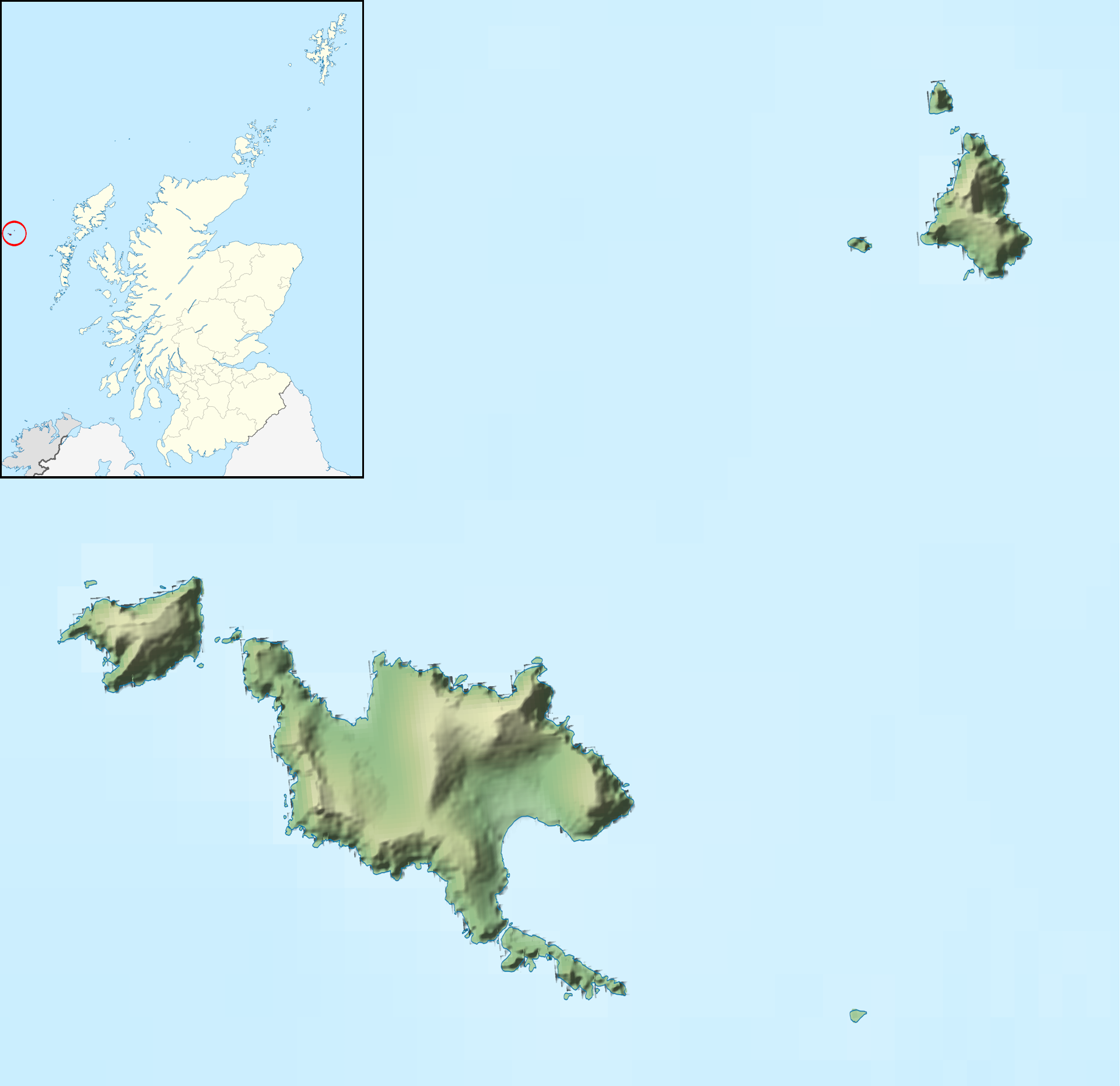
- Stac Shoaigh shown within St Kilda Stac Shoaigh shown within the Outer Hebrides
- OS grid reference: NA071013
- Coordinates: 57.829°N 8.622°W

Name
- Name meaning: "stack of Soay"

Physical geography
- Island group: St Kilda
- Highest elevation: 53 m (174 ft)

Administration
- Council area: Comhairle nan Eilean Siar
- Country: Scotland
- Sovereign state: United Kingdom

Demographics
- Population: 0

Stac Shoaigh (Scottish Gaelic: "stack of Soay") is a sea stack situated in the St Kilda Archipelago. It is positioned east of the taller Stac Biorach in the small channel separating Hirta and Soay. The stack and surrounding archipelago is a designated UNESCO World Heritage Site and is managed by the National Trust for Scotland.

== History ==
=== Formation ===
The St. Kilda Archipelago was formed around 60 million years ago. Its islands and stacks, including Stac Shoaigh, are the only surviving remnants of an extinct Palaeogenic volcano.

=== Use by St Kildans ===
The first written account of St. Kildans climbing sea stacks to harvest food came from Martin Martin, who visited the archipelago in 1698 and recorded his experience in the book A Late Voyage to St Kilda. He wrote:

"It is much of the form and height of a steeple; there is a very great dexterity, and it is reckoned no small gallantry to climb this rock, especially that part of it called the Thumb, which is so little, that of all the parts of a man's body, the thumb only can lay hold on it... and having a rope about his middle, that he casts down to the boat, by the help of which he carries up as many persons as are designed for fowling at this time; the foreman, or principal climber, has the reward of four fowls bestowed upon him above his proportion; and, perhaps, one might think four thousand too little to compensate so great a danger as this man incurs; he has this advantage by it, that he is recorded among their greatest heroes; as are all the foremen who lead the van in getting up this mischievous rock."

Stac Shoaigh can be seen from a boat trip to Village Bay on Hirta, the main landing destination for the islands.

== See also ==
- List of sea stacks in Scotland
- List of outlying islands of Scotland
