= History of St Kilda =

History of an archipelago in Scotland

St Kilda was continuously inhabited for two millennia or more, from the Bronze Age to the 20th century.

However, little is known of the early history, the first written record of which dates from the late 14th century when John of Fordun mentions 'the isle of Irte, which is agreed to be under the Circius and on the margins of the world'. The islands were historically part of the domain of the MacLeods of Harris whose steward was responsible for the collection of rents in kind and other duties. The first report of a visit to the islands dates from 1549 when Donald Munro suggested that:

The inhabitants thereof ar simple poor people, scarce learnit in aney religion, but M'Cloyd of Herray, his stewart, or he quhom he deputs in sic office, sailes anes in the zear ther at midsummer, with some chaplaine to baptise bairnes ther.

== Religion and tourism in the 18th and 19th centuries ==
Year	1758	1764	~1799	1841	1851	1852	1861	1911	1913	1927	1930
Population	88	90	just under 100	105	112	76	71	74	75 to 80	47	36

However, visiting ships in the 18th century brought cholera and smallpox and in 1727 the loss of life was so high that there were not enough men to man the boats and new families were brought in from Harris to replace them. By 1758 the population had risen to 88 and reached just under 100 by the end of the century. This figure remained fairly constant from the 18th century on until 1851 when 36 islanders emigrated to Australia on board the Priscilla, a loss from which the island never fully recovered.

One factor in the decline was the influence of religion. A missionary called Alexander Buchan came to St Kilda in 1705, but despite a lengthy stay there the idea of organised religion did not seem to take hold. This changed when Rev John MacDonald, the 'Apostle of the North' arrived in 1822. He set about his mission with zeal, preaching thirteen lengthy sermons during his first eleven days there. He returned regularly and fund-raised on behalf of the St Kildans, although privately he was appalled by their lack of religious knowledge. The islanders took to him with enthusiasm and wept when he left for the last time eight years later. His successor, who arrived on 3 July 1830 was Rev Neil Mackenzie, a resident Church of Scotland minister who greatly improved the conditions of the inhabitants. He re-organised island agriculture, was instrumental in the rebuilding of the village (see below) and supervised the building of a new church and manse. With help from the Gaelic School Society, MacKenzie and his wife introduced formal education to Hirta, beginning a daily school to teach reading, writing and arithmetic and a Sunday school for religious education.

Mackenzie left in 1844 and although he had clearly achieved a great deal, the weakness of the St Kildan's dependence on an external authority was exposed in 1865 with the arrival of Rev John Mackay, a minister in the new Free Church of Scotland. Mackay was a religious zealot who may have done more than any single individual to destroy the St Kildan way of life. He introduced a routine of three two- to three-hour services on Sunday at which attendance was effectively compulsory. One visitor noted in 1875 that:

The Sabbath was a day of intolerable gloom. At the clink of the bell the whole flock hurry to Church with sorrowful looks and eyes bent upon the ground. It is considered sinful to look to the right or to the left.

The excessive time spent in religious gatherings began to interfere seriously with the practical routines of running the island. Old ladies and children who made a noise in church were lectured at length and warned of the dire punishments they could expect in the afterworld. During a period of food shortages on the island a relief vessel arrived on a Saturday only to be informed by the minister that the islanders had to spend the day preparing for church on the Sabbath and it was Monday before any supplies were landed. Children were forbidden to play games and required to carry a bible wherever they went. The St Kildans endured Mackay for twenty four years.

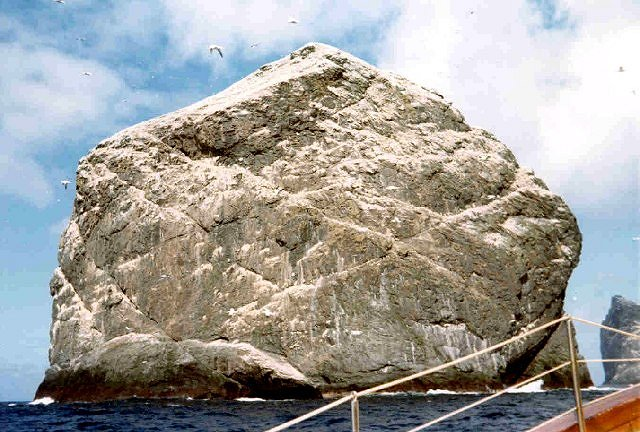
Stac Lee, St Kilda.

Tourism had a different but similarly de-stabilising impact on St Kilda. During the 19th century steamers began to visit Hirta, enabling the islanders to earn money from the sale of tweeds and bird's eggs but at the expense of their self-esteem as the tourists clearly regarded them as curiosities. The boats also brought other previously unknown diseases, especially tetanus infantum which resulted in infant mortality rates as high as 80% during the late 19th century. The cnatan na gall or boat-cough became a regular feature of life.

By the turn of the 20th century formal schooling had become a feature of the islands and in 1906 the church was extended to make a schoolhouse. The children all now learned English in addition to their native Gaelic. Improved midwifery skills, denied to the island by Reverend Mackay, reduced the problems of childhood tetanus. There had been some talk of an evacuation in 1875 during MacKay's period of tenure, but despite occasional food shortages and flu epidemic in 1913 the population was stable at between 75 and 80 and there was no obvious sign that within a few years the millennia old occupation of the island was to end.

== First World War ==
Early in the First World War the Royal Navy erected a signal station on Hirta and daily communications with the mainland were established for the first time in St Kilda's history. In a belated response, a German submarine arrived in Village Bay on the morning of 15 May 1918 and after issuing a warning, started shelling the island. Seventy-two shells in all were fired and the wireless station was destroyed. The manse, church and jetty storehouse were also damaged but there was no loss of life. One eye-witness recalled

It wasn't what you would call a bad submarine because it could have blowed every house down because they were all in a row there. He only wanted Admiralty property. One lamb was killed... all the cattle ran from one side of the island to the other when they heard the shots.

As a result of this attack a 4-inch Mark III QF gun was erected on a promontory overlooking Village Bay, but it was never fired in anger. Of greater long-term significance to the islanders was the introduction of regular contact with the outside world and the slow development of a money-based economy, both of which made life easier, but less self-reliant. These were both factors in the evacuation of the island only a little more than a decade later.

== Evacuation ==
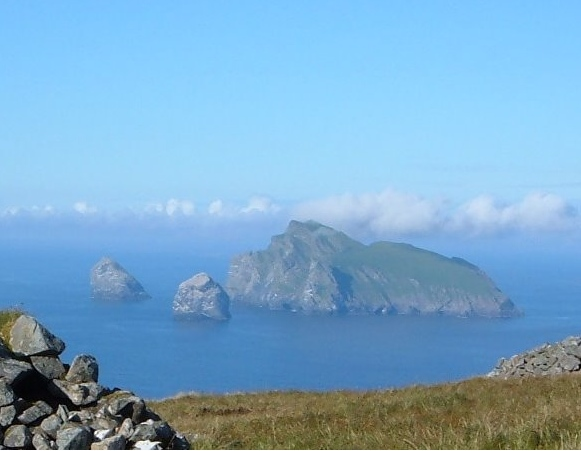
Boreray, Stac Lee, and Stac an Armin (left) from the heights of Conachair

There were thus numerous reasons for the evacuation. The islands had existed for centuries with only fleeting contacts with the rest of the world. The advent of tourism and the presence of the military in the First World War had enabled the islanders to understand that there were alternatives to the privations they had routinely suffered. Despite the provision of a small jetty in 1902 the islands remained at the mercy of the weather. The authorities were unable to do much to assist them, although reliable radios and other infrastructure denied to the civilian islanders were later to be provided for the military base at a cost of millions of pounds.

After the First World War most of the young men left the island and the population fell from 73 in 1920 to 37 in 1928. After the death of four men from influenza in 1926, and a succession of crop failures in the 1920s, the last straw came with the death from appendicitis of a young woman, Mary Gillies, in January 1930. On 29 August 1930, the last 36 inhabitants were evacuated to Morvern on the Scottish mainland at their own request.

The morning of the evacuation promised a perfect day. The sun rose out of a calm and sparkling sea and warmed the impressive cliffs of Oiseval....Observing tradition the islanders left an open Bible and a small pile of oats in each house, locked all the doors and at 7 a.m. boarded the Harebell... They were reported to have stayed cheerful throughout the operation. But as the long antler of Dun fell back onto the horizon and the familiar outline of the island grew faint, the severing of an ancient tie became a reality and the St Kildans gave way to tears.

The islands were purchased in 1931 by Lord Dumfries (later 5th Marquess of Bute), from Sir Reginald MacLeod and for the next twenty six years the island experienced quietude, save for the occasional summer visit from a returning St Kildan family.

== Later military events ==
The islands took no active part in the Second World War during which they were completely abandoned, but there are three aircraft crash sites from that period. A Beaufighter LX798 based at Port Ellen on Islay crashed into Conachair within 100 metres of the summit on the night of 3–4 June 1943. A year later, just before midnight on 7 June 1944, the day after D-Day, a Sunderland flying boat ML858 was wrecked at the head of Gleann Mor. There is a small plaque in the kirk dedicated to those who lost their lives in this accident. A Wellington bomber crashed on the south coast of Soay at some point in 1943. It was not until 1978 that any formal attempt was made to investigate the wreck, and its identity has not been absolutely determined. Amongst the wreckage a Royal Canadian Air Force cap badge was discovered, which suggests it may have been LA995 which lost during a flight on 28 September 1943.

In 1955 the UK Government decided to incorporate St Kilda into a missile-tracking range based in Benbecula, where test firings and flights are carried out. Thus in 1957 St Kilda became permanently inhabited once again. A variety of new military buildings and masts have since been erected, including the island's first licensed premises, the 'Puff Inn'. The Ministry of Defence leases St Kilda from the National Trust for Scotland for a nominal fee. The main island of Hirta is still occupied all year round by a small number of civilians working in the military base there.
