= Stac Biorach =

Rock formation in the Outer Hebrides, Scotland

Stac Biorach (Gaelic)
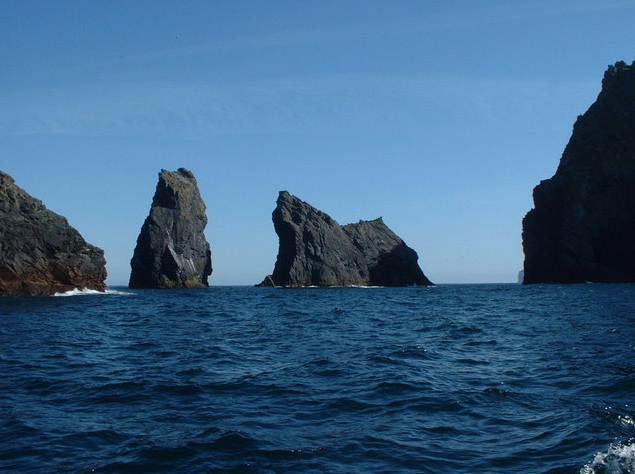
- Stac Biorach (at left) and Stac Soay

Location
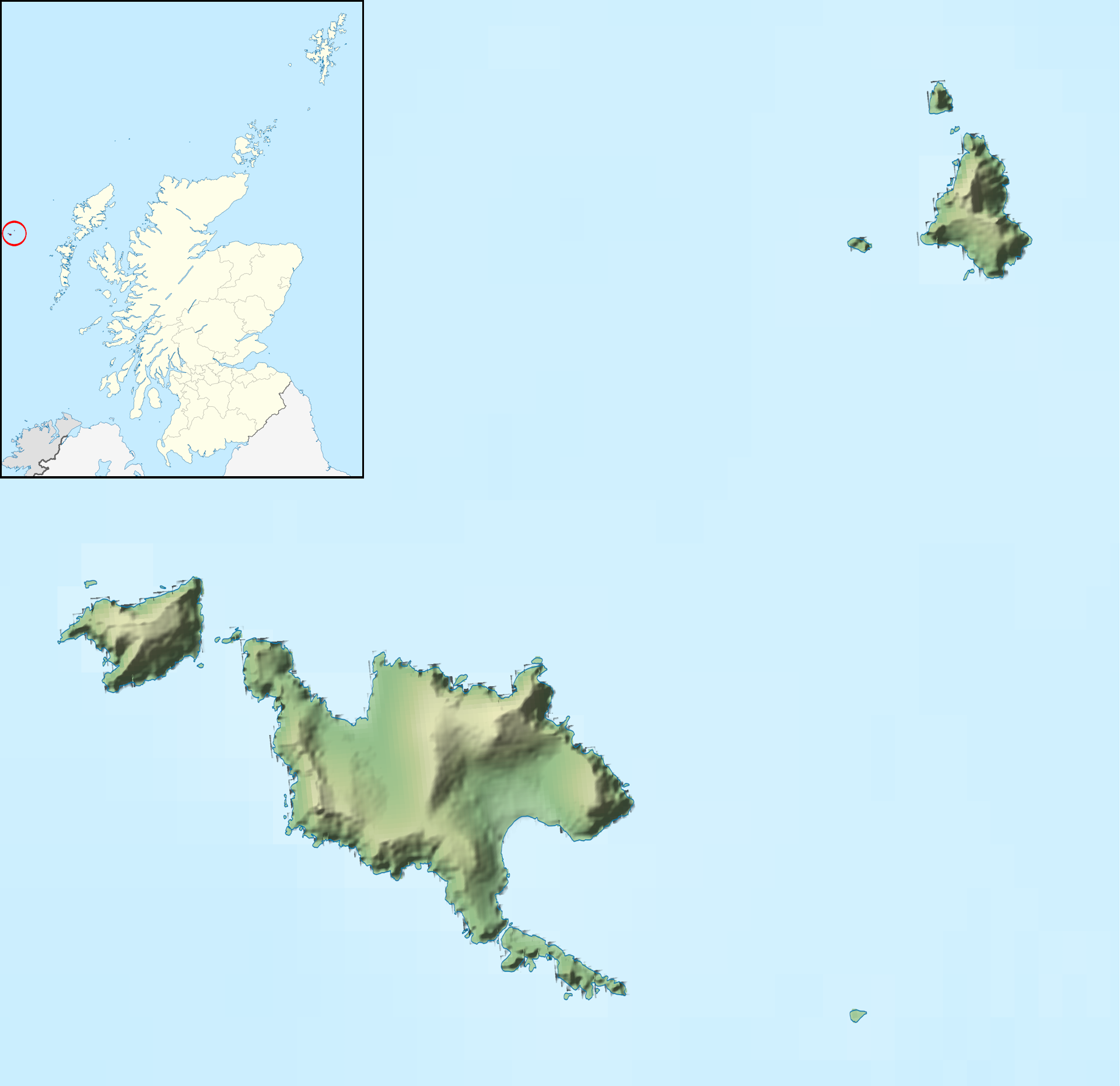
- Stac Biorach shown within St Kilda Stac Biorach shown within the Outer Hebrides
- OS grid reference: NA071013
- Coordinates: 57.829°N 8.622°W

Name
- Name meaning: "sharply pointed stack"

Physical geography
- Island group: St Kilda
- Highest elevation: 73 m (240 ft)

Administration
- Council area: Comhairle nan Eilean Siar
- Country: Scotland
- Sovereign state: United Kingdom

Demographics
- Population: 0

Stac Biorach (Scottish Gaelic: "sharply pointed stack") is a sea stack, 73 metres (240 ft) tall, situated in the Sound of Soay between the islands of Hirta and Soay in the St Kilda archipelago of Scotland. It lies west of the 62 metres (203 ft) high Stac Shoaigh. Regarded by the St Kildans as the most challenging of their stacks to climb, it was nonetheless an important source of food. The first written records date from the second half of the 17th century and the first recreational ascent took place in 1883. It is now part of the St Kilda World Heritage Site and in the care of the National Trust for Scotland.

== History ==
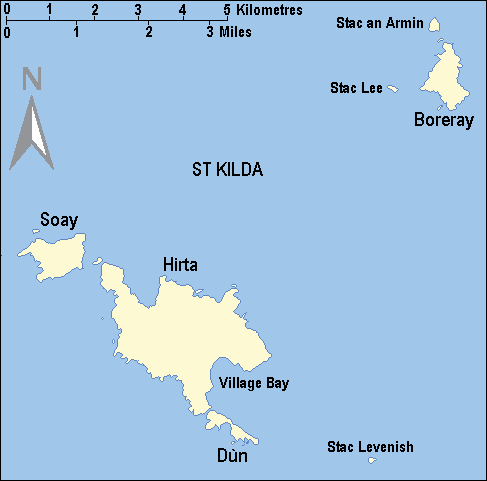
The St Kilda archipelago

The stack has never been inhabited, but has contributed considerably to the local economy by supplying the St Kildans with sea birds and their eggs. In the 19th century the St Kildans were observed collecting eggs from here in baskets like flat-bottomed bee hives, each of 17 baskets holding about 400 guillemot eggs.

Also known as "Thumb Stack" because the only holds on the rock are no bigger than a thumb, it was "regarded as the most difficult and dangerous to climb" and "one which only a few of the natives could lead." Quine (2000) describes the stack as "almost inaccessible" and adds that "even the St Kildans stopped climbing it around 1840". (Note: However, this cannot be entirely true given their assistance to Barrington in 1883.) (Note: The National Trust for Scotland indicate that such was the remoteness of St Kilda from mainland Scotland that Stac Biorach's exact location "remained a mystery" until Barrington's ascent in the late 19th century. However, Martin Martin's description, published in 1703 begins "Betwixt the west point of St. Kilda, and the Isle Soa, is the famous rock Stack-donn".)

=== Sir Robert Murray ===
Sir Robert Moray visited St Kilda in the latter half of the 17th century, (Note: Haswell-Smith gives the date as 1698. Taylor lists the relevant work - A Description of the island of Hirta as having been published in 1687 but this would also appear to be a typo - the original appearing in 1678. This must have been published posthumously - the Royal Society lists the original record as 30 September 1661.) and wrote a description of stack climbing in St Kilda: "after they landed, a man having room for but one of his feet, he must climb up 12 or 16 fathoms high. Then he comes to a place where having but room for his left foot and left hand, he must leap from thence to another place before him, which if hit right the rest of the ascent is easy... but if he misseth that footstep (as often times they do) he falls into the sea and the (boat's) company takes him in and he sits still until he is a little refreshed and then he tries it again, for everyone there is not able for that sport."

=== Martin Martin ===
Martin Martin visited St Kilda in 1697. He wrote of Stack-donn (Note: In the original 1678 publication Moray refers to Stacka Donna. However the description states that the stack concerned has an "abundance of fowls" which does not seem to fit the much smaller feature with the modern name of Stac Dona. Scottish Gaelic: dona means "bad" and the St Kildans gave this name to the stack because it provided few nesting spaces for birds. Haswell-Smith maintains that the stack referred to by Moray was Biorach. Similarly, Martin Martin's description refers to "Stack-donn" but is evidently about Stac Biorach. For example, the currently named Stac Dona is somehere between 15m and 27m high and shaped more like a pyramid than a steeple. Heathcote takes it for granted that Martin's Stack-donn is Stac Biorach.)that:

It is much of the form and height of a steeple; there is a very great dexterity, and it is reckoned no small gallantry to climb this rock, especially that part of it called the Thumb, which is so little, that of all the parts of a man’s body, the thumb only can lay hold on it... and having a rope about his middle, that he casts down to the boat, by the help of which he carries up as many persons as are designed for fowling at this time; the foreman, or principal climber, has the reward of four fowls bestowed upon him above his proportion; and, perhaps, one might think four thousand too little to compensate so great a danger as this man incurs; he has this advantage by it, that he is recorded among their greatest heroes; as are all the foremen who lead the van in getting up this mischievous rock.

Young St Kildan's were tested for their climbing skills on the stack and at one time any man who was unable to climb it was forbidden to take a wife, although this "law" was relaxed latterly.

Before any climbing could begin a landing had to be made. This was almost the trickiest part of any expedition to those stacs like Lee, Armin or Biorach, which to the inexperienced eye seem to rise sheer from the water, smooth and unapproachable as pencil leads. The expedition was usually led by the officer... [or] Gingach. He had to land first and leave last. The difficulty of landing, of getting a foot or hand hold on the slippery rock, was aggravated by the action of the waves (even in the calmest weather there is always a heavy swell), which carried the boat up and down the face of the rock, while it required all the skill of the boatmen to bring her close without striking. The officer had to wait for a wave to carry the boat up to a good height, then jump for it.

The dangers were considerable and Moray wrote that "The Men seldom grow old; and seldom was it ever known, that any man died in his Bed there, but was either drowned or broke his neck".

== Recreational climbing ==
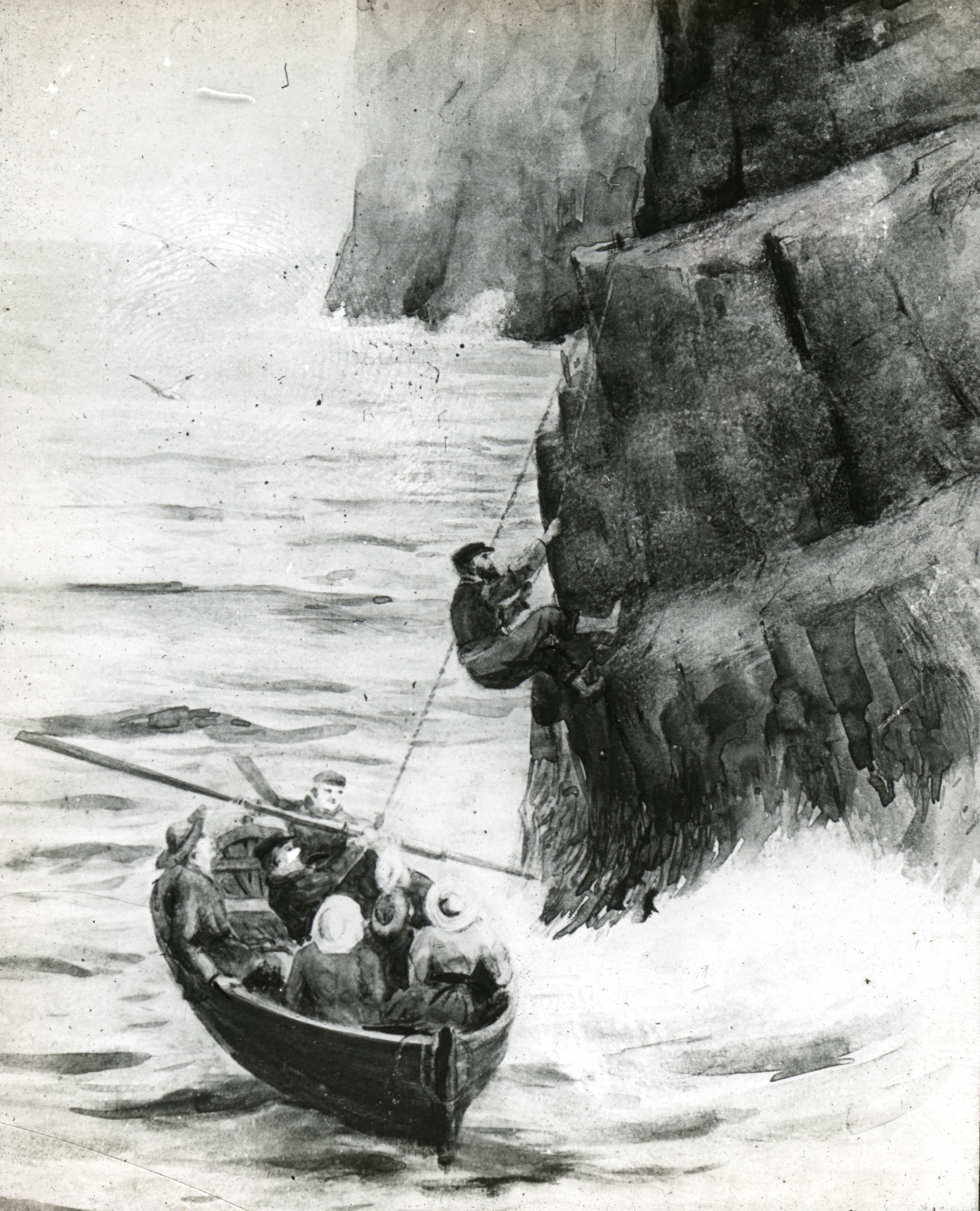
"Landing place on Stac Lii", illustration from Climbing in St Kilda by Norman Heathcote

The first record of the recreational ascent of a sea stack in Scotland is likely that of Richard Barrington, who climbed Stac Biorach in 1883. An experienced alpinist, he called it the most dangerous climb he had ever undertaken. (Note: This ascent of Stac Biorach is the subject of a number of conflicting assertions. Mellor has this FA taking place in 1883 by "a C. Barrington". Similarly, Haswell-Smith states that "The first recorded outsider to climb both this stack and Stac Lee was Charles Barrington in 1883". This refers to Richard's brother Charles who would have been 49 years old in 1883. Quine also states that the FA was in that year but by Richard Barrington. The National Trust for Scotland have R. Barrington as the climber but the date as 1890, a date repeated by the BBC. Maclean has Richard Barrington making the ascent in 1929. There is thus confusion about both the date of the ascent and which brother was the ascender. However, R. Barrington was 16 years younger than Charles and the Dictionary of Irish Biography makes it clear that it was the former who travelled to "remote islands off Scotland (1883, 1886, 1890)". The original paper by R. Barrington in the Alpine Journal in 1913 also states that the year of the ascent was 1883. Barrington wrote “the fact that a certain rivalry existed between myself and an elder brother who first ascended the Eiger induced me to visit St. Kilda in 1883, as I wished to test the ability of the natives as cragsmen, to compare them with Swiss guides, and to study the fauna and flora of this remote island, of which little was then known. It is thirty years ago next June since I ascended Stack-na-Biorrach, and therefore I trust I shall not be accused of hasty self-advertisement”.) He made the ascent with the help of two St Kildans, Donald McDonald and Donald McQueen.

Today climbing in all of the St Kilda archipelago is subject to the permission of the National Trust for Scotland, which rarely grants it. In 2023 a small group of British climbers, including Robbie Phillips from Edinburgh, completed the climb of Stac Biorach, the first documented ascent in over 130 years. Phillips said it "was like walking in the footsteps, or climbing in the fingerprints, of the St Kildans. It’s a testament to their bravery and mental fortitude; to climb onto that sea stack 70m above the raging Atlantic without even shoes is wild to imagine".

Haswell-Smith states that landing is only possible on three days in a summer month on average and that sailing the narrow channel between Stac Soay and Hirta is "possible in good weather". There are no anchorages in the vicinity save for Village Bay on Hirta.

== Birdlife and conservation status ==
Like the other stacks and islands of St Kilda, Stac Biorach is extraordinarily rich in birdlife, and boasts the largest colony of guillemots in the archipelago.

Today the whole of the St Kilda archipelago is a National nature reserve and bird life is protected. In the past however, these birds and their eggs were a crucial resource for the St Kildans. A 19th century eye-witness wrote of the guillemot eggs that they: "are very good eating when fresh. After they are incubated for a few days most of the egg appears, when boiled, to be changed into a rich thick cream, and in this condition they are also relished. Sometimes eggs, not only of this species but of some others which have not been hatched, are found late in the season. Some of these when cooked look like a piece of sponge-cake, have a high gamey flavour, and are esteemed a great delicacy."

St Kilda has been uninhabited since 1930 and in 1986 became a UNESCO World Heritage Site. Nearly one million seabirds are present on the islands during the breeding season making the archipelago "a seabird sanctuary without parallel in Europe".

== See also ==
- List of sea stacks in Scotland
- List of outlying islands of Scotland

== Notes ==
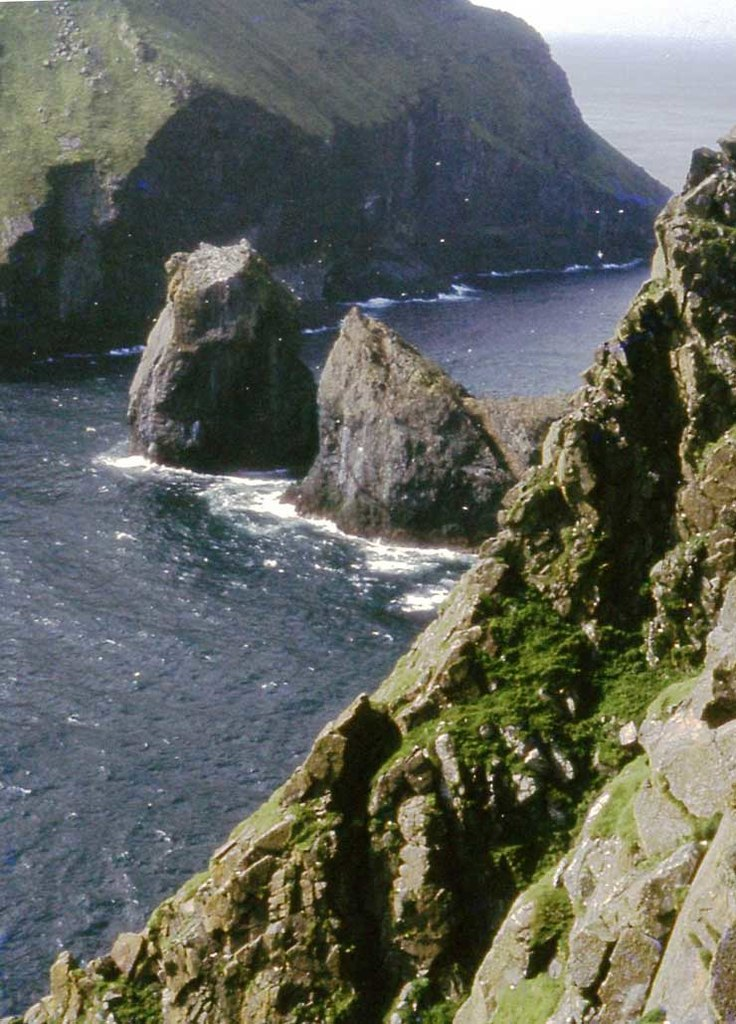
Stac Biorach from Hirta
