= Hirta =

Main island of the St Kilda archipelago, Scotland

Hiort (Gaelic)

Location
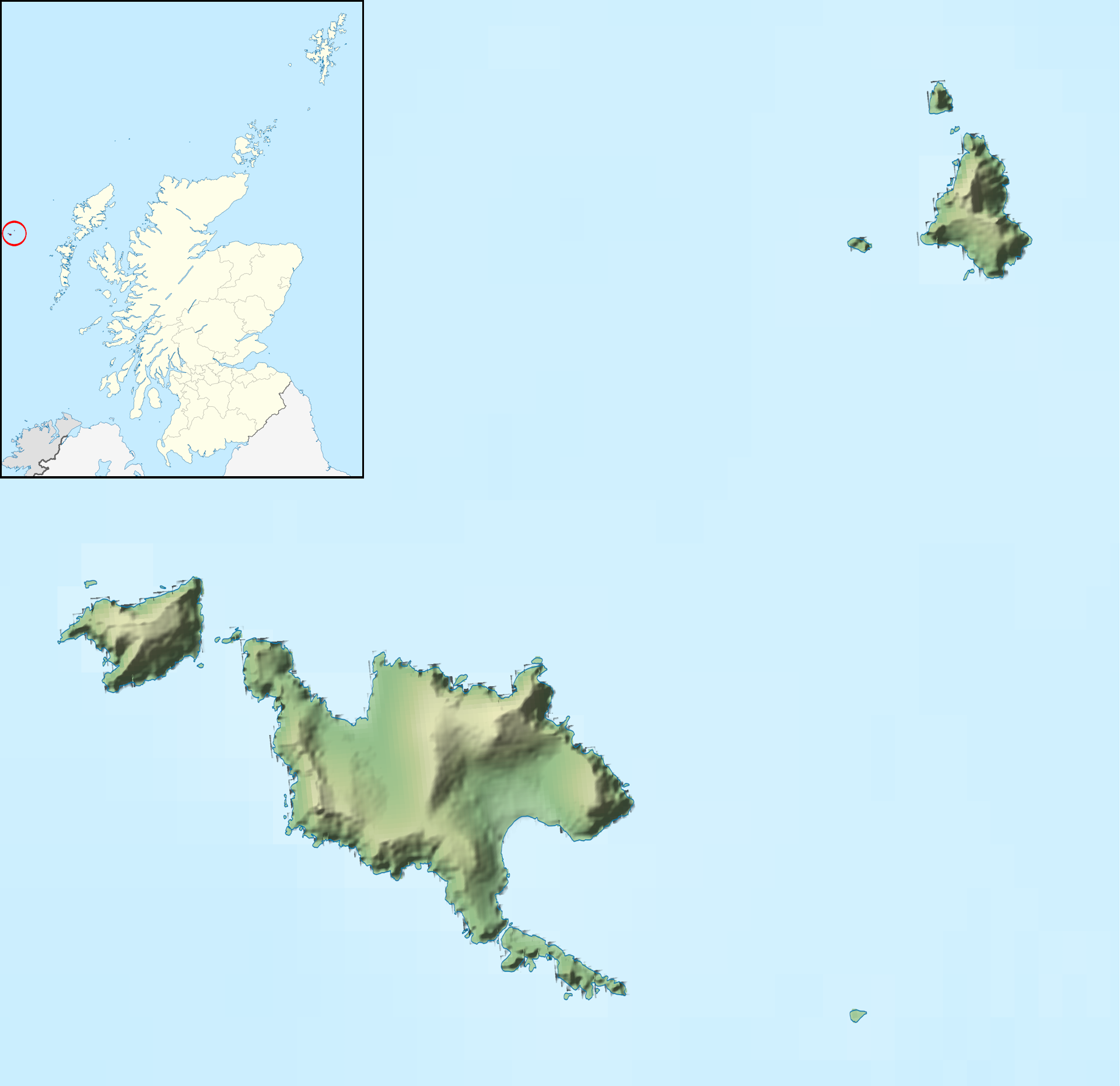
- Hirta, in the St Kilda archipelago of Scotland Hirta (Outer Hebrides)
- OS grid reference: NF092998
- Coordinates: 57.81°N 8.58°W

Name
- Name meaning: Uncertain
- Old Norse name: Skildar

Physical geography
- Island group: St Kilda
- Area: 628.5 ha (1,553 acres)
- Area rank: 65
- Highest elevation: 430 m (1,410 ft)

Administration
- Council area: Na h-Eileanan Siar
- Country: Scotland
- Sovereign state: United Kingdom

Demographics
- Population: abandoned in 1930

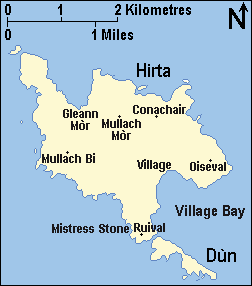
Map of Hirta

Hirta (Scottish Gaelic: Hiort) is the largest island in the St Kilda archipelago, on the western edge of Scotland. The names Hiort (in Scottish Gaelic) and Hirta (historically in English) have also been applied to the entire archipelago. Now without a permanent resident population, the island had nearly all of St Kilda's population of about 180 residents in the late 17th century and 112 in 1851. It was abandoned in 1930 when the last 36 remaining inhabitants were evacuated to Lochaline on the mainland.

The National Trust for Scotland owns the entire archipelago. It became one of Scotland's six World Heritage Sites in 1986 and is one of the few in the world to hold mixed status for both its natural and cultural qualities. Visits to the island are encouraged during months when the few facilities for tourists are open.

== Geography ==
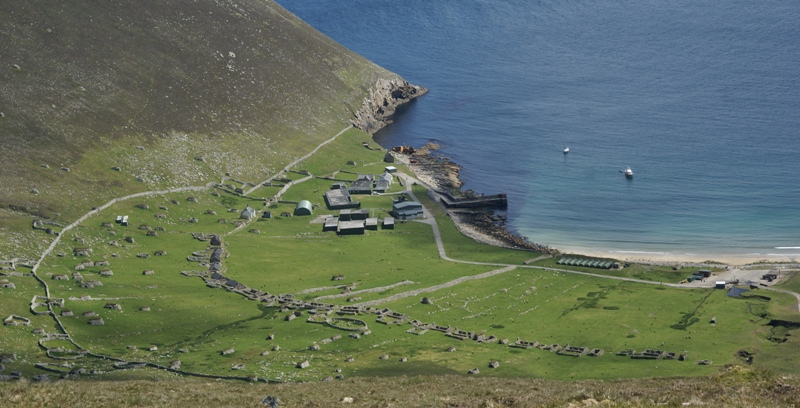
Overview of Village Bay

The island measures 3.4 kilometres (2 1/8 miles) from east to west, and 3.3 km (2 1/16 mi) from north to south. It has an area of 6.285 km^{2} (2 7/16 sq mi) and about 15 km (9 mi) of coastline. The only real landing place is in the shelter of Village Bay/Loch Hiort on the southeast side of the island. The island slopes gently down to the sea at Glen Bay (at the western end of the north coast), but the rocks go straight into the sea at a shallow angle and landing here is not easy if there is any swell at all. Apart from these two places, the cliffs rise sheer out of deep water. However, sea kayakers can also land for a break on a small boulder beach backed by cliffs in the north of the island, just before the northeast side where the highest summit in the island, Conachair, forms a precipice 430 m high (1,410 ft). St Kilda is probably the core of a Tertiary volcano, but, besides volcanic rocks, it contains hills of sandstone in which the stratification is distinct.

Dùn is separated from Hirta by a shallow strait by (Caolas an Dùin) which is about 50 metres (55 yards) wide; the strait is normally impassable and is reputed to dry out on rare occasions.

== Surrounding stacks ==
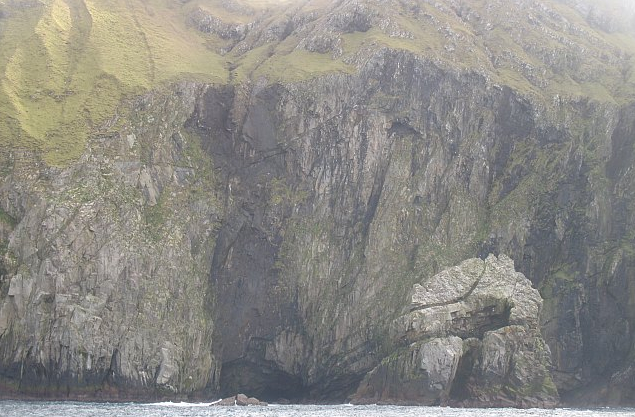
Bradastac

Hirta is surrounded by a number of small stacks. Bradastac, Mina Stac and Sgeir Domhnuill lie under the cliffs of Conachair to the east and Sgeir nan Sgarbh further south under the heights of Osieval. An Torc is west of Ruabhal and Sgeir Mhòr is further north under Mullach Bi.

There are also various large stacks in the narrow strait between Hirta and Soay: Stac Dona, Stac Soay and Stac Biorach.

== Etymology ==
The origin of Hirta is open to interpretation. Martin (1703) states that "Hirta is taken from the Irish Ier, which in that language signifies west". Maclean offers several options, including an unspecified Celtic word meaning "gloom" or "death", later suggested to be Ei hirt – dangerous or deathlike, or the Scots Gaelic hIar-Tìr ("westland"). Drawing on an Icelandic saga describing an early 13th-century voyage to Ireland that mentions a visit to the islands of "Hirtir", he speculates that the shape of Hirta resembles a stag, (hirtir meaning "stags" in Norse). Steel (1998) quotes the view of Reverend Neil Mackenzie, who lived there from 1829 to 1844, that the name is derived from the Gaelic Ì Àrd ("high island"), and a further possibility that it is from the Norse hirt ("shepherd"). In a similar vein, Murray (1966) speculates that the Norse Hirðö ("herd island", /hirðø/, HIRR-dhur), may be the origin.

== History and lifestyle ==
The St Kilda islands were continuously populated from prehistoric times. Archeologists working at the archipelago between 2017 and 2019 confirmed habitation as long as 2,000 years ago. Finds included Iron Age pottery and some potsherds that might be from Bronze Age pottery. The director of the project told BBC News that the work "revealed that the eastern end of Village Bay on St Kilda was occupied fairly intensively during the Iron Age period, although no house structures were found".

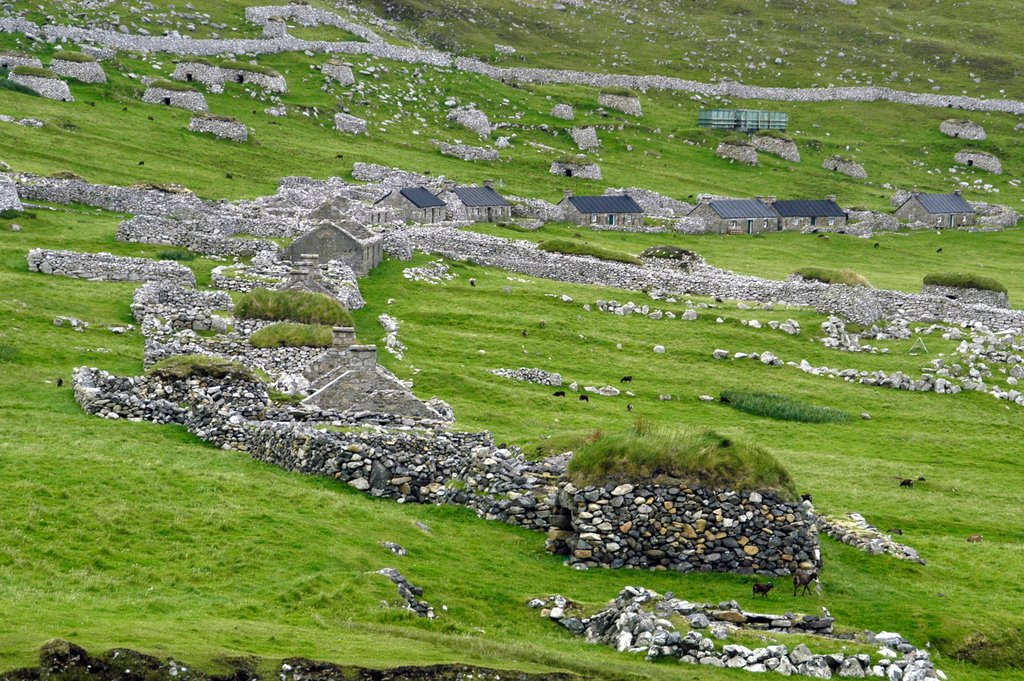
Abandoned homes on Hirta, built in the 1860s

In more recent history, Hirta was inhabited until 29 August 1930, when the 36 inhabitants were removed to the Scottish mainland at their own request.

St Kilda was part of the Lordship of the Isles, then a property of the MacLeods of Dunvegan from 1498 until 1930. There were three chapels on St Kilda, dedicated to Saint Brendan, Saint Columba, and Christ Church, but little remains. There are also the remains of a beehive house, known as the Amazon's House.

According to UNESCO, "St Kilda represents subsistence economies everywhere – living off the resources of land and sea and changing them over time, until external pressures led to decline". Indeed, the islanders had a tough life, and survived by exploiting the thousands of sea birds living on the islands. An 1885 report by a surgeon who visited Hirta reported that the inhabitants had no fruit or vegetables, except for a few potatoes of poor quality. They ate "oatmeal, salted fowl, and seabird eggs during summer and salted mutton in winter. They obtained tea, sugar, flour and tobacco from tourists and from the owner's factor". Water was obtained from freshwater springs.

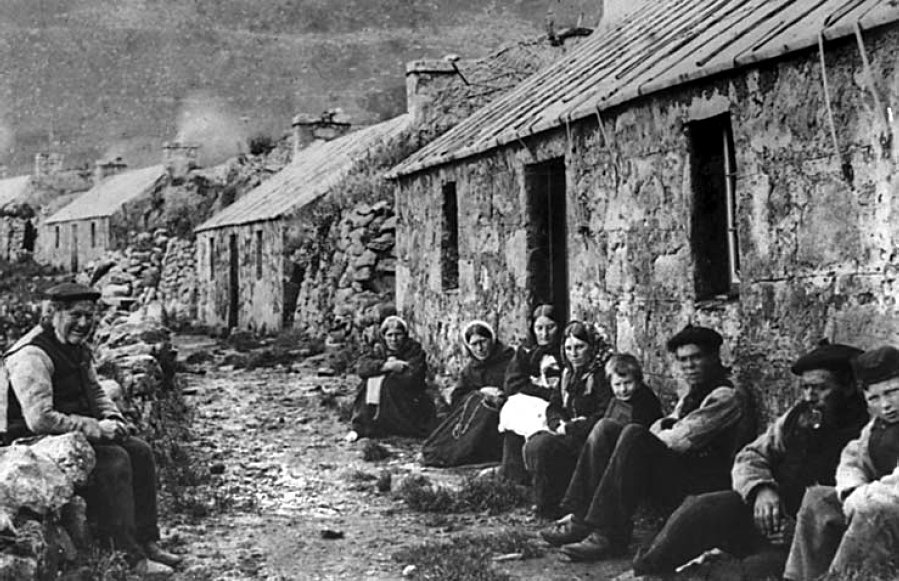
The Street, Village Bay (St Kilda Village), 1886

A history of Village Bay/Loch Hiort on Hirta states that some improvements in housing were made in the 1830s by the "landlord and the Rev. Neil MacKenzie". The report adds that "the old village further up the hill was replaced by a crescent of blackhouses ... Those were damaged by a hurricane, and in 1861, 16 new dwellings replaced the blackhouses which were relegated to byres".

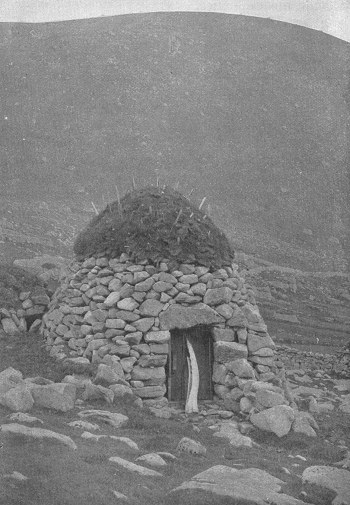
A cleit, used for storing and drying food; 1898 photo

Missionaries provided education for many years but by 1872, the state took over; a true school building was eventually built.

A diary (now owned by the NTS) written by a school teacher who worked in Village Bay shed some light on life here in the early 1900s. One source offers this perspective about the island in that era:

"relatively speaking, a vibrant, well-connected and economically successful place thanks to a booming tourist trade and a buoyant market for the island’s tweed. Whaling boats brought supplies of coal and the government was able to provide more services for the islanders – visiting doctors had spent the two weeks ... vaccinating its residents – and the frequent presence of English fishing fleets meant they were better linked to the wider world than ever before".

Medical care was always limited. In the late 1890s, there was a single nurse stationed on the island, with limited medical supplies. That level continued until the contingent was increased in 1915.

In 1908, British Pathé News released a documentary film, The Island Of St. Kilda, which shed light on the lifestyle in Hirta during that era. The film is available for viewing on several websites.

A documentary film which included scenes and people in Hirta filmed primarily in 1923, was released in 1928. The summary for St Kilda, Britain's Loneliest Isle, states: "A voyage from Glasgow to St Kilda, containing scenes of the Western Isles and island life of the crofters on St Kilda". The film is available for viewing on a National Library of Scotland Web page which also includes a great deal of specifics in the text, in a "Shotlist".

=== Declining population ===
Year	1758	1764	~1799	1841	1851	1852	1861	1911	1913	1927	1930
Population	88	90	just under 100	105	112	76	71	74	75 to 80	47	36

In 1764 (according to the Census), there were 90 St Kildans, 105 in 1841, and 112 in 1851. The following year, 36 left for Australia, financed by the Highland and Island Emigration Society. By the 1861 census, the population was only 71; by 1911 it was 74, and 43 by 1927, declining to 36 by 1930.

=== First World War ===
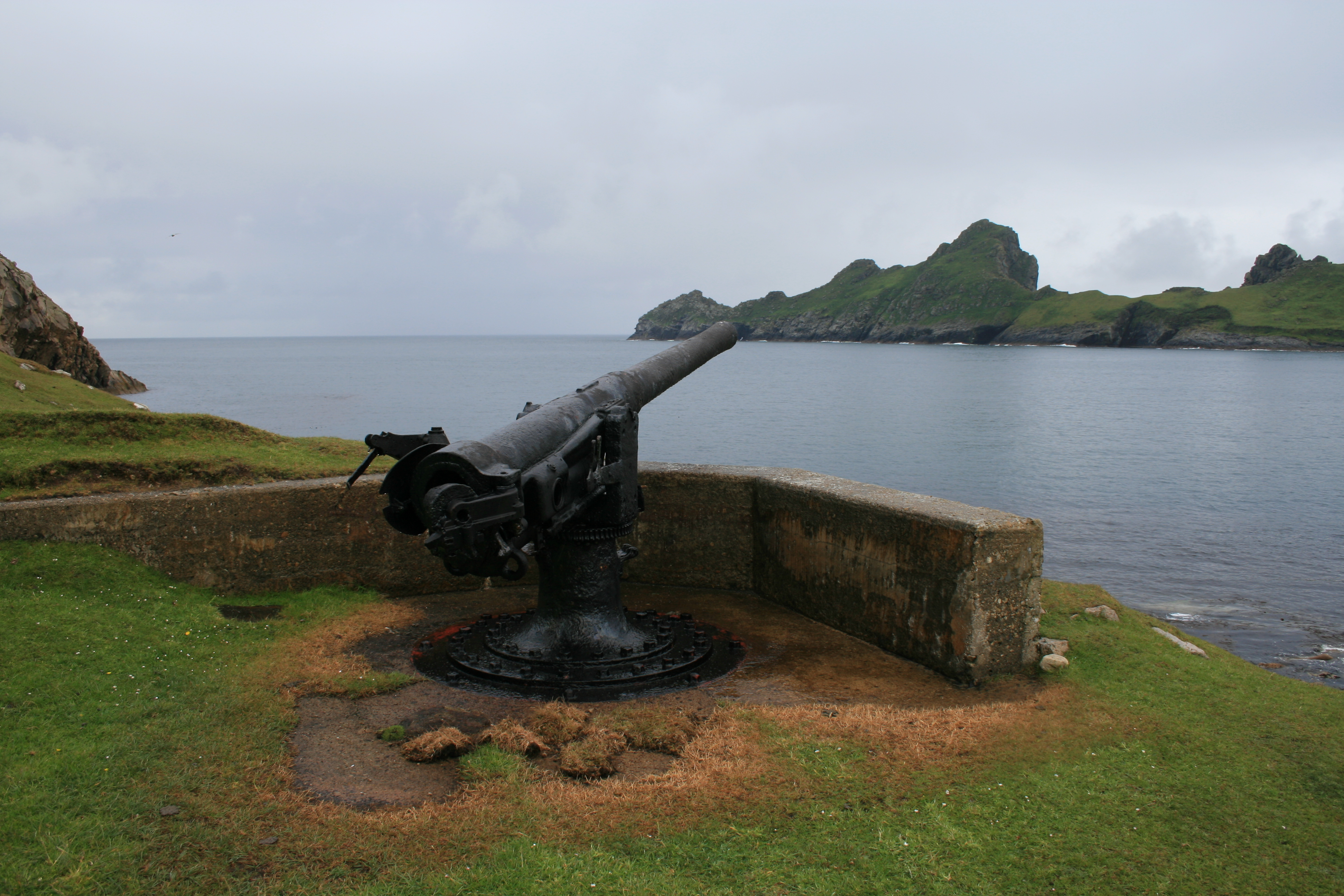
The 4-inch QF gun on Hirta looking towards Dùn

Early in the First World War, the Royal Navy erected a signal station on Hirta, and the first daily communications with the mainland were established. In a belated response, the German submarine SM U-90 arrived in Village Bay/Loch Hiort on the morning of 15 May 1918 and, after issuing a warning, started shelling the island. One report states that "the wireless station was destroyed. The manse, church & jetty storehouse were damaged, but no loss of life occurred".

Another source offers this perspective about the significance of WW I: "Ironically, things improved with the war, which brought a naval detachment and regular deliveries of mail and food from naval supply vessels. But when these services were withdrawn at end of the war, the sense of isolation increased. Able bodied young islanders left for a better life, resulting in a breakdown of the island economy".

=== Wreck of the Kumu ===
On 20 February 1929 the Aberdeen-built steam trawler SS Kumu ran aground in thick fog off Soay. The vessel eventually foundered in Glen Bay on the north side of Hirta. The shipwreck lies at a depth of 45 metres (148 ft) and was not surveyed by divers until 1998.

=== Evacuation and subsequent years ===
Before the evacuation in 1930, thirteen men, ten women, eight girls and five boys lived in St Kilda, all on Hirta. The 10 households rented cottages from the landowner, with the other six cottages being unoccupied. The evacuation was encouraged by Williamina Barclay, the resident Queen's Nurse, who was very concerned about health issues on Hirta, especially after the deaths of two young women. The islanders finally agreed and the majority signed a petition on 10 May 1930, stating that "it would be impossible to stay on the island another winter." The plan was supported by Dugald Munro, the missionary and schoolteacher, and by Nurse Barclay.

The evacuation was completed on 29 August 1930, using HMS Harebell which took them to Lochaline, in the Morvern peninsula. One report provided this summary:

The morning of the evacuation promised a perfect day. The sun rose out of a calm and sparkling sea and warmed the impassive cliffs of Oiseval. The sky was hopelessly blue and the sight of Hirta, green and pleasant as the island of so many careless dreams, made parting all the more difficult. Observing tradition the islanders left an open Bible and a small pile of oats in each house, locked all the doors and at 7am boarded the Harebell. Although exhausted by the strain and hard work of the last few days, they were reported to have stayed cheerful throughout the operation. But as the long antler of Dun fell back onto the horizon and the familiar outline of the island grew faint, the severing of an ancient tie became a reality and the St Kildans gave way to tears.

A film made by a private individual in summer 1930 includes some scenes of the "preparations and evacuation of the island". It is owned by the National Library of Scotland and available for viewing on their website.

According to the National Records of Scotland, "officials found forestry work for the men, and most of them were settled at Lochaline near Oban, while other families went to live at Strome Ferry, Ross-shire, Culcabock near Inverness, and at Culross, Fife".

As of 1930, St Kilda was owned by Sir Reginald MacLeod of MacLeod and sold to the Earl of Dumfries, later Marquess of Bute, in 1931. He bequeathed it National Trust for Scotland in 1957. St Kilda was designated as Scotland's first World Heritage Site in 1987. A few facilities for visitors are available on the island. The Ministry of Defence established a base on Hirta for tracking missiles fired from the station on South Uist.

=== Military use ===
In 1955, the British government decided to incorporate St Kilda into a missile tracking range based in Benbecula, where test firings and flights are carried out. A variety of military buildings and masts were erected, including a canteen (which is not open to the public), the Puff Inn. Some of the workers do live on the island throughout the year. The Ministry of Defence (MoD) leases St Kilda from the National Trust for Scotland for a nominal fee.

In summer 2018, the MOD facilities were being restored as part of building a new base; one report stated that the project included "replacing aged generators and accommodation blocks". With no permanent population, the island population can vary between 20 and 70. These inhabitants include: MoD employees, National Trust for Scotland employees, and several scientists working on a Soay sheep research project.

== Tourism ==
Visits by tourists in summer became quite common starting in the 1870s when steamships and private yachts began arriving. A new pier was built in 1901, making it easier to land passengers from the larger craft, using rowboats.

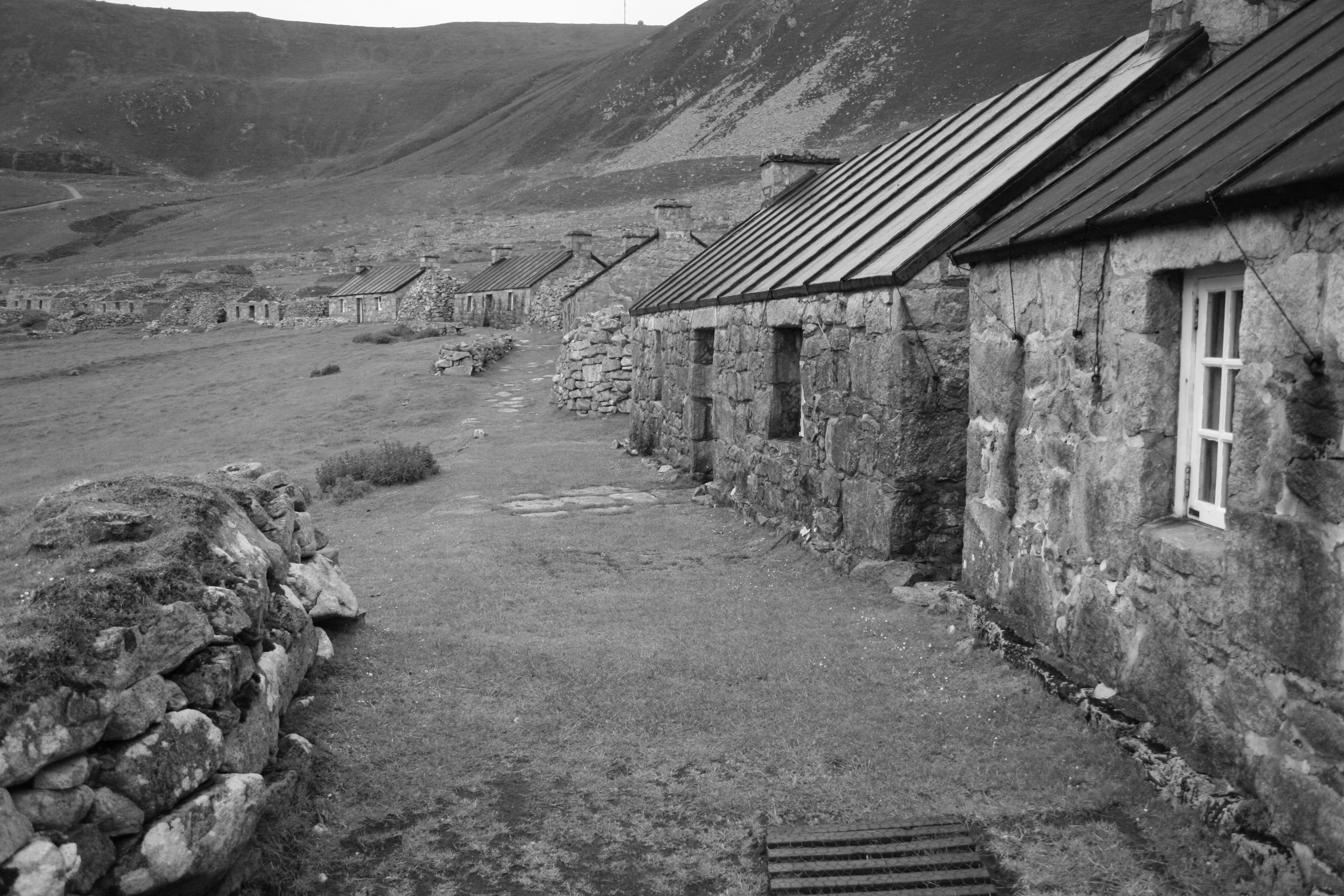
Abandoned Village Bay homes, Hirta, June 2007

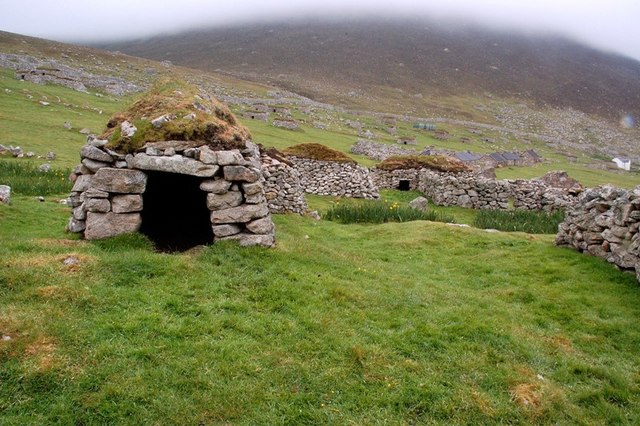
A cleit (storage shed); 2009

The remnants of the homes built in the early 1860s in Village Bay (also known as St Kilda Village) and the remnants of three old chapels, are readily visible. A tour operator's website states that when facilities in Hirta are open, "the St. Kilda museum, school and church provide a fascinating insight into the St Kildans’ way of life ... the remains of the village, the graveyard and Second World War gun" can also be viewed.

The Historic Environment Scotland Web site adds that "the plain, two-bay church, with the schoolroom added to its north west in 1898" was "restored as they might have appeared in the 1920s". The Web site also explains that the "arrangement of St Kilda Village along a curving street is the result of mid-19th century improvement ... Distinctive drystone storage structures, known as cleitan, are scattered throughout the landscape. There are over 1,400 cleitan known throughout the St Kilda archipelago, but they are concentrated in the area around the village". (A cleit is a small stone building with a thatched roof that was used for drying and storing food.)

The NTS has improved the Village over the years. "They have reroofed [some of] the cottages on the main street, restored the church, and restacked stones that years of gales had toppled from the cleits, or bothies, that dot the volcanic landscape", according to a November 2017 report. One cottage, #3 on "The Street", was more extensively restored and turned into the museum.

Tourist trips to the island are readily available from several tour operators by boat.

== See also ==
- List of islands of Scotland
- List of outlying islands of Scotland
- Taraxacum pankhurstianum, the St Kilda dandelion
