= Horn (anatomy) =

Animal anatomy of hornlike growths

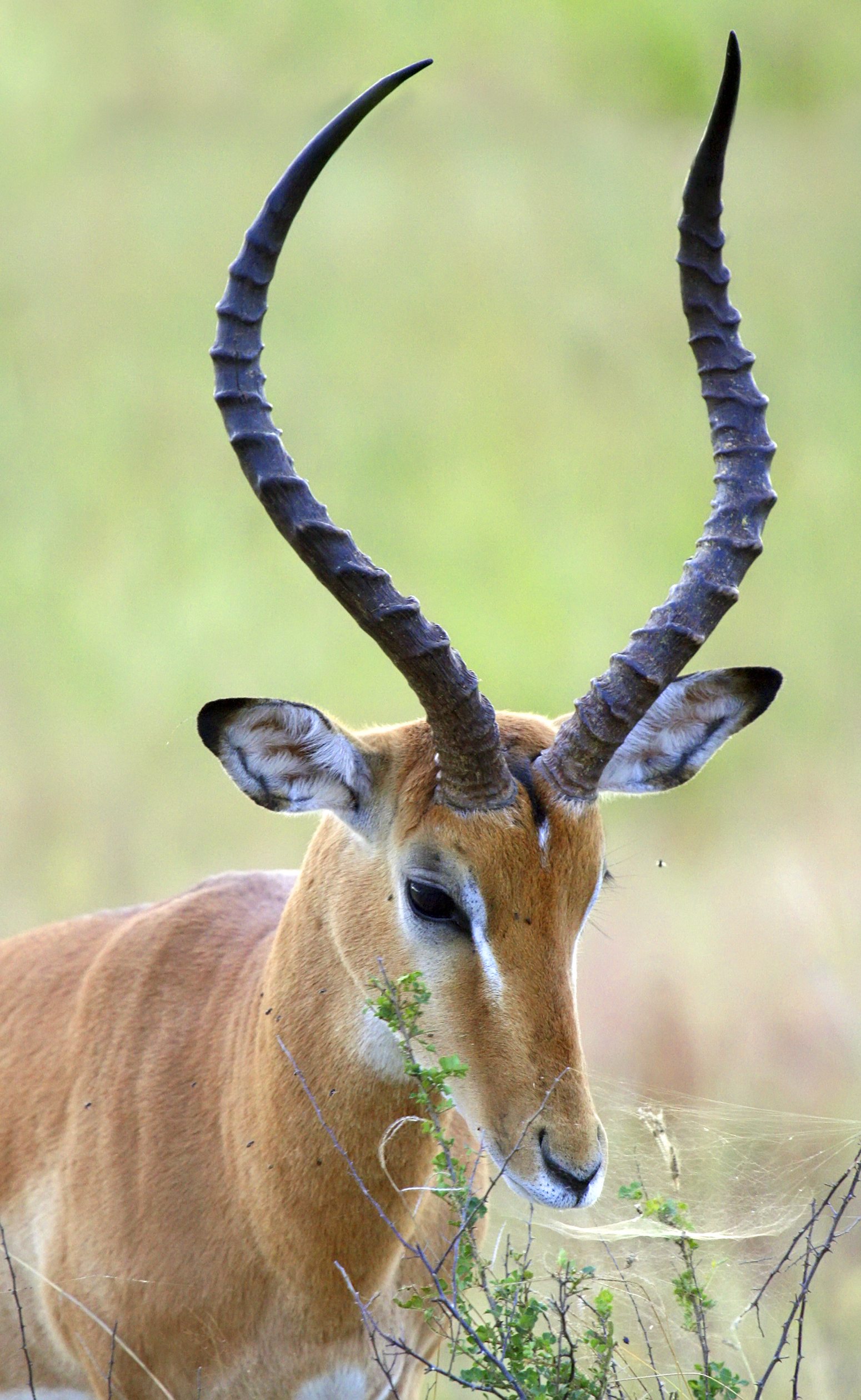
A pair of horns on a male impala

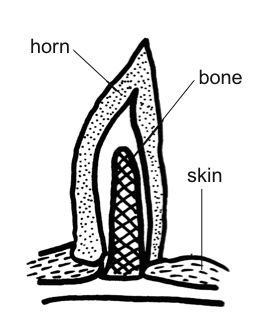
Anatomy of an animal's horn

A horn is a permanent pointed projection on the head of various animals that consists of a covering of keratin and other proteins surrounding a core of live bone. Horns are distinct from antlers, which are not permanent. In mammals, true horns are found mainly among the ruminant artiodactyls, in the families Antilocapridae (pronghorn) and Bovidae (cattle, goats, antelope etc.). Cattle horns arise from subcutaneous connective tissue (under the scalp) and later fuse to the underlying frontal bone.

One pair of horns is usual; however, two or more pairs occur in a few wild species and in some domesticated breeds of sheep. Polycerate (multi-horned) sheep breeds include the Hebridean, Icelandic, Jacob, Manx Loaghtan, and the Navajo-Churro.

Horns usually have a curved or spiral shape, often with ridges or fluting. In many species, only males have horns. Horns start to grow soon after birth and continue to grow throughout the life of the animal (except in pronghorns, which shed the outer layer annually, but retain the bony core). Partial or deformed horns in livestock are called scurs. Similar growths on other parts of the body are not usually called horns, but spurs, claws, or hooves, depending on the part of the body on which they occur.

== Types of horns ==
- Bighorn sheep have backward-sweeping, forward-curving horns.
- Bison have upward-curving horns that grow from the sides of the head.
- Mountain goats have curved horns that taper backward from the forehead and are typically about 20 to 30 cm long.

== Other hornlike growths ==
The term "horn" is also popularly applied to other hard and pointed features attached to the head of animals in various other families:

- Giraffidae: Giraffes have one or more pairs of bony bumps on their heads, called ossicones. These are covered with furred skin.
- Cervidae: Most deer have antlers, which are not true horns and made of bone. When fully developed, antlers are dead bone without a horn or skin covering; they are borne only by adults (usually males, except for reindeer) and are shed and regrown each year.
- Rhinocerotidae: The "horns" of rhinoceroses are made of keratin, the same substance as fingernails, and grow continuously, but do not have a bone core.
- Chamaeleonidae: Many chameleons, most notably the Jackson's chameleon, possess horns on their skulls, and have a keratin covering.
- Ceratopsidae: The "horns" of the Triceratops were extensions of its skull bones, although debate exists over whether they had a keratin covering.
- Abelisauridae: Various abelisaurid theropods, such as Carnotaurus and Majungasaurus possessed extensions of the frontal bone which were likely covered in some form of keratinous integument.
- Horned lizards (Phrynosoma): These lizards have horns on their heads which have a hard keratin covering over a bony core, like mammalian horns.
- Insects: Some insects (such as rhinoceros beetles) have hornlike structures on the head or thorax (or both). These are pointed outgrowths of the hard chitinous exoskeleton. Some (such as stag beetles) have greatly enlarged jaws, also made of chitin.
- Canidae: Golden jackals were once thought to occasionally develop a horny growth on the skull, which is associated with magical powers in south-eastern Asia. Although no evidence of its existence has been found, it remains a common belief in South Asia.
- Azendohsauridae: the skull of the triassic azendohsaurid archosauromorph Shringasaurus possessed two massive, forward-facing conical horns, which were likely covered in cornified sheaths in life.
- Anhimidae: The horned screamer possesses an entirely keratinous spine, which is loosely connected to its skull.

Many mammal species in various families have tusks, which often serve the same functions as horns, but are in fact oversized teeth. These include the Moschidae (Musk deer, which are ruminants), Suidae (Wild Boars), Proboscidea (Elephants), Monodontidae (Narwhals) and Odobenidae (Walruses). Polled animals or pollards are those of normally-horned (mainly domesticated) species whose horns have been removed, or which have not grown. In some cases such animals have small horny growths in the skin where their horns would be – these are known as scurs.

=== On humans ===
Cutaneous horns are the only examples of horns growing on humans.

Cases of people growing horns have been historically described, sometimes with mythical status. Researchers have not however discovered photographic evidence of the phenomenon. There are human cadaveric specimens that show outgrowings, but these are instead classified as osteomas or other excrescences.

The phenomenon of humans with horns has been observed in countries lacking advanced medicine. There are living people, several in China, with cases of cutaneous horns, most common in the elderly.

Some people, notably The Enigma, have horn implants; that is, they have implanted silicone beneath the skin as a form of body modification.

== Animal uses of horns ==
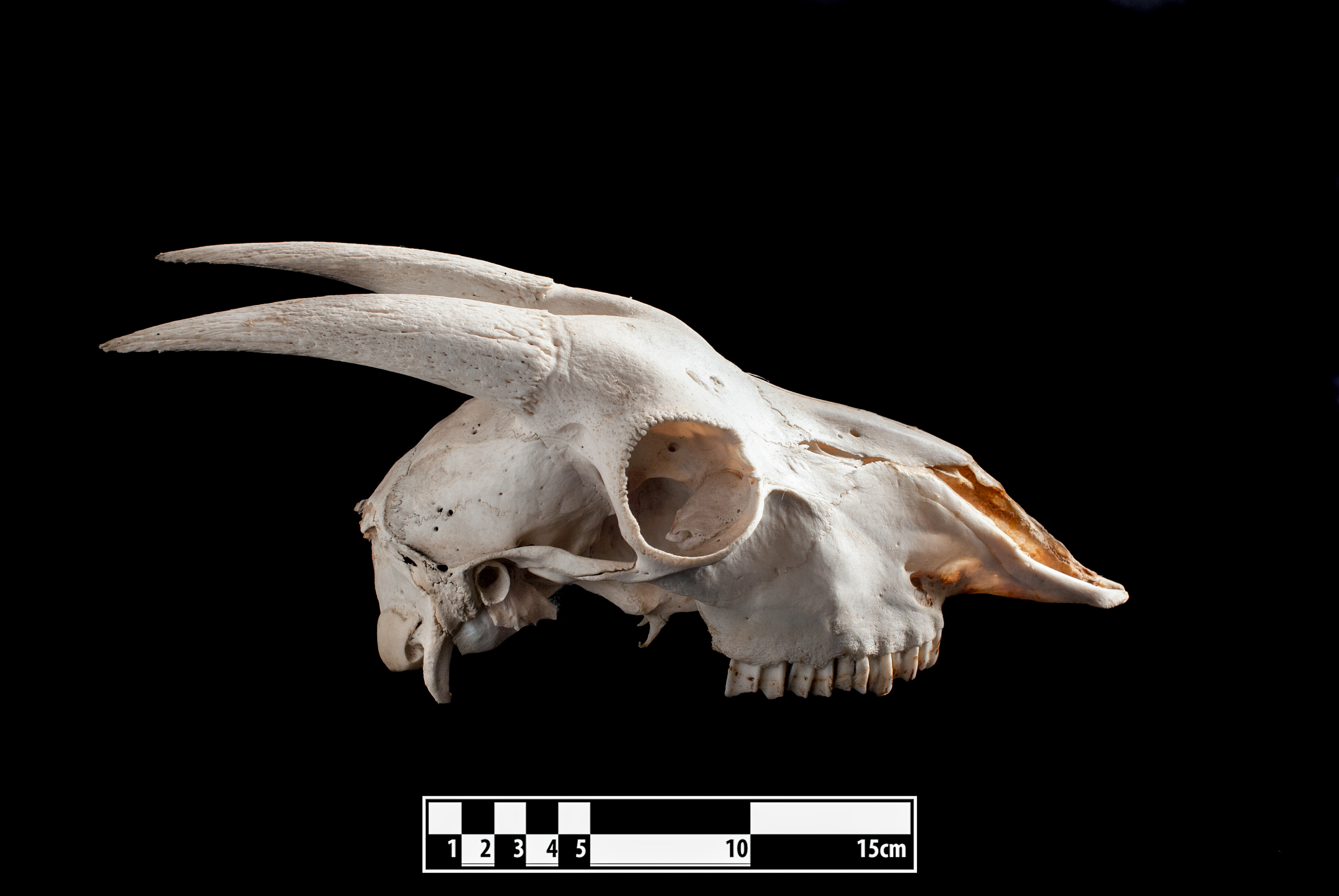
Goat skull piece

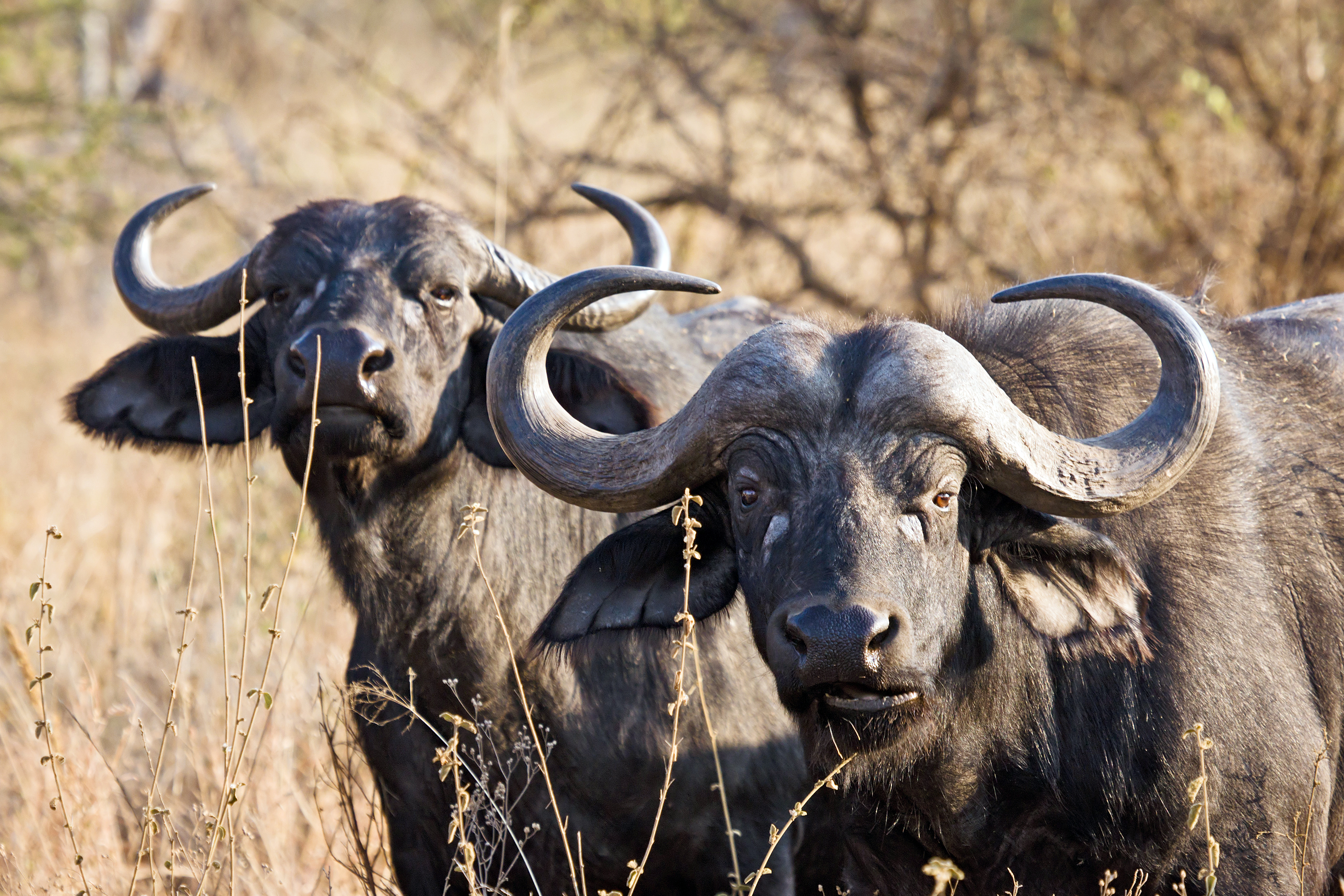
African buffalo (both sexes have horns)

Animals have a variety of uses for horns and antlers, including defending themselves from predators and fighting members of their own species (horn fighting) for territory, dominance or mating priority. Horns are usually present only in males but in some species, females too may possess horns. It has been theorized by researchers that taller species living in the open are more visible from longer distances and more likely to benefit from horns to defend themselves against predators. Female bovids that are not hidden from predators due to their large size or open savannah-like habitat are more likely to bear horns than small or camouflaged species.

In addition, horns may be used to root in the soil or strip bark from trees. In animal courtship, many use horns in displays. For example, the male blue wildebeest reams the bark and branches of trees to impress the female and lure her into his territory. Some animals such as goats with true horns use them for cooling with the blood vessels in the bony core allowing them to function as a radiator.

After the death of a horned animal, the keratin may be consumed by the larvae of the horn moth.

=== Horn fighting ===
During horn fighting, two animals of the same species tilt their head towards one another. They then proceed to ram into each other.

For example, in bighorn sheep, when two males meet each other, each tilts its head towards each other to give a good view of the horns. If the horns are approximately the same size, the sheep may fight to establish dominance. However, if the horn of one sheep is larger than the other, the sheep with the smaller horns will generally back off. Those sheep are usually young sheep whose horns have not had enough time to grow.

== Human uses of horns ==
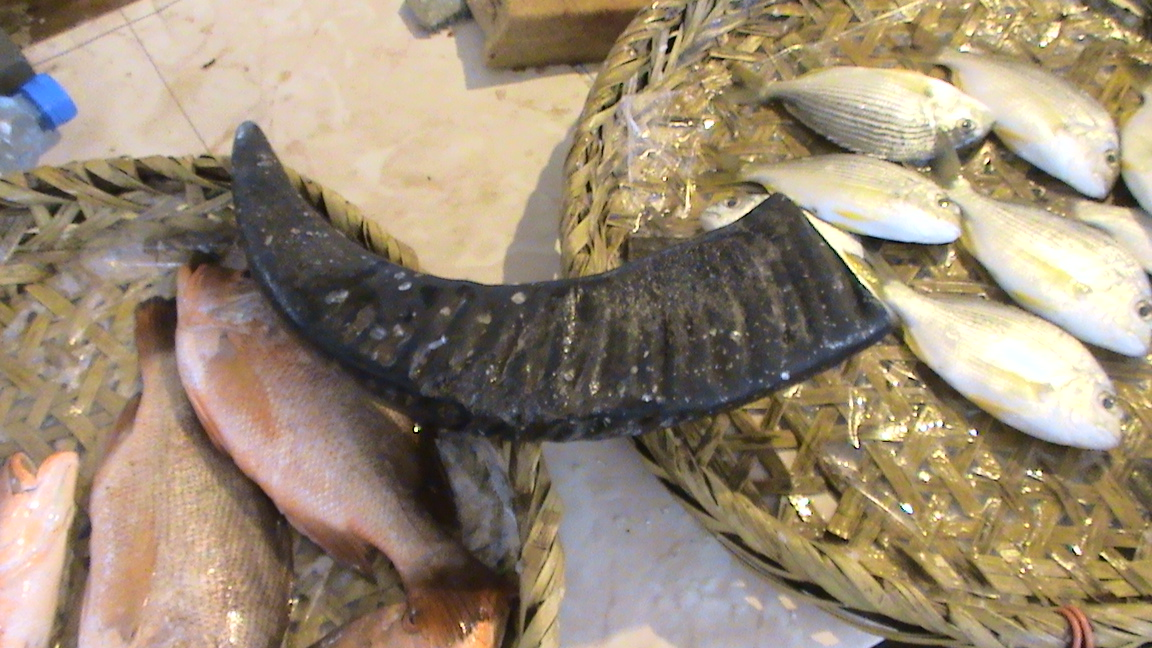
Water buffalo horn used as a hammer with cleaver to cut fish in southeast China

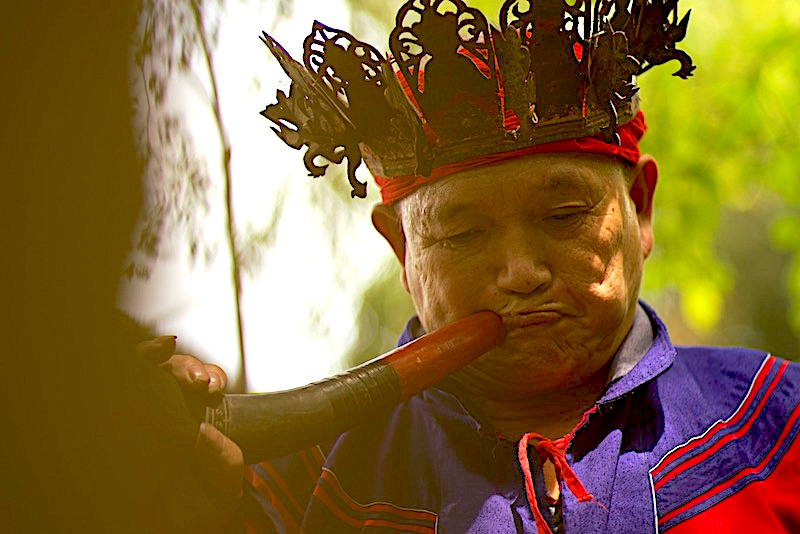
Miao folk religion ritual participant blowing a water buffalo horn during the sacrifice ceremony, in Xiangxi Tujia and Miao Autonomous Prefecture of Hunan

- Horned animals are sometimes hunted so their mounted head or horns can be displayed as a hunting trophy or as decorative objects.
- Some cultures use bovid horns as musical instruments, for example, the shofar. These have evolved into brass instruments in which, unlike the trumpet, the bore gradually increases in width through most of its length—that is to say, it is conical rather than cylindrical. These are called horns, though now made of metal.
- Drinking horns are bovid horns removed from the bone core, cleaned, polished, and used as drinking vessels. (This is similar to the legend of the cornucopia.) It has been suggested that the shape of a natural horn was also the model for the rhyton, a horn-shaped drinking vessel.
- Powder horns were originally bovid horns fitted with lids and carrying straps, used to carry gunpowder. Powder flasks of any material may be referred to as powder horns.
- Shoehorns were originally made from slices of bovid horn, which provided the right curving shape and a smooth surface.
- Antelope horns are used in traditional Chinese medicine.
- Horns consist of keratin, and the term "horn" is used to refer to this material, sometimes including similarly solid keratin from other parts of animals, such as hoofs. Horn may be used as a material in tools, furniture and decoration, among other uses. In these applications, horn is valued for its hardness, and it has given rise to the expression hard as horn. Horn is somewhat thermoplastic and (like tortoiseshell) was formerly used for many purposes where plastic would now be used. Horn may be used to make glue.
- Horn bows are bows made from a combination of horn, sinew and usually wood. These materials allow more energy to be stored in a short bow than wood alone.
- Horns and horn tips from various animals have been used for centuries in the manufacture of scales, grips, or handles for knives and other weapons, and beginning in the 19th century, for the handle scales of handguns.
- Horn buttons may be made from horns, and historically also hooves which are a similar material. The non-bony part of the horn or hoof may be softened by heating to a temperature just above the boiling point of water, then molded in metal dies, or the hollow lower part of the horn may be slit spirally lengthwise and then flattened in a vise between wood boards, again after heating, and later cut with a holesaw or similar tool into round or other shaped blanks which are finished on a lathe or by hand. Toggle buttons are made by cutting off the solid tips of horns and perforating them. Antler buttons, and buttons made from hooves are not technically horn buttons, but are often referred to as such in popular parlance. Horns from cattle, water buffalo, and sheep are all used for commercial button making, and of other species as well, on a local and non-commercial basis.
- Horn combs were common in the era before replacement by plastic, and are still made.
- Horn needle cases and other small boxes, particularly of water buffalo horn, are still made. One occasionally finds horn used as a material in antique snuff boxes.
- Horn strips for inlaying wood are a traditional technique.
- Carved horn hairpins and other jewelry such as brooches and rings are manufactured, particularly in Asia, including for the souvenir trade.
- Horn is used in artwork for small, detailed carvings. It is an easily worked and polished material, is strong and durable, and in the right variety, beautiful.
- Horn chopsticks are found in Asian countries from highland Nepal and Tibet to the Pacific coast. Typically they are not the common material, but rather are higher quality decorative articles. Similarly other horn flatware, notably spoons, continues to be manufactured for decorations and other purposes.
- Long dice made of horn that have a rodlike elongated shape with four numbered faces and two small unnumbered end faces continue to be manufactured in Asia where they are traditionally used in games like Chaupar (Pachisi) and many others.
- Horn is sometimes found in walking sticks, cane handles, and shafts. In the latter use, the horn elements may be cut into short cylindrical segments held together by a metal core.
- Horned deities appear in various guises across many world religions and mythologies.
- Horned helmets arise in different cultures, for ritual purposes rather than combat.
- Horns were treated and cut into strips to make semi-transparent windows in the vernacular architecture of the Medieval Ages.

== Dehorning ==
In some instances, wildlife parks may decide to remove the horn of some animals (such as rhinos) as a preventive measure against poaching. Rhinoceros horns, unlike true horns, can be safely sawn off without hurting the animal (it is similar to clipping toe nails). When the animal were to be poached, the animal is generally killed as it is shot first. Park rangers however may decide to tranquilize the animal instead to remove the horn.

== Gallery ==
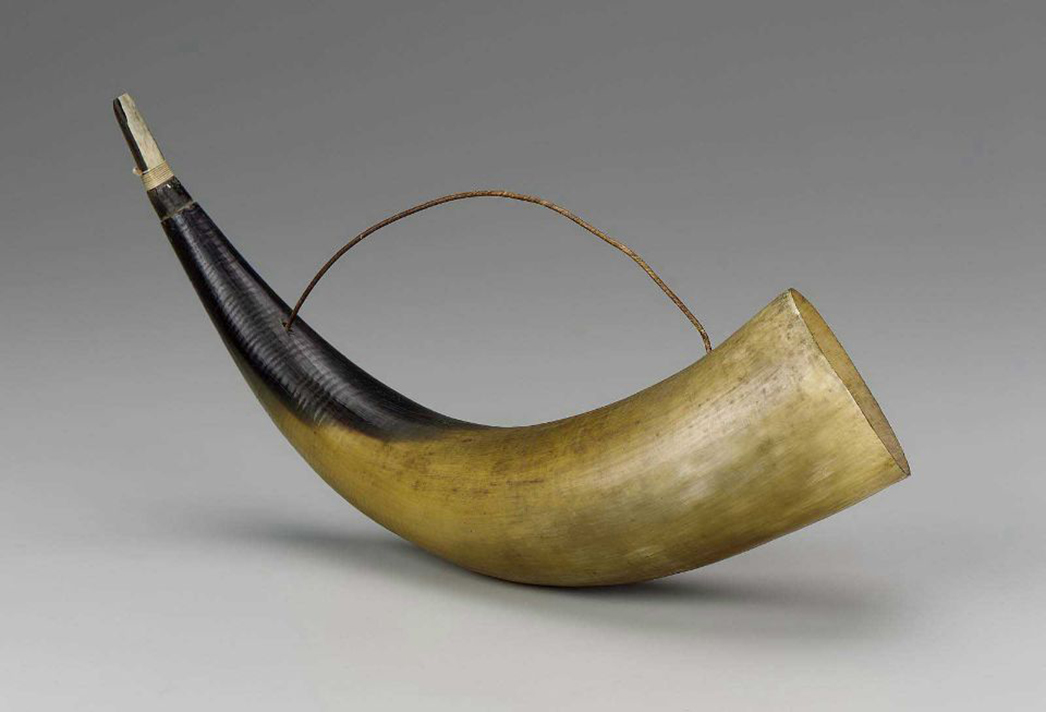
Erkencho, musical instrument made from a horn

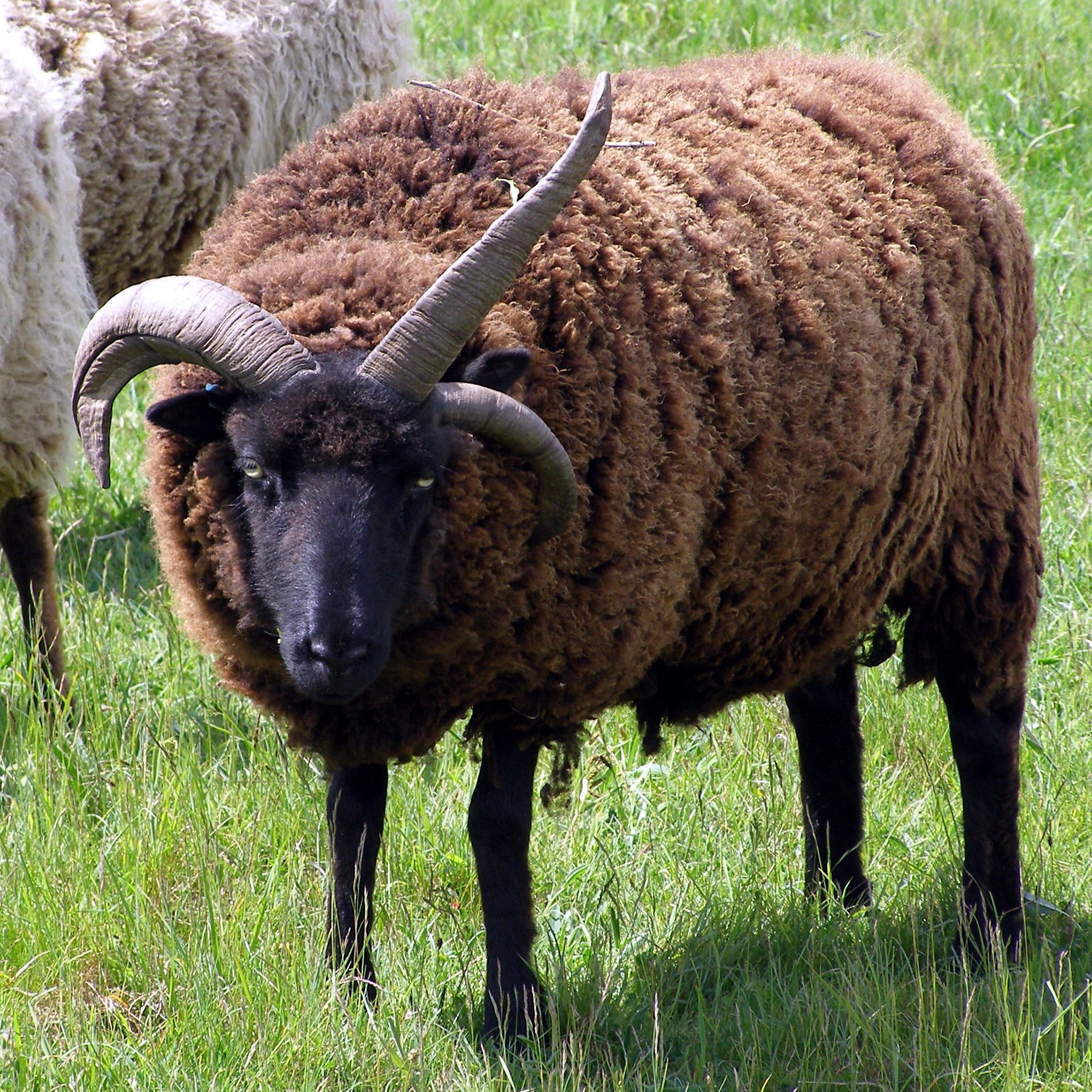
A Hebridean sheep with one horn on one side and two on the other

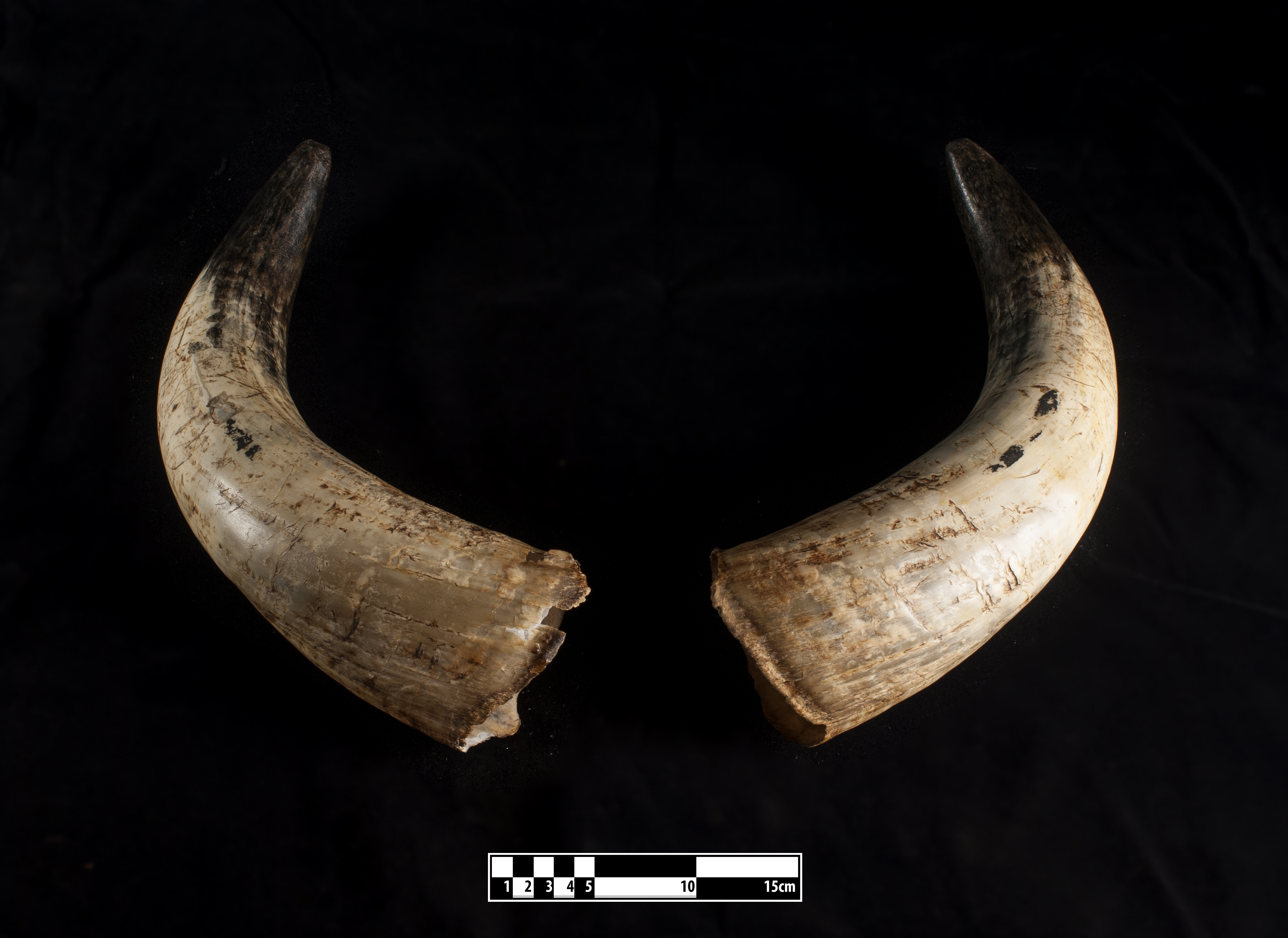
Water buffalo horn (Bubalus bubalis)

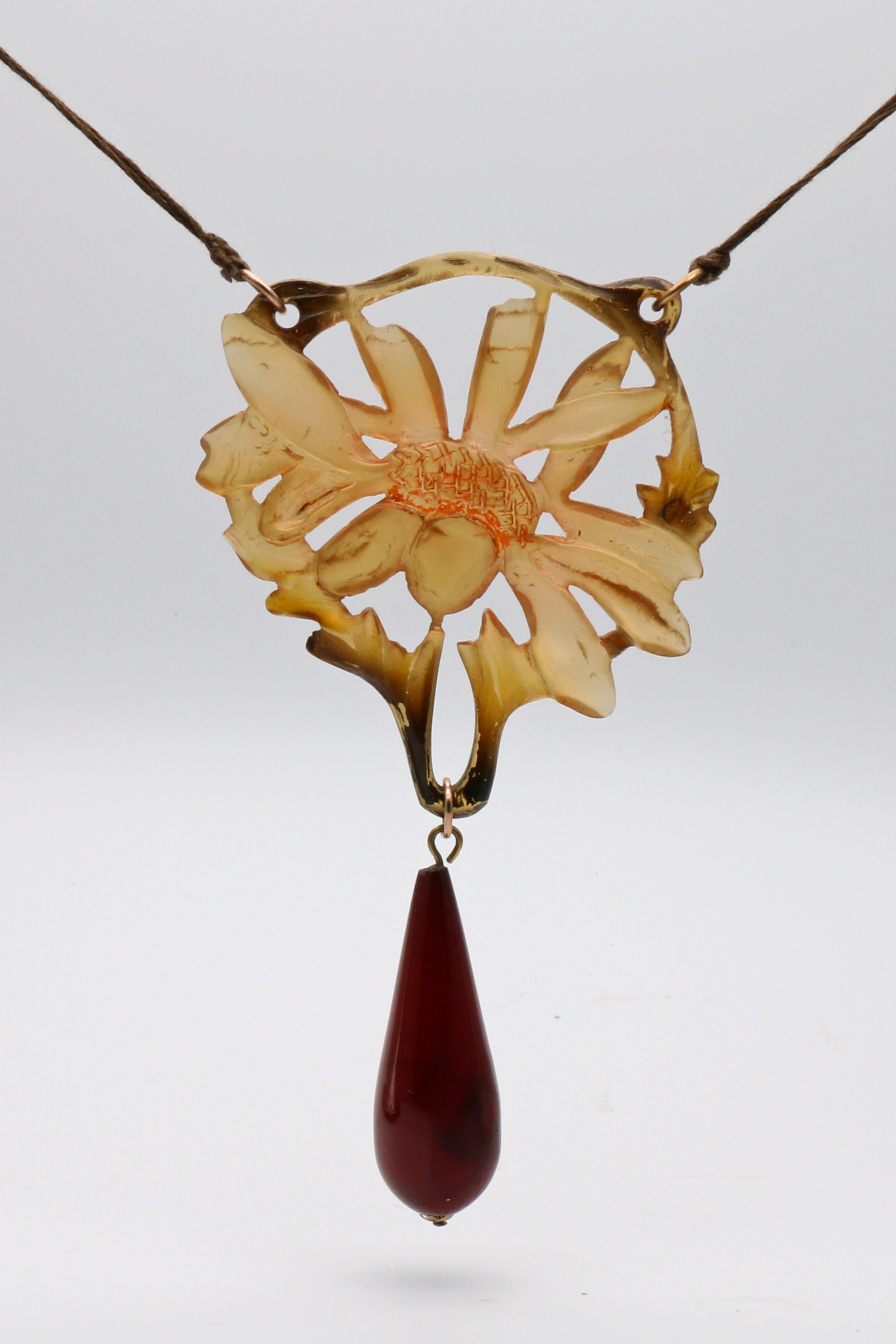
Elizabeth Bonté Art Nouveau horn necklace

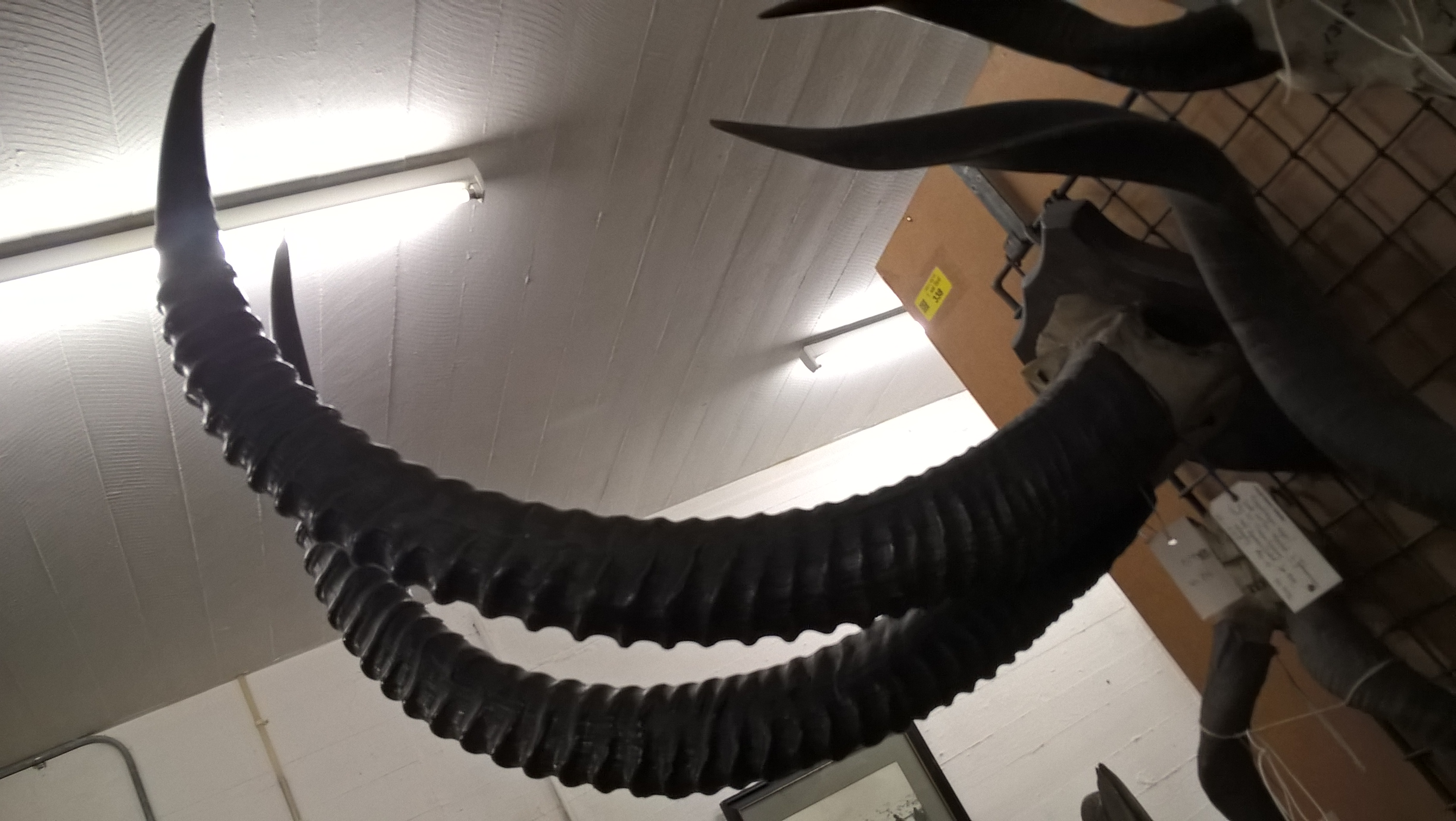
Sable antelope mounted horns, at the Zoological Museum, Denmark

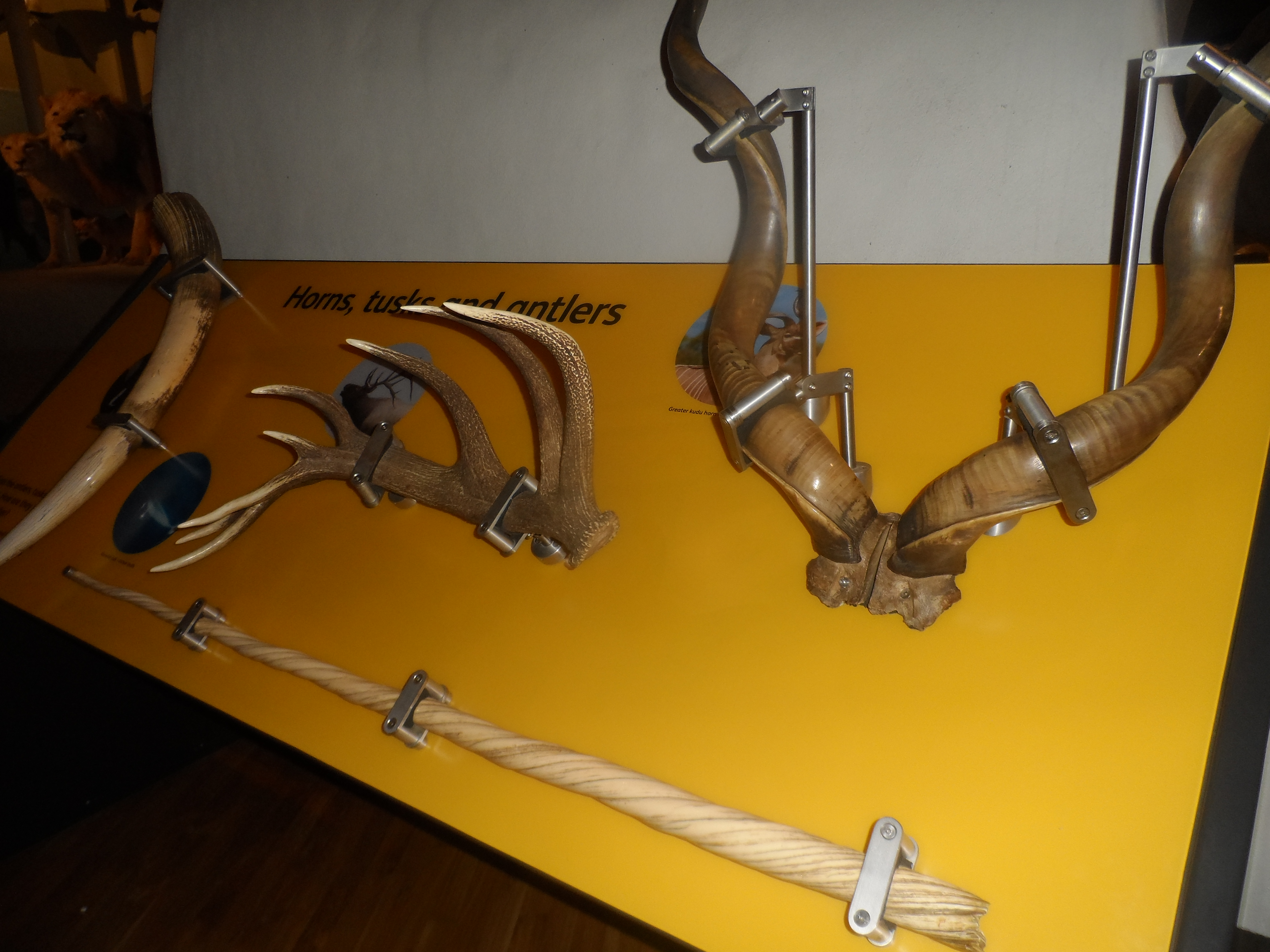
Horns, tusks and antlers in the National Museum of Scotland

== See also ==
- List of animals with horns or tusks
- Horned God - a primary deities found in Wicca
- Sign of the horns – Hand gesture
- Conservation and restoration of bone, horn, and antler objects – Preservation of heritage collections
- Bovine anatomy
