= Conservation and restoration of bone, horn, and antler objects =

Preservation of heritage collections

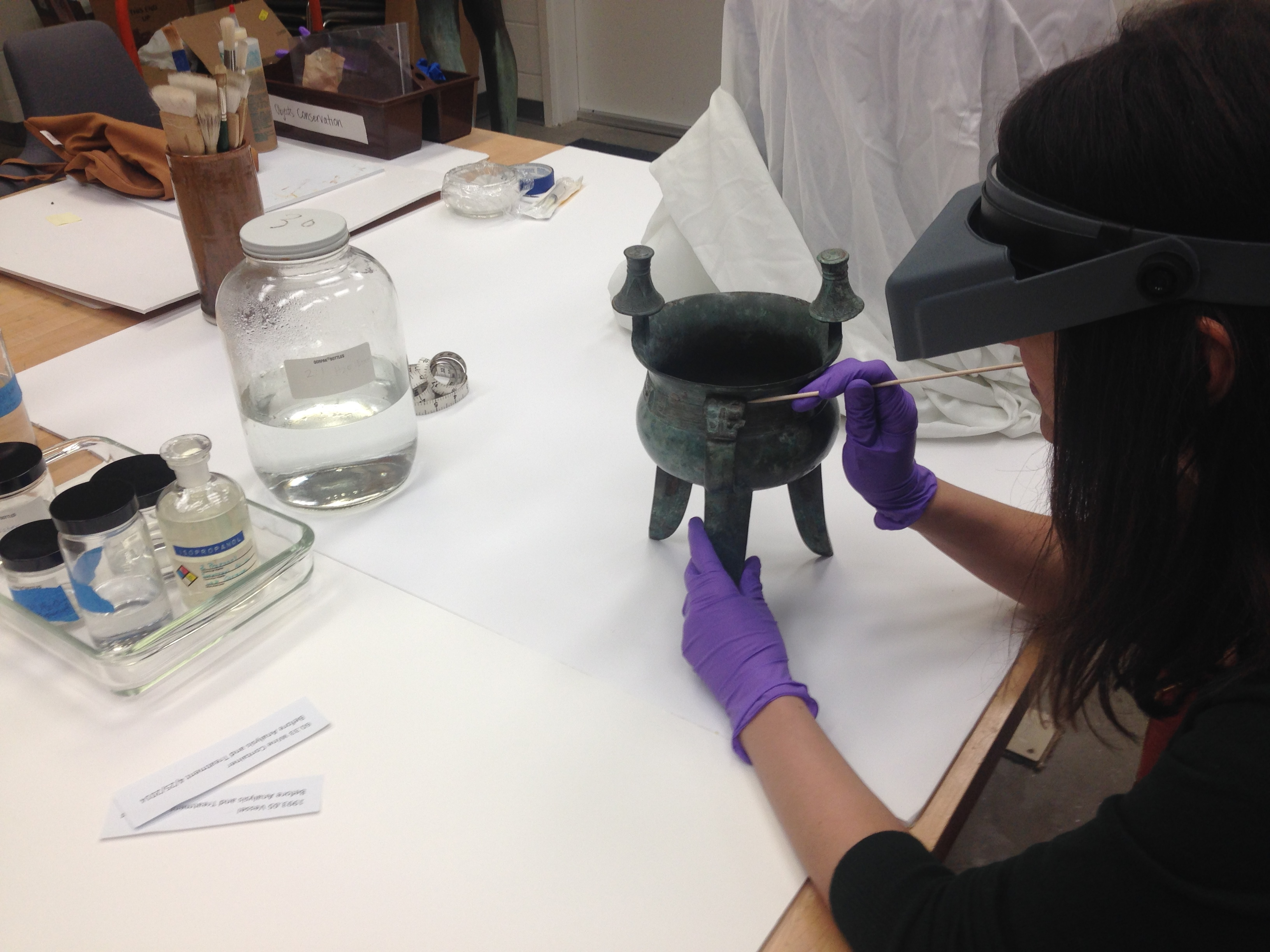
Conservator examines a Chinese vessel.

Conservation-restoration of bone, horn, and antler objects involves the processes by which the deterioration of objects either containing or made from bone, horn, and antler is contained and prevented. Their use has been documented throughout history in many societal groups as these materials are durable, plentiful, versatile, and naturally occurring/replenishing.

While all three materials have historically been used in the creation of tools, ceremonial objects, instruments, and decorative objects, their individual compositions differ slightly, thus affecting their care. Bone is porous, as it is a mineralized connective tissue composed of calcium, phosphorus, fluoride, and ossein, a protein. Horn consists of a keratin sheath over a bony outgrowth, as seen with cows and other animals. Antlers are a reoccurring bony growth on the skulls of male members of the deer family (apart from reindeer/caribou, in which both males and females produce antlers.) Unlike horn, which is a permanent feature, antlers are typically shed and regrown each year.

While these materials have a well-documented past as sturdy and reliable choices for tools, decoration, ceremonial objects, and more, they are organic materials that deteriorate if not treated properly. Deterioration may occur if objects made from these materials are subjected to extreme heat, dryness, moisture, or a combination of heat and moisture due to their highly porous nature. Other sources of deterioration include pests, acids, and overexposure to light. It is highly recommended that a conservator be contacted if a museum has bone, horn, or antler objects in need of conservation, as many adhesives, liquid cleaners, and protective coatings may irreversibly damage the object.

== Identification and composition ==
Many museums contain objects in their collection that are made of bone, antler or horn. One of the most important steps in the conservation of these objects is determining which material it is.

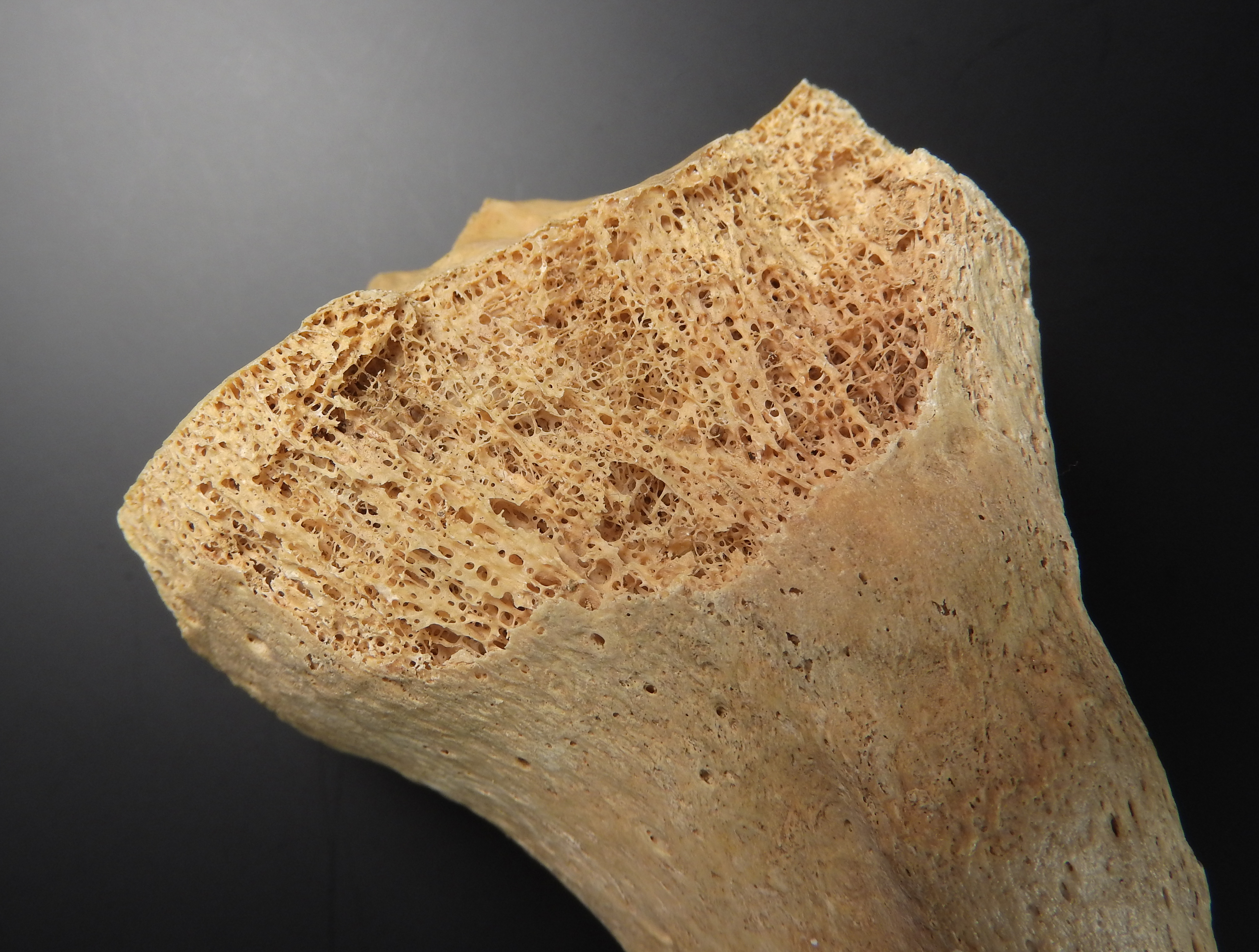
Tibia - detail of bone tissue (proximal end)

=== Bone ===
Bone, which has a very similar chemical make-up to ivory, consists of inorganic materials which provide strength and rigidity and organic components that provide the capacity for growth and repair. Unlike ivory, which has no marrow or blood vessel system, bone has a spongy central portion of marrow from which extend tiny blood vessels; bone is therefore highly porous. Bone is also made of both mineral and carbon-based materials; the mineral-based are calcium, phosphorus, and fluoride; the carbon-based is the protein ossein. Bone also includes the mineral hydroxyapatite, "A calcium phosphate mineral which forms a hard outer covering over the collagen and protein matrix," or organic material.

Bone housed in museum collections come from many different sources; mammals, fish, birds, and in rare cases humans may all be included in a museum's collection. Bones in these collections can come in many shapes and sizes. It can be used in its natural form or polished with sand and other abrasives to create a smooth, glossy surface. It may also undergo a burning process, which gives it a blue-black to whitish-gray color.

Bones of all kinds have been used to create many different objects throughout history, from tools such as hammers and fishhooks to weapons such as spears, arrows, and harpoon points, or other items, such as pendants, hairpins, gaming pieces, musical instruments, and ceremonial objects.

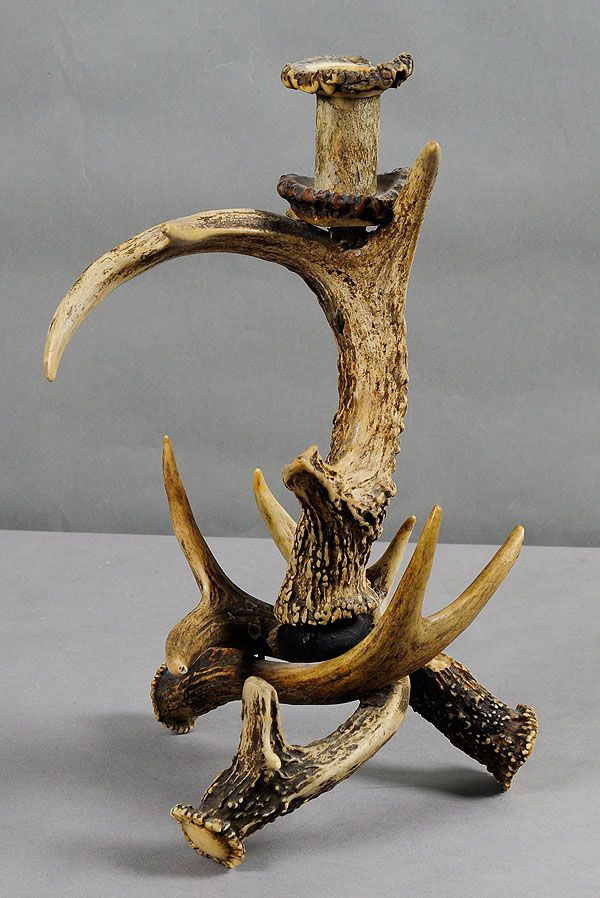
Rustic deer antler candle holder

=== Antler ===
Antler, a modified form of bone, grows out of the skull bones of certain species of animals, such as deer, and is typically shed once a year. It consists of a thick layer of compact bone, an inner section of spongy bone, and internal blood vessels that are fewer in number and more irregular than the ones present in bone. Antler is denser and heavier than skeletal bone and differs from skeletal bone in its external appearance. Skeletal bone is usually smooth except for areas of attachment to muscles, tendons, and ligaments, while antler generally has raised bumps and protrusions across the surface.

Similarly to bone, antler may be used in its natural form, polished with abrasives for a glossy surface, and treated with a burning process for a charred finish and color. Antler has been used for numerous objects throughout history including tools such as hammer batons, knife handles, pressure flakers, and conical arrow points.

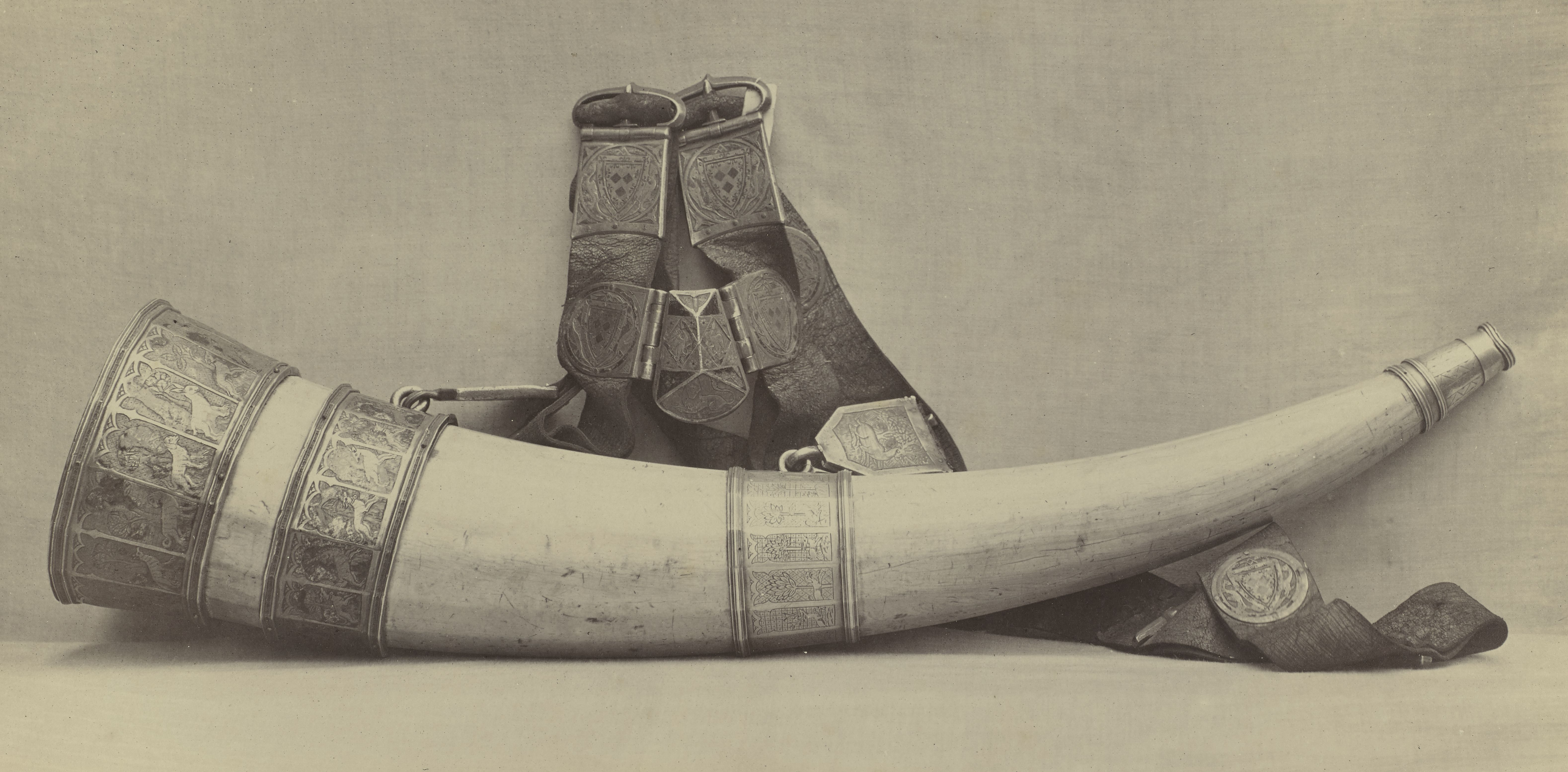
The Bruce Horn or Savernake Horn

=== Horn ===
Horn is the outer covering of a bony outgrowth on an animal's skull, such as a cow. It consists of a mass of very hard, hair-like filaments called keratin, cemented together around a spongy internal bone core. This layering effect continues to grow over time, resulting in a cone-within-cone structure. Unlike antlers, horns are permanent and not seasonally shed. Another distinguishing factor from bone and antler is the fine parallel lines that are present on the surface of the horn. Horn comes in a great variety of sizes and colors, including white, green, red, brown, and black.

Horn can be used in its natural state, boiled, cut, molded to other shapes, or used in flat sheets. It has been used for a variety of objects including ceremonial decorations, utensils such as spoons and containers, gaming pieces, and combs.

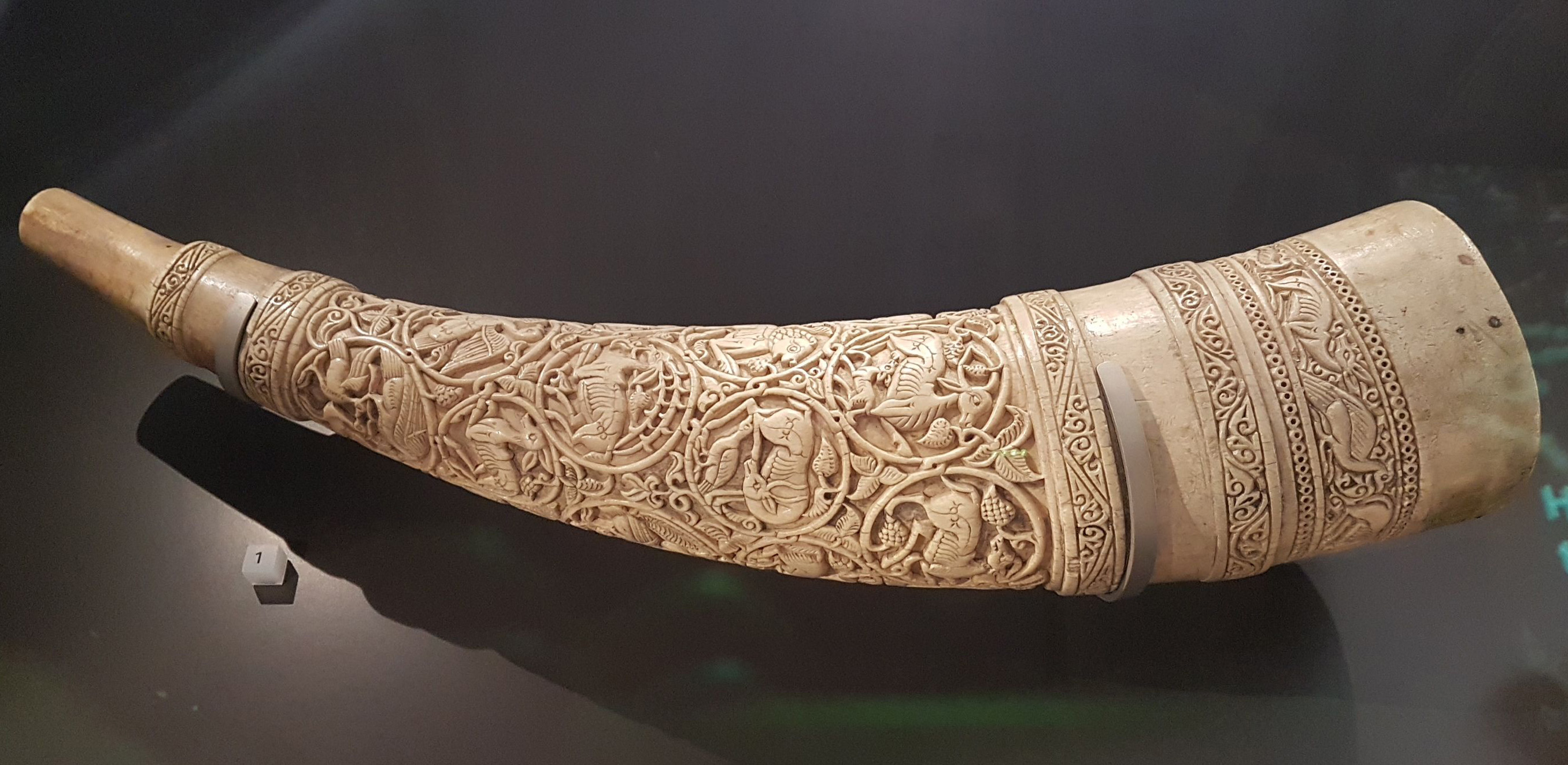
Carved ivory horn, National Museum of Scotland, Edinburgh

=== Ivory ===
Many mammals, such as elephants, walrus, narwhals, whales, and hippopotami, produce tusks and teeth of ivory that can be used for carving; these are the most commonly found ornamental ivory objects in collections today. As mentioned above, ivory is very similar to bone in its chemical make-up. Like bone, it is composite, consisting of both organic and inorganic materials that at once allow for its rigid surface as well as its capacity for growth. However, while the chemical compositions are similar, the physical structure of bone and ivory are very different. For example, "ivory is dentine—the part of the tooth that is covered by enamel." Ivory is tooth material, meaning "it is usually whiter, harder, denser, and heavier than bone," which has a spongy central portion that ivory does not. Moreover, "ivory, which has multiple layers, is more dense than bone or antler and is more likely to crack or delaminate while drying."

Identifying the type of ivory you are working with can be done by examining the intersecting patterns that cross the surface of the ivory. Elephant ivory, for example, will exhibit a pattern of intersecting arcs called schreger lines, that hatch across the surface at 115-degree angles.

Examples of ivory objects include: horns, handles and inlays for ceremonial weaponry, jewelry, and decorative arts; statuettes, regalia masks, and even triptychs.

== Agents of deterioration ==
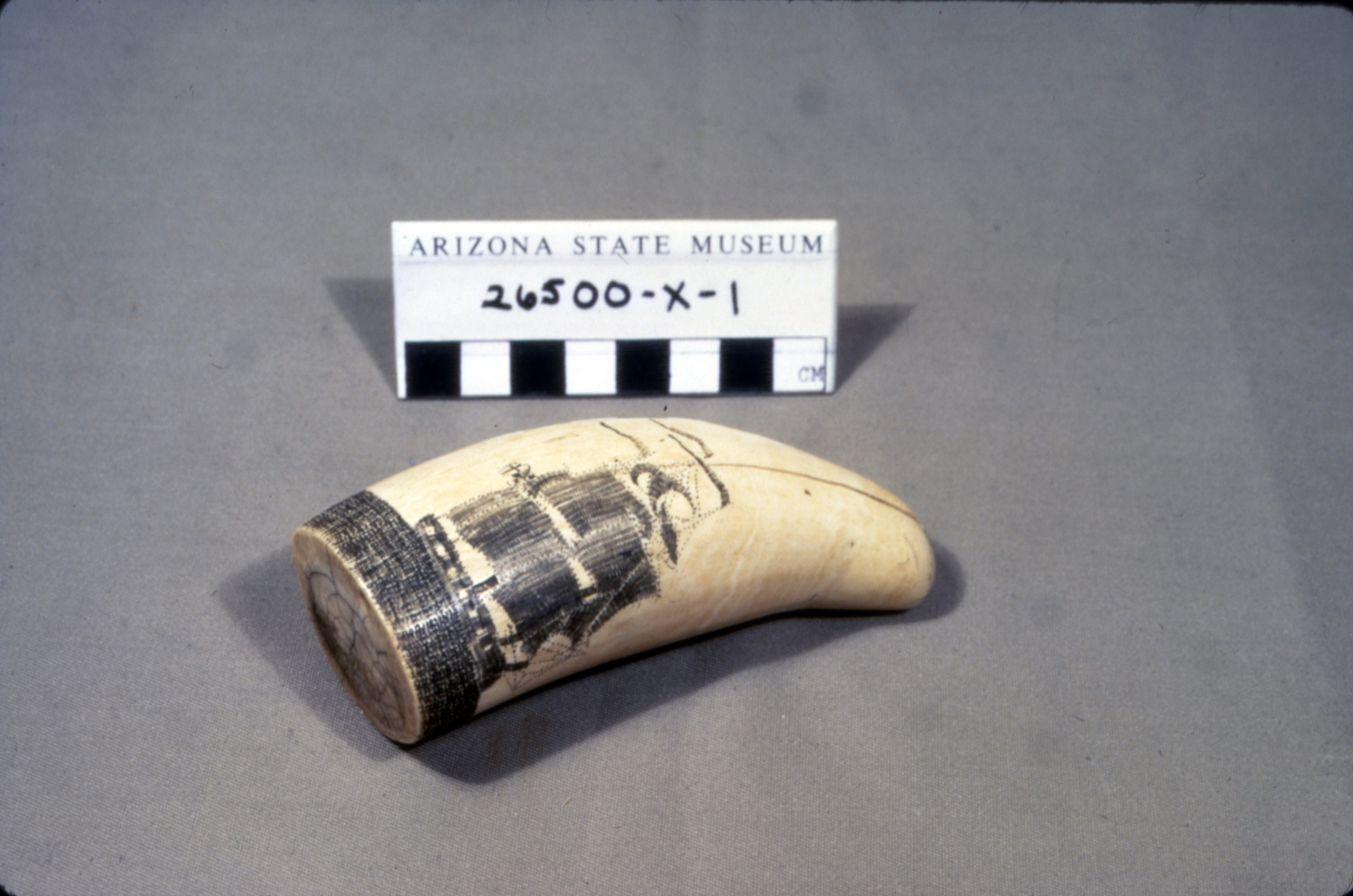
Whale tooth, Scrimshaw. Split due to damage from humidity

The term agent of deterioration is used to identify the major activities, natural and man-made, that threaten a museum collection. A key preventative measure in conservation is surveying the environment and making a risk assessment of the biggest threats to the collection. The environment ranges from the storage container, storage room, the building, what is outside the building, the surrounding businesses and landscape, the climate and geography, and the year round weather changes.

=== Physical forces ===
Physical forces that can damage a collection are the vibration, shock, gravity, and abrasion that can be gradual over time or sudden and catastrophic. This can be from an earthquake, being dropped, or stress of compression from the general weight of the object.

The most common physical forces on bone, antler, and horn are mishandling, over handling, being dropped, or being unbalanced while on display or in storage causing stress compression on weak spots. Sweat and oils left behind bare hands assist in promoting mold growth and other damage to the objects. Wearing gloves, handling the object with two hands (rather than one), and avoiding any weak spots on an object will help prevent damage.

=== Fire ===
Fire can completely destroy the object. Fires are not common, but they are highly destructive. Heat from a nearby fire can cause objects to become brittle or crack, and cause its destruction. Smoke can stain the object. Damage from fire is irreversible. Objects that are made of organic materials are "highly susceptible to combustion, particularly if very dry." The smoke damage can come from a fire "both inside and outside of the museum".

=== Water ===
Water can come from roofs leaking during rainstorms, floods, fire sprinkler systems, or broken pipes. It can soften and destroy the bone, antler, or horn if it becomes waterlogged. Mold and mildew growth can cause further damage. If the water in the crevices or pores of the bone, antler, or horn were to freeze, it would crack the object.

=== Crime ===
Theft and vandalism are everywhere, therefore, keeping the objects in locked display cases or locked storage while using surveillance cameras in the gallery and limiting personnel in collections is the most preventative measures.

=== Pests ===
Pests are a "living organism that are able to disfigure, damage, and destroy material culture. Dermestid beetles, silverfish, and rodents are common pests in museums. There are "beneficial" pests, like spiders and centipedes that feed on harmful pests. By knowing what type of pest, their behavior, and preferred habitat, the pests can be controlled. If there are beneficial pests, then there are harmful pests. Disrupt the habitat of the harmful pest and both will go away.

"Once established, populations can more easily move on to collections storage spaces and other relatively fortified nonpublic spaces." Pests like to snack on organic matter and cause damage to the object. Trap and monitor systems can identify what pest is present while learning about the habits of that pest can tell you how to get rid of it; it may be the temperature that was welcoming.

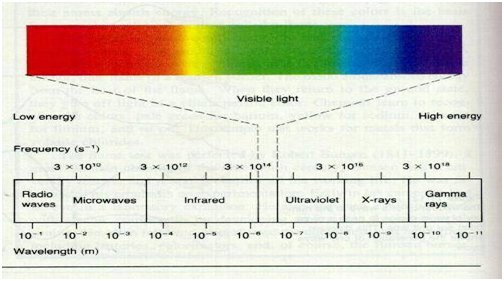
Spectrum of light

=== Light, ultraviolet and infrared ===
"Light, by definition, is the band of radiation to which our eye is sensitive." On the ends of this light spectrum (measured in wavelengths) are ultraviolet radiation and infrared radiation that are not visible to the human eye, but can be very damaging to objects. In museums, filtered lighting with a shorter spectrum that excludes as much ultraviolet and infrared as possible is used to reduce the damage it causes.

Organic materials are highly sensitive to light and the light will cause fading or structural damage if it is not filtered and kept low.

=== Temperature, relative humidity and pollutants ===
Temperature that is too high, too low, or fluctuates in a large range causes materials to become brittle, fragile, or deteriorate through chemical methods such as acid hydrolysis. Relative humidity (RH) is the measure of "humidity" that we perceive in ranges from dry to damp. It is read as the percentage of moisture in the air. Pollutants are the compounds that can cause chemical reactions to object materials. Pollutants include gases, aerosols, car exhaust, emissions from nearby factories or construction work, even the off-gassing of volatile organic compounds from other museum objects.

A filtered air-conditioned storage area can control the temperature and relative humidity while simultaneously circulating the air which removes pollutants and prevents mold growth while creating an uninviting environment for pests. A relative humidity level that is too low (dry, below 30%) with cause the bone, antler, or horn to crack; too high (damp, over 75%) and they are subject to expansion and mold growth that can disintegrate or discolor. Fluctuations over 3% within a 24-hour period can cause objects to swell and contract, weakening the material and causing damage.

=== Disassociation and custodial neglect ===
Dissociation and custodial neglect are the lack of protective care for an object or collection. This ranges from physically misplacing an item, improper storage or display, and lack of cleaning the object and surrounding area that increase the likelihood of the above-mentioned agents of deterioration. "Without vigilant housekeeping, a sufficient amount of debris can easily accumulate in public spaces to support breeding populations" of pests.

== Preventive conservation ==
"Preventive conservation is the most effective method of preservation. The goals are to provide a stable and protective environment and to avoid those conditions that accelerate deterioration." This is especially true of collections pertaining to or consisting of organic materials.

=== Storage and handling ===
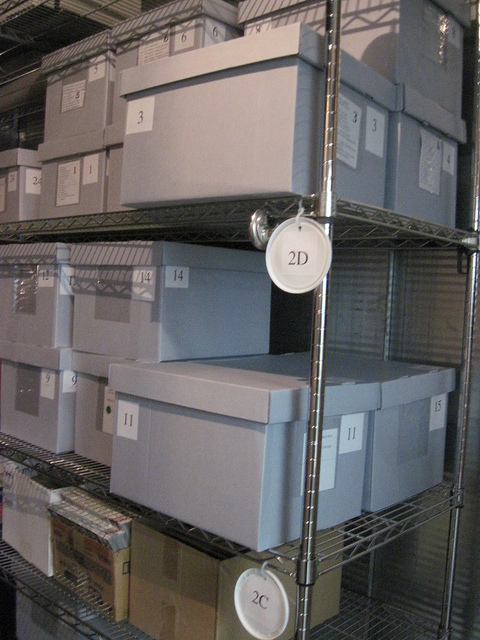
Archival boxes in museum storage

Like any museum objects, the handling of bone, antler, and horn should be conducted in a manner conducive to maintaining the health of the object. While these objects may be handled with clean, dry hands, body oils can stain their surface due to the porosity of these materials. This is especially noticeable on light-colored antler, horn, and bone. Wearing cotton or latex gloves can prevent the spread of harmful oils to these objects.

Items that contain bone, antler, or horn should always be lifted and moved in a manner that is fully supportive and does not place unnecessary stress on weak areas or attachment points; using an acid-free tray is highly recommended. These objects can be protected further by being wrapped in unbuffered, acid-free tissue paper and/or placed in a sealed polyethylene bag when being transported. Bone, antler, and horn objects are stored in tightly closed display cases or drawers to buffer them from sudden changes in temperature and relative humidity while shielding them from dust and dirt. By storing them in the dark, these light-sensitive materials that are dyed or painted are protected. To prevent bumping and chipping, the storage drawers and shelves are lined with a chemically stable cushioning material such as polyethylene or polypropylene sheeting, as opposed to a rubber-based material that can produce unnatural yellowing. Items with holes, straps, appendages, etc. are never hung or supported by said attachments. Instead, they are stored with a support at the base of the item, and a support for the natural position of the handle or strap.

Proper storage also aids in the regulation of temperature, relative humidity, and safe illumination levels, which can have disastrous effects on these organic materials if they fluctuate.

=== Humidity ===
Humidity can prove extremely dangerous to bone, antler, and horn objects, their organic composition makes them especially prone to environmental fluctuations and unstable relative humidity, or RH levels can cause irreversible damage in your collection.

Relative humidity should be controlled to the extent your facility is capable, and fluctuations should be minimized as much as possible to prevent these potential damages. "The specific RH set points for a collection will vary depending according to climatic considerations, the facility’s control capability, the condition of the objects in the collection, the requirements of the material and composition, and the equilibrium moisture content to which the objects are accustomed." The following are recommended levels for organic collections:

- Relative humidity is kept at a level between 30 percent (in the winter) and 55 percent (in the summer) with fluctuations of no more than 15 percent during each season.
- Mold can infest these organic objects when the relative humidity in storage and display areas exceeds 60 percent for extended periods of time. White or greenish fuzzy growth on the surface of these objects is an indicator of a mold infestation. Good ventilation and air circulation prevents mold as well as properly regulating relative humidity levels.

=== Avoiding excessive heat ===
Changes in temperature, such as excessive heat, can destabilize relative humidity levels, which can result in a myriad of conservation issues for organic objects such as embrittlement. A few examples of heat sources that can damage museum objects, and organic materials, in particular, are exhibit lighting, direct sunlight, and their position in relation to heat registers, and radiators. In order to circumvent excessive heating of objects, these common sources should be avoided and temperatures should be kept as constant as possible, no greater than 68 degrees Fahrenheit with no fluctuations of more than +/- 3 degrees a day.

=== Atmospheric pollutants ===
Museum objects require a specific environment. Just as people need air to breathe, objects need air that is free of contaminants and pollution. Unfortunately, in a museum, these two things cannot always be mutually exclusive. People must breathe air and the air often has pollutants in it that can be damaging to the objects in a collection. Industrial areas, construction, heating systems, and even visitors often contribute to this problem. Luckily these can—and should be—eliminated from an object's environment where possible.

Pollutants can be divided into two main categories:

- Gaseous
  - Oxidizing
    - "The process involves the formation of free radicals, acids, and other compounds in many materials," they are especially damaging to organic materials, causing them to become more brittle.
  - Acidic
    - "Acidic substances such as sulphuric acid and nitric acid are corrosive because they readily react with many materials and cause permanent changes."
- Particulate
  - Particles can be either large or small, alkaline or even acidic. They are often abrasive and may scratch the surface of objects when they are being handled, or cleaned. Another consideration is that particles may create residue by settling onto the surface of objects.

Pollutants such as these can damage the structural integrity of organic objects, making them weak, brittle, or even corroding the surface. That is why it is important to apply preventive collections care measures wherever possible. The most effective method is to simply prevent pollutants from entering the building itself, this can be done by purchasing air conditioning and filtering methods to filter the air, and properly ventilate the building. As an added safety measure you can also implement a policy to minimize the opening of doors and windows, as well as retrofitting seals and doing secondary glazing on glass. Finally, pollutant absorbers, such as activated charcoal can be added to display cases, or even placed in storage areas to add another layer of protection.

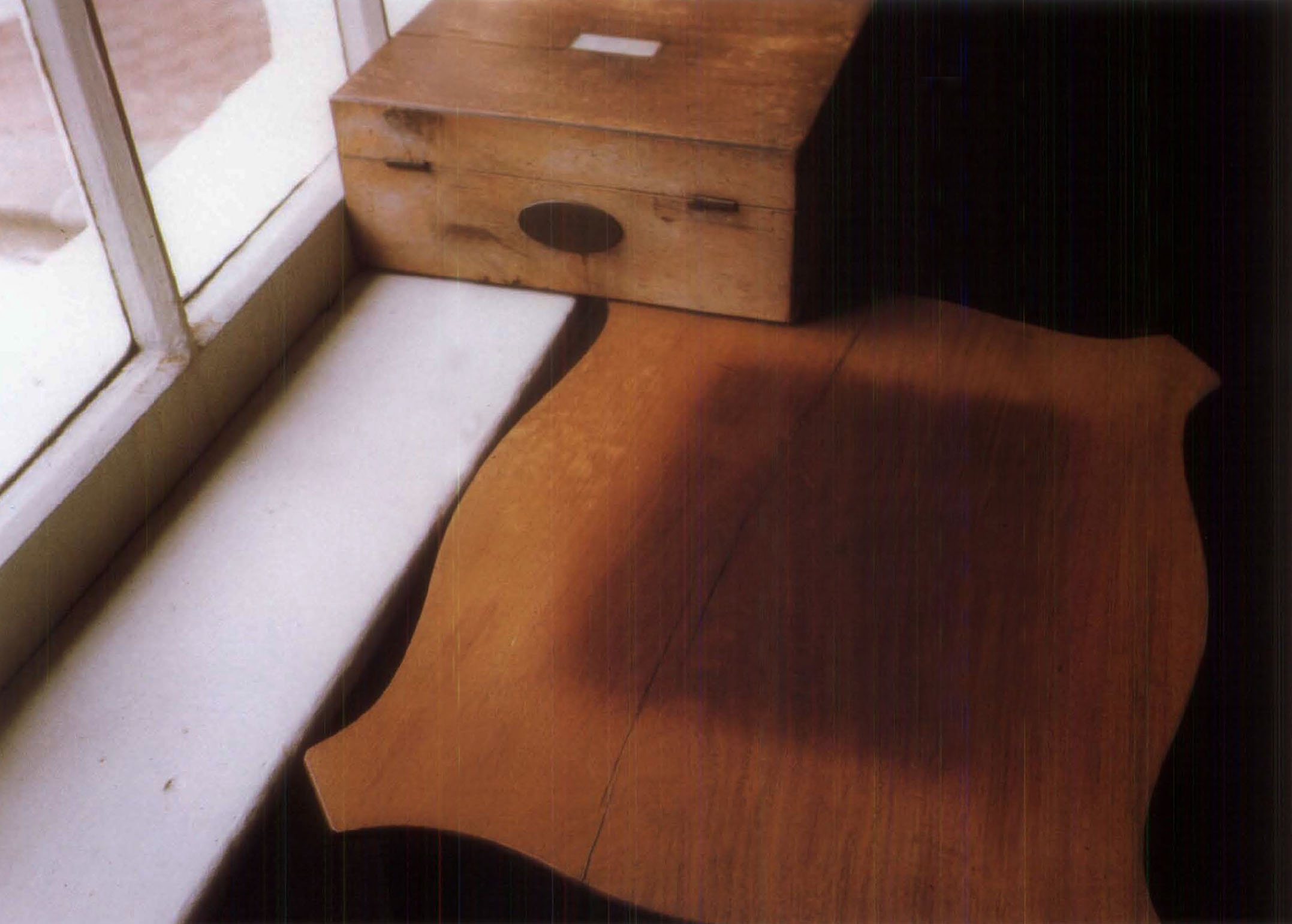
Light has faded the finish of the table top except in the center, where the box rested and shielded the finish. The finish on the top and back of the box is nearly completely lost.

=== Light damage ===
Light damage is cumulative and irreversible, it occurs when an object is exposed to lighting over an extended period of time and is related to the intensity of the lighting. However, an object may see the same amount of light damage if left exposed under low levels for 24 hours or left under intense exhibit lighting for a shorter period of time.

Light can be divided into three categories: Ultraviolet, Visible Light, and Infrared.

- Ultraviolet: Daylight can be the strongest source of UV light and as it is invisible to the human eye, can be difficult to keep from your museum setting. "The high energy of UV radiation is particularly damaging to artifacts."
- Visible light: Visible light is, of course, necessary for museums. Visitors and staff have to be able to see the artifacts on display and without light, this would be impossible. The standards that have evolved in the museum community reflect this reality, light is necessary for the basic functions of a museum. Anything more than what is needed for basic functions can cause unnecessary damage and should be limited.
- Infrared: Infrared light can be particularly dangerous because like ultraviolet light it is invisible to the human eye, making it difficult to capture. Moreover, it causes a rise in temperature which can be harmful to many objects in organic collections. Bone, antler, horn, and ivory are susceptible to excessive heat and temperature fluctuations.

Below are recommendations for commonly acceptable light settings:

- Illumination is kept below 150 lux, with the ultraviolet (UV) component restricted to 75. Dyed objects are extremely light-sensitive and being exposed to lux levels more than 50 is damaging. Maintaining low light levels while using lights that emit less radiant heat is an effective way to prevent damage. Shining direct bright light on tightly sealed storage units can reproduce high temperatures and high RH internally, putting the stored objects at risk.

Please note that "Any level of light in excess of the minimum amount necessary to adequately view an object on exhibition causes unjustifiable damage."

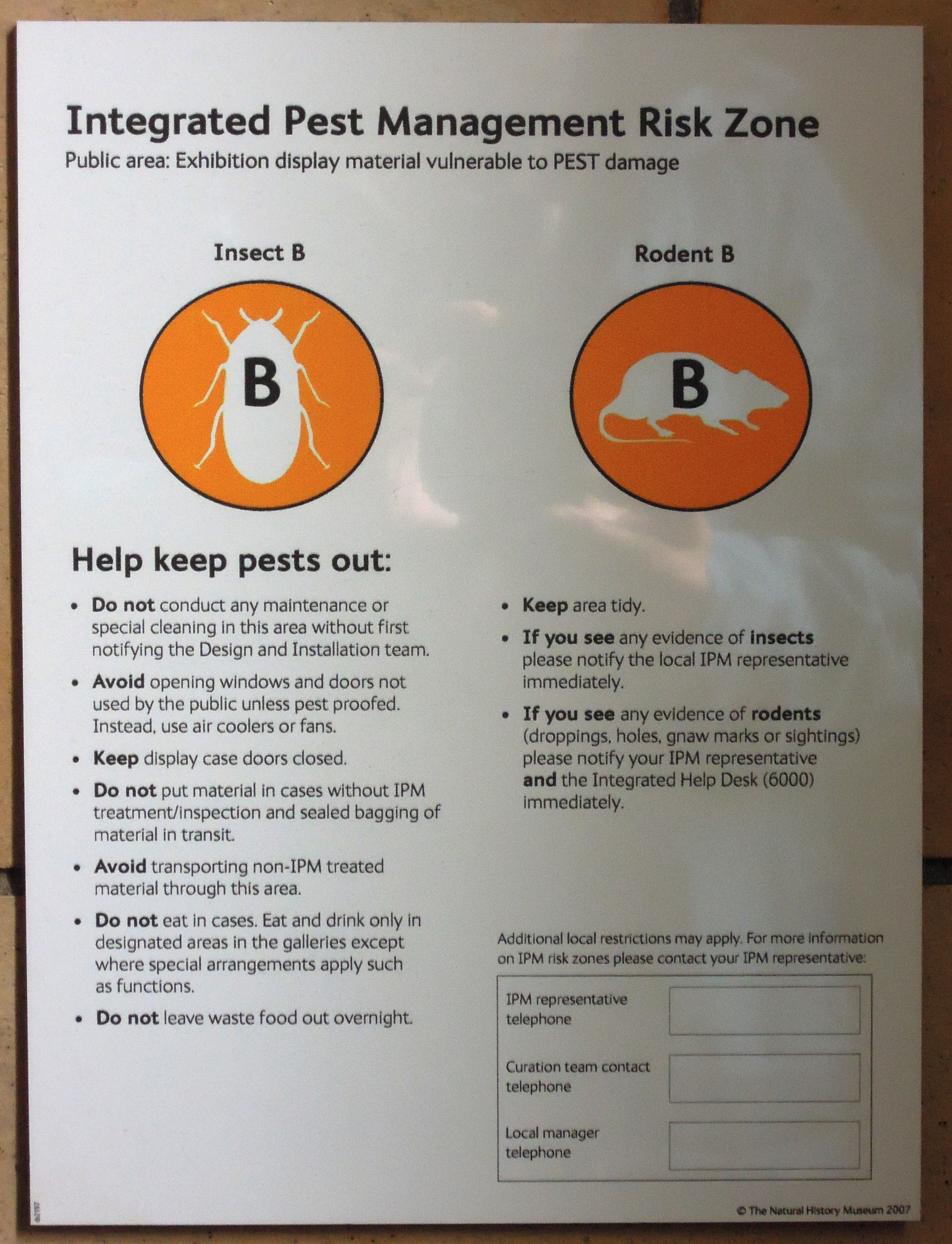
Integrated Pest Management Natural History Museum London

=== Integrated pest management ===
The term Integrated Pest Management refers to the series of pest control and prevention methods that museum staff and collections care professionals employ in their efforts to ensure the safety of their collections. Damage to collections is primarily caused by the following pests: termites, bookworms, cockroaches, silverfish, booklice, carpet beetles, clothes moths, rodents, birds, and mold, the type of pest is often dependent on the type of collection. Bone, antler, horn, and ivory are not particularly susceptible to insect damage, such as termites or booklice, so long as the objects were properly prepared before being added to the collections. However, they are vulnerable to insects and even plant growth, before proper cleaning. Pests, for example, are attracted to the fat, grease, or remaining tissues in, or on bone. Plant growth is a further concern, "Archaeological specimens are generally covered with dirt and are often penetrated by the roots of small plants," upon initial discovery. Rodents are also a consideration for organic materials. Antlers, for example, are a great source of calcium and phosphorus for rodents, they can ingest these minerals simply by gnawing on the antlers.

Preventive measures such as maintaining good housekeeping, following an integrated pest management program in storage and display areas, and employing regular pest control services will help prevent infestations.

It is recommended that you create a pest management plan that takes all of the following into consideration and work with pest management professionals to ensure the continued safety of your collections, these can include but are not limited to:

- routes of pest entry into the building
- The building's construction, and any nuances that make pest entry easier
- exhibit design and construction
- The types of pests that may be dangerous to specific collections
- types and amounts of pests found in the area, near the building
- Policies and procedures, storage practices, and general housekeeping that might easily introduce pests.

=== Display mounts ===
Preventive care can protect bone, antler, horn, and ivory objects from damaging elements, but objects on display are put at risk and therefore need to be carefully prepared as well as monitored. The adoption of protective enclosures such as exhibit cases with appropriate temperature control can aid in "Minimizing relative humidity fluctuation, as well as reducing handling, soil accumulation and infestation of microorganisms, insects, and rodents." While the use of external supports and mounts fabricated from safe materials in exhibit displays can also provide an added layer of protection for the object. Bone, antler, horn, and ivory objects can be fastened to the mounts through the application of wires or flat acrylic plastic clips. However, metals that come into direct contact with these organic objects can cause damage. The fats that may remain in these organic items react with metal, forming corrosion products that will stain the objects. For this reason, it is best to avoid placing the wires in direct contact by padding them. The use of adhesive mounts should be avoided entirely.

Rotating the bone, antler, horn, and ivory items on display, following a set timeline, prevents them from being exposed for extended periods, thus reducing the risk of extensive light damage.

== Conservation science ==
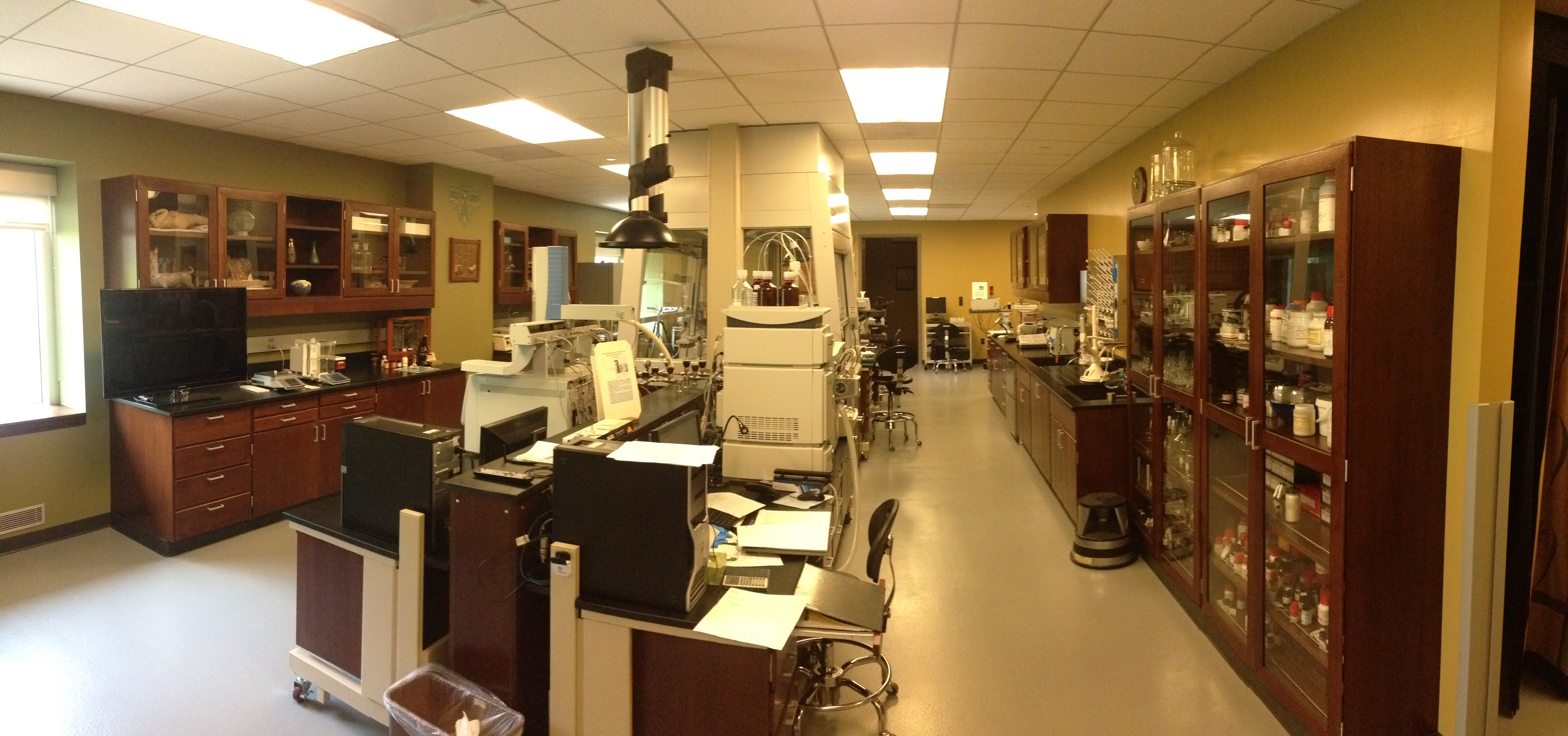
IMA Conservation Science Lab

Conservation science is a varied and complex field with aspects devoted to the study of objects’ materials, uses and origins, how they degrade over time, and techniques for care, storage, and display. Antler, bone, and horn have been heavily used for tools and other objects for at least 1.5 million years, and continue to be used today, though modern materials such as plastic and metal are now predominant. Bone, antler, and horn create relatively durable items; long bones (femurs, phalanges, etc.) and antlers provide the most versatile working material for many tools, but all parts of a skeleton can be worked. Horn has numerous applications, from medieval hornbooks to 19th-century hair ornaments and more.

Examining signs of modifications to bones can offer conservation scientists information about age, usage, creative techniques, and previous attempts at conservation. Critically, conservation science allows scientists to determine if bone, antler, and horn remains were worked by humans or simply altered by the environment, which in turn leads to new discoveries of tool usage, particularly in early humans. To date, some of the earliest tool usages have been discovered through the analysis of wear patterns on bone. This is known as use-wear analysis, in which objects are microscopically examined for their wear patterns and striations. Such analysis determines if an object is a tool or was worked by humans and can also determine what an object was used for. Bone and antler tools, for example, will begin to polish over time with repeated use. By examining the worn, polished areas, scientists may determine how a bone or antler tool was held and used.

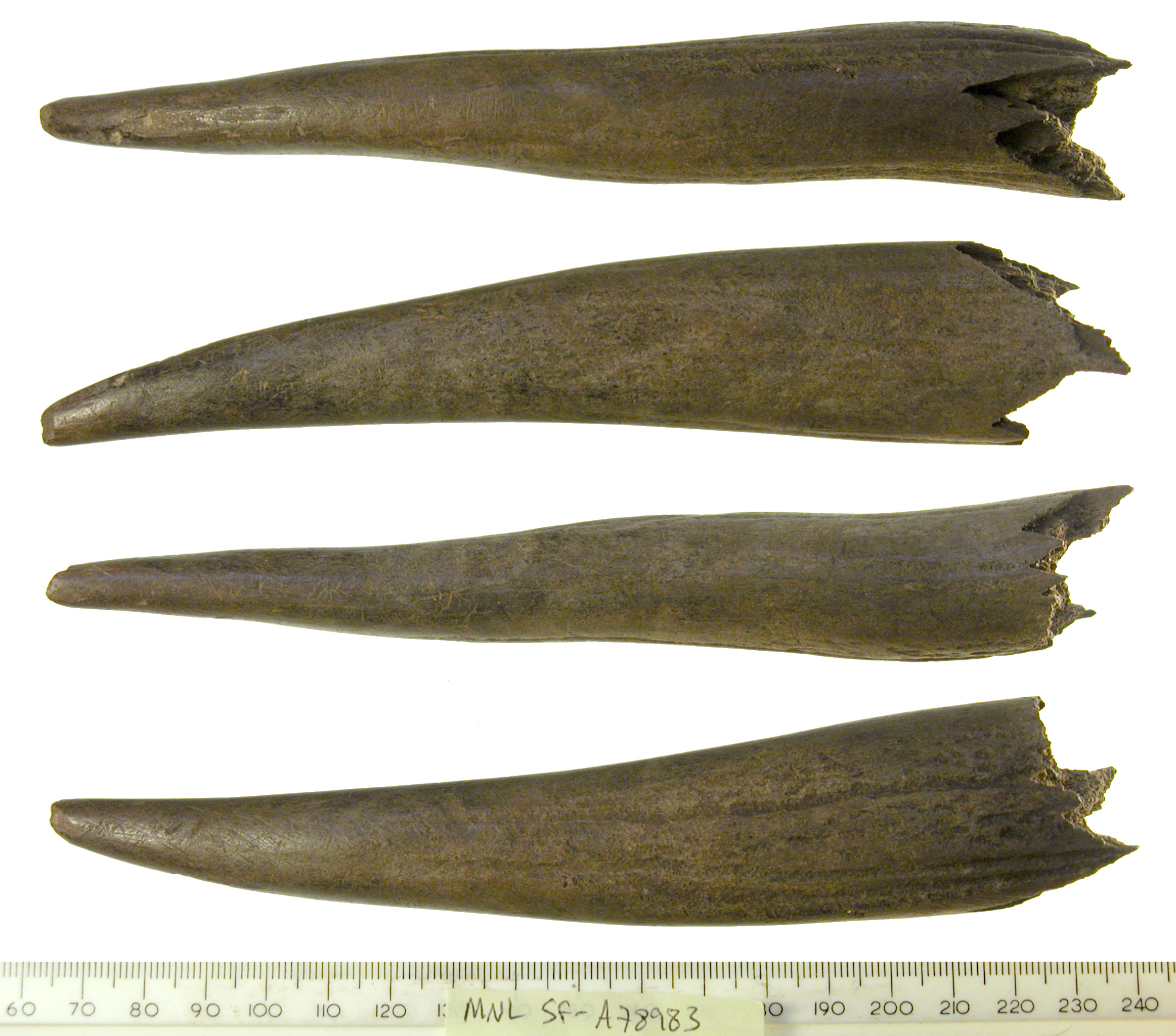
Worked antler

In addition to determining what an object is and how it was likely used, conservation scientists attempt to determine the object's likely age. In the past, this was done with relative dating, in which the surrounding area of an object's discovery was examined, and the geologic stratigraphy used to settle upon the most likely age range. As this method was less than exact, contemporary scientists prefer absolute dating, such as radiocarbon dating. Radiocarbon dating, also known as carbon dating, determines an object's age by isolating and measuring the level of radioactive carbon-14, as living things absorb and accumulate carbon naturally over their lifetime. Once an organism dies, carbon levels begin to drop and carbon-14, being an unstable isotope, slowly decays to carbon-12. Based on how much of the carbon-14 isotope remains in the object, scientists are able to determine an objective age. As bone, antler and horn are all derived from living organisms, determining the level of carbon-14 versus carbon-12 is considered quite effective and is the most widely used form of absolute dating.

== Treatment ==
Treatment is the intentional application of a restoration process to an object in need of care by a conservation professional. Reasons for treatments can vary, whether to repair significant damage, to stabilize an object in poor condition, or to prepare an object for exhibition. Whatever the reason "Restorations—indeed all treatments—are cumulative. The preservation of objects in perpetuity implies that they will undergo treatments in the future as many have already in the past. Thus there is an ethical imperative for minimizing treatment since subsequent intrusion moves the object farther from its original state." This can be especially true of bone, antler, and horn, objects, already removed from their original environments. Bone, horn, and antler objects are often part of museum collections and are unique because they require special considerations in terms of care. For example, bone, being an organic material, if placed under the right conditions will eventually break down whether in nature or in the collections. causing treatment to be necessary.

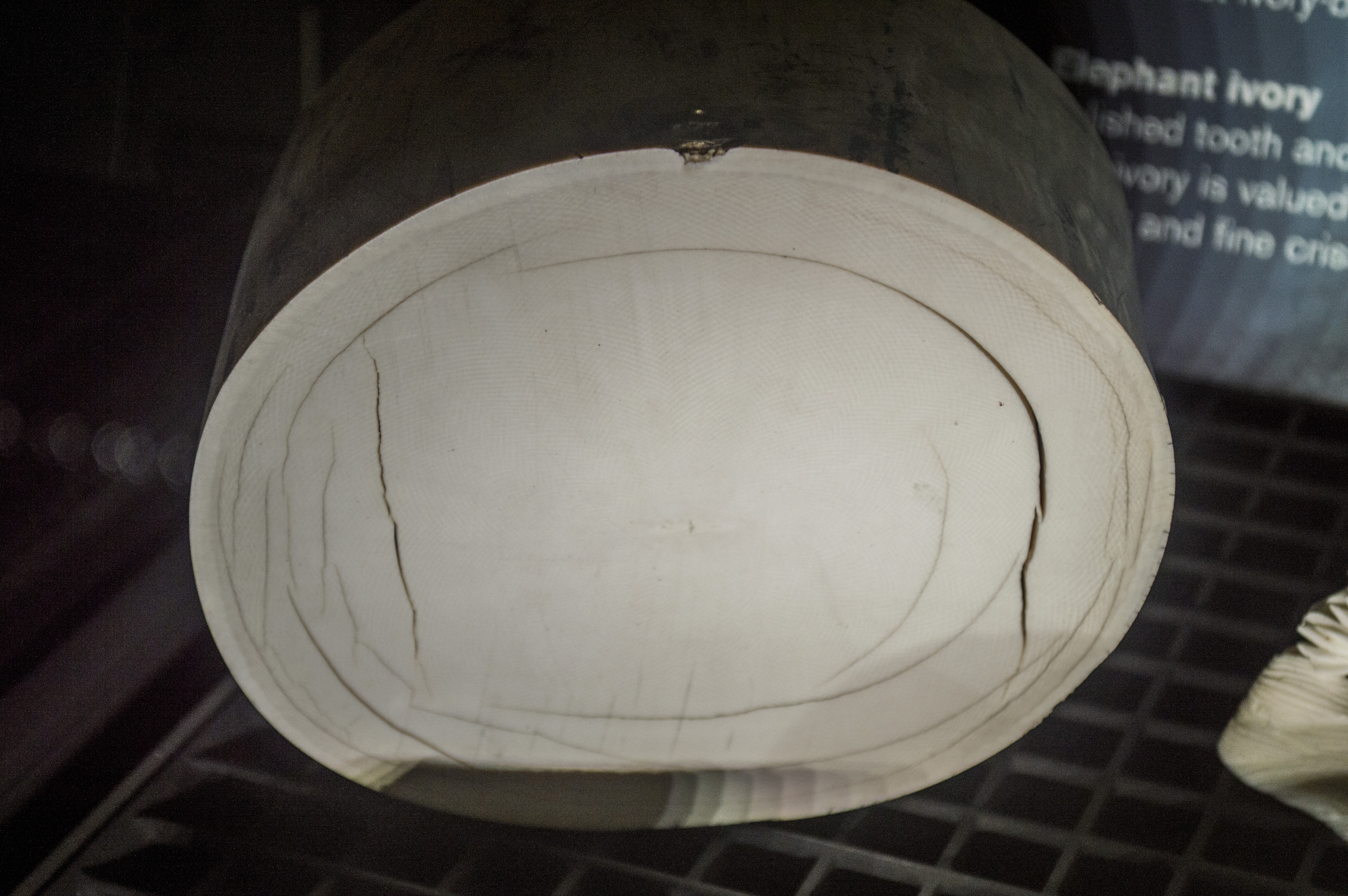
Cross section of ivory tusk. Exemplar in Victoria and Albert museum, London.

=== Determining material ===
Treatment methods may differ for each material, ivory for example is more dense than bone and may crack or delaminate while drying. Determining the type of material is necessary to determine the course of treatment. Before treating an object a condition assessment is completed to ascertain what condition the object is in before deciding whether treatment is necessary and if so what course of action is best. The relative condition of bone can be tested in many cases, by compressing the surface of the material. "One good indication of condition is the hardness of the surface... If it compresses or feels spongy, the material has deteriorated."

Different objects, whether organic, composite, or inorganic, have different needs. Treatment methods should be a reflection of those needs and carried out accordingly.

=== Stabilization, repair, and restoration ===
Once the condition of the object and what the issues facing the object have been determined a course of treatment is decided upon. "Any conservation activity should, therefore, follow sufficient research in order to identify the needs of the objects and safeguard their values and functions." In other words, different objects have different needs and treatment methods should be carried out accordingly. For example, consolidation is a treatment method that can strengthen an object that is weakened, but it can also interfere with chemical analysis. Stains might be able to be removed but the process could damage the bone if it is not done carefully. Conservators must choose between varying methods of treatment. Should they allow the object to crack rather than apply the consolidant and simply stabilize the object as much as possible? Or complete the treatment, restoring the object to its original condition?

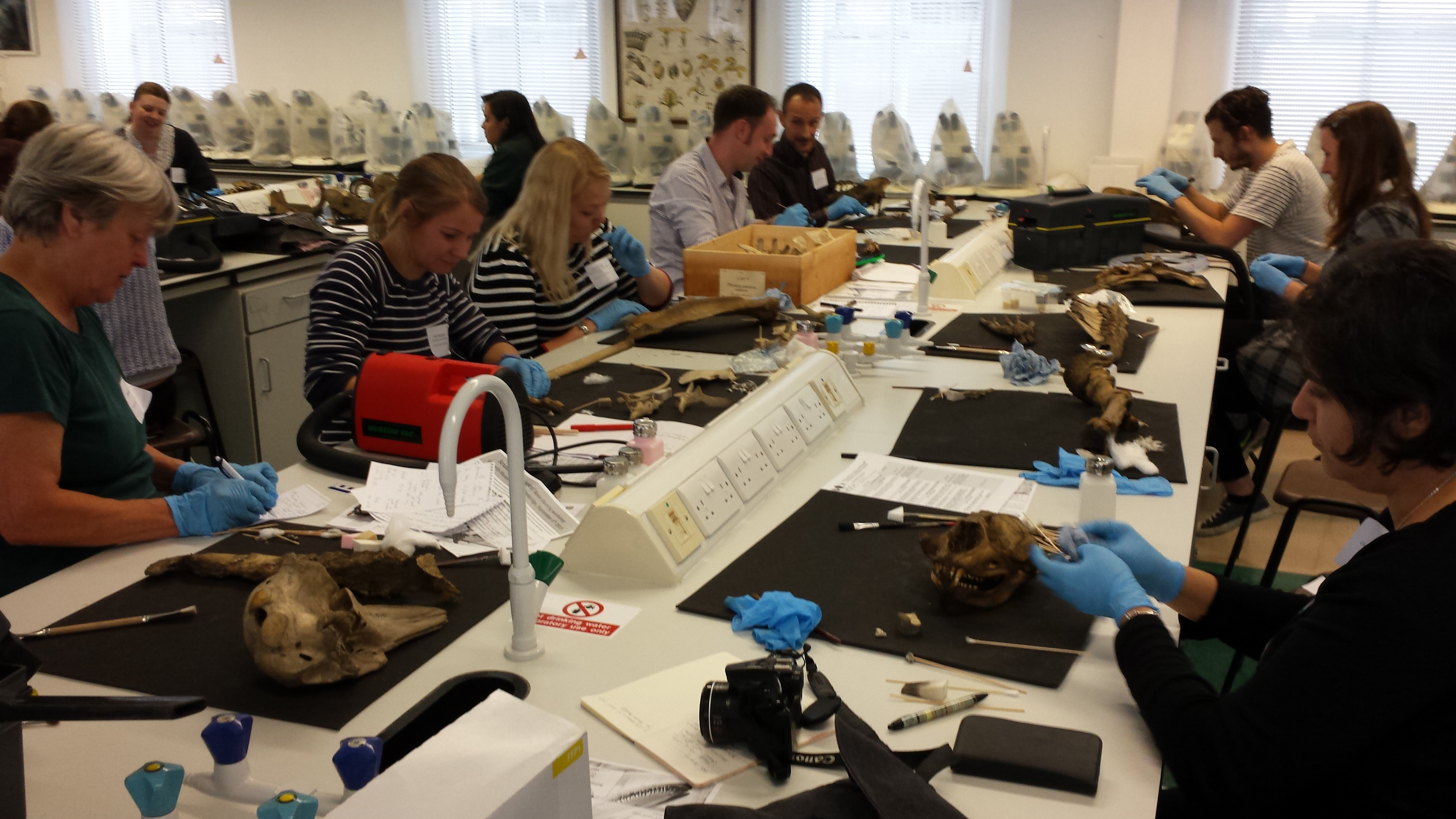
Bone cleaning in progress

=== Treating bone, horn, and antler objects ===
Cleaning: Provided that objects are in good condition, normal surface dirt and grime may be safely removed in a variety of ways. This includes using a soft brush to lightly dust the object and dislodge dust and debris. To remove forest debris, and ingrown plants you can use tools such as tweezers to carefully remove the pieces and dust off the dirt by hand.

Consolidation: Consolidants are a material that can be applied to lend strength to an object that is weakened. These must be applied carefully and removal of any stains or other harmful substances must be done first. "Consolidants may be water- or solvent-based."

- Removal of surface dirt: when minimal dusting and maintenance are not successful in removing surface dust, a conservator may perform more intensive cleaning, using water and a safe cleaner.
- Removal of soluble salts: organic materials from a salty environment will invariably absorb soluble salts that will crystallize as the object dries. Salt crystallization will cause surface flaking and may result in irreversible damage. Conservators will remove the soluble salt to make the object stable by using water with certain levels of chloride and ionization, only if the object is structurally sound.
- Removal of insoluble salts and stains: to remove insoluble salts and stains, conservators either use a mechanical method with picks and other tools or chemical treatment.

Drying: This is a method that can be applied to material that is in fair to excellent condition. Air-drying is the simplest method but must be conducted carefully and monitored well, as bone, horn, antler, and ivory objects are each susceptible to fluctuations in temperature and humidity and liable to crack. Air drying is the simplest method, and should be slow and controlled as the risks include swelling, cracking, and delamination. Objects should be kept out of direct sunlight, away from heat sources, and in cool temperatures with low humidity levels while being dried.

Dusting: A variable speed vacuum, soft, lint-free cloths, vinyl eraser crumbs, vulcanized rubber sponges, and micro-attachments may be used to remove surface dust. When dusting it is important to remember to apply as little pressure as necessary. Dust can be difficult to remove without disrupting the structure of some objects, particles of debris may scratch the surface of the object. This is why it is important to frequently change to a clean cloth. When vacuuming remember to avoid contact between the object, the vacuum cleaner, and its attachments. Carefully clean attachments between each use to avoid getting dust and dirt from one object to another.

Bug Box: Dermestid beetle larvae are a common pest in museum collections. They feed on a wide variety of material—particularly bird and mammal skins as well as textiles and leather. Several species of Dermestes, also known as skin beetles, feed on flesh. These beetles and their larvae can be used to your advantage. They are very effective bone cleaners. After drying out the intended specimen simply create a "bug box", this can be any container large enough to house both the bones being cleaned and the dermestids doing the job. "Open-top containers should be tightly covered with a screen or other material to prevent the beetles from escaping."

Degreasing: Bones contain fat, this fat can be removed using various kinds of solvents. and help mitigate pest issues as well as keeping your bones in good shape. Options include water-based treatments, either soaking the bone in repeated baths or simmering them in heated water, never boiling. Bones can also be immersed in ammonia to degrease them should fat remain. However, one should never use detergents or other chemically based solvents as they "may contain colorants, perfumes, and other additives." that could damage the objects.

=== Harmful conservation treatments ===
When addressing minor repairs and minimal cleaning of objects containing bone, antler, or horn, there are some methods/products that are avoided.

- Liquid-based cleaners or detergents used to clean surface dirt and dust can damage the objects.
- Over-the-counter adhesives used to repair cracks and breaks can stain and become brittle over time. Cracks and breaks in these organic materials can be indicators and evidence of an object's use and history, and therefore should not be addressed unless the health of the object is in danger.
- Wax or other protective coating used to make repairs can obscure surface details, cause discoloring of the surface, and are often impossible to remove without causing further damage.

Always consult a conservator before progressing with treatment.

=== Documentation ===
Documentation is a key piece of treatment as it alerts future conservators to potential interactions between new and old treatments. This is especially important because no treatment is truly reversible. Documenting each progressive treatment that conservators and collections staff submit an object to can help to prevent any possible interactions, negative or otherwise, between these materials during testing. or future treatments.

According to the ICOM Code of Ethics, "Museum collections should be documented according to accepted professional standards. Such documentation should include a full identification and description of each item, its associations, provenance, condition, treatment, and present location. Such data should be kept in a secure environment and be supported by retrieval systems providing access to the information by the museum personnel and other legitimate users."

== Case studies ==
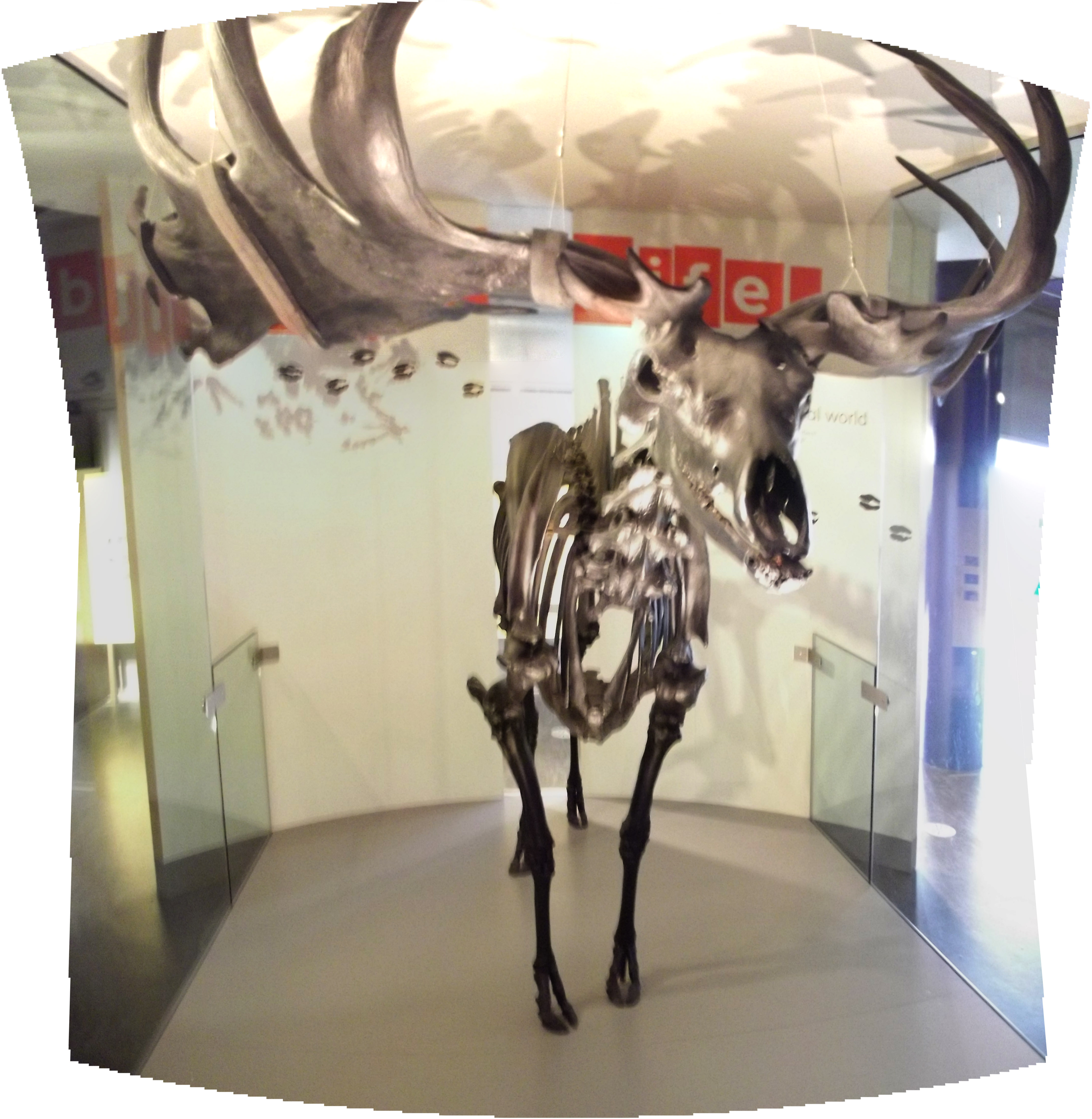
Wildlife - Thinktank Birmingham Science Museum - A Giant Deer

=== Conservation of a 19th Century Giant Deer ===
In 2016, conservators from the National Museum of Ireland assisted the University College Dublin Library in a conservation-restoration effort after a mishap that caused damage to the deer skull, antlers, and other skeletal elements. In addition to the immediate damage, the conservators probed the skeleton for other damage, previous repair work, any other ongoing deterioration. This case study is an overview of the steps taken in the conservation-restoration.

==== Investigation ====
When it comes to skeletal remains, they are rarely found as a complete skeleton. It is common to use bones from many individuals to create a single mounted skeleton. An anatomical assessment was made to identify and discover any missing/incorrect elements and to ensure the giant deer was anatomically correct when finished.

Environmental conditions were identified and monitored to see if those had contributed to the deterioration.

Portions of previous restoration efforts were deteriorating. Further investigation revealed a newspaper scrap used to fill the cavities around the iron rods dated 1864, giving an approximate date the deer was mounted. The intent is to leave anything structurally sound untouched to retain as much of the historic mount as possible and minimize further damage.

==== Ethical considerations ====
Considerations of "conservation ethical concerns, client expectations, future structural stability and the limitations of the future display location" must be completed before the intensive treatment is started.

==== Treatment decisions ====
The bones were cleaned of dirt. Anything that appeared stable was left alone. Areas with visual plaster in fractured areas was removed with dental tools and tweezers, and incorrect paint color was removed. Radiological (X-ray) imagery was used to discover if rods were continuous through the long leg bones or if the splits along the bones were stress fractures caused by the weight of the skeleton instead of fluctuations in temperature and relative humidity causing the bones to expand and contract to breaking. The antlers were permanently attached to the skull due to their condition and display location, whereas reversible measures that would be used under different circumstances would not work here.

==== Materials and tools ====
Microballoon spheres and Paraloid B72 were used as gap filler and in the structural remodeling due to their high bulking ability while reducing the contact surface area (and further damage) to the bones, long-term stability, and easy removal. Using the same technique throughout the restoration "limit[s] the number of different substances introduced to the specimen and enable[s] treatment to be identified as a single phase of conservation in the future." Japanese tissue was used as a barrier between the bone and the microballoon filler to increase the ease of removability in the future if needed. Copper plated mild steel welding rods, riflers, files, and wood carving chisels were used to shape skeletal element remodels, then painted using an in-paint containing earth pigments in a Paraloid B72, IMS, and acetone solution. This solution allows for quick identification under an ultraviolet light between the shellac-covered bone and microballoon remodel. The antlers were attached with high tension CFRP carbon fiber rods, then hidden with modeling epoxy and in-paint and given additional support on display via heavy duty fishing line looped around the antlers and ceiling trusses.

==== Future care and recommendations ====
The temperature and relative humidity were monitored for four months. The fluctuations indicate further damage to the bones will occur if nothing preventative is done. Currently, the giant deer skeleton's exhibition can be no longer than six months at a time. Research is being conducted for a suitable display case with climate control so the deer may be on permanent display.
