= Bovine anatomy =

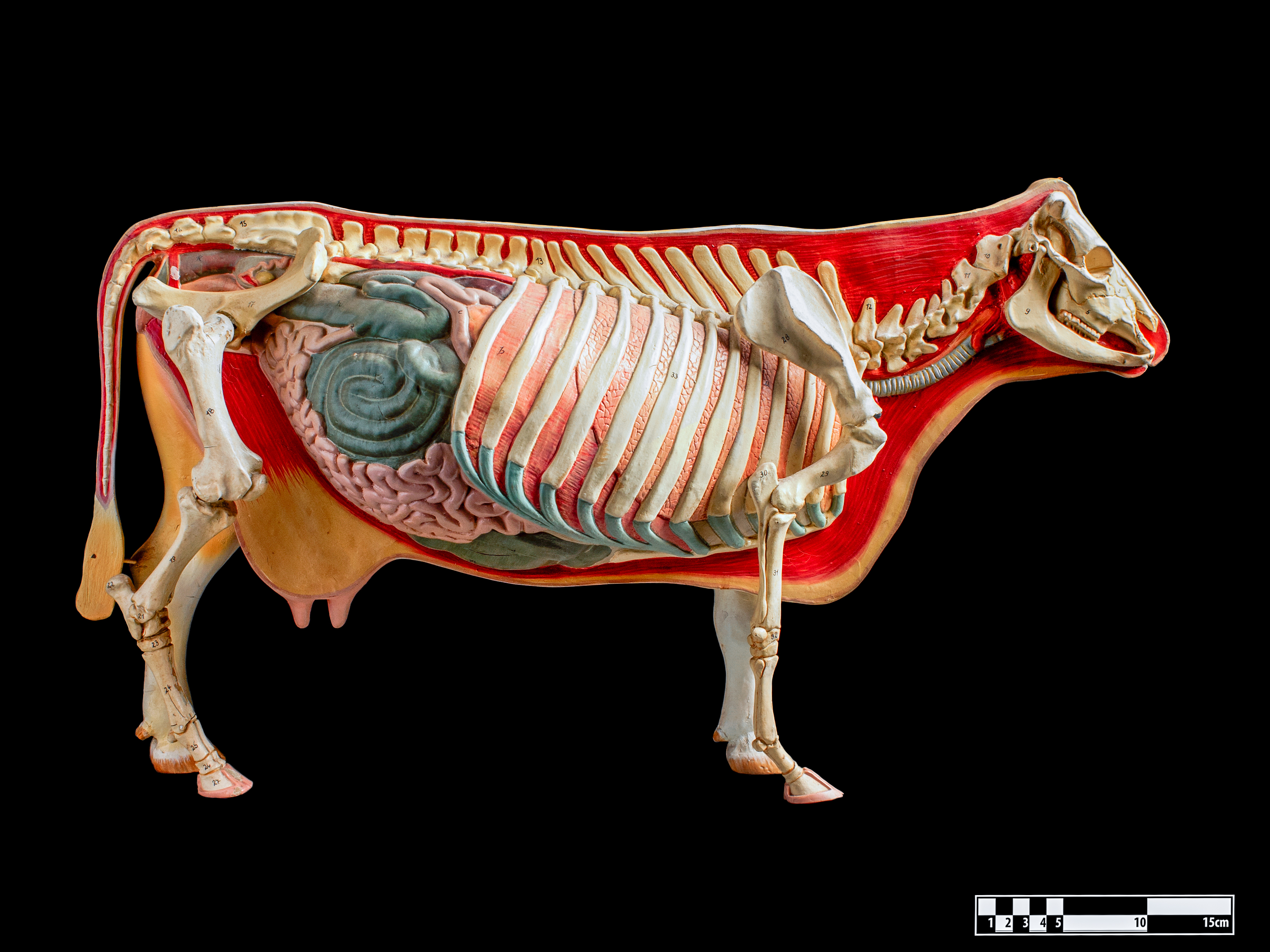
Model of a cow's internal anatomy

Bovine anatomy is the study of gross and microscopic anatomical structures in members of Bovidae, which include cattle, goats, bison, and antelopes. Being mammals, bovids are warm-blooded and have fur, and are placental mammals (as opposed to marsupials or monotremes). Bovids are also ruminants, and except for some polled domestic breeds, all male bovids have keratin-coated horns. Many female bovids have horns as well.

Bovids vary greatly in size, weight, color, and horn shape. The smallest wild bovid is the royal antelope, which stands at 25 cm (10 in) and has an average weight of 2 kg (4.4 lb). The largest is the gaur, which stands at 1.8 m (6 feet) and can weigh over 900 kg (1984.2 lb). The selective breeding of domestic cattle has led to especially great variations within that species. The smallest cattle breed is the Vechur, which reaches a maximum size of 83-105 cm (32-41 in) and maximum weight of 130-200 kg (286-440 lb), while the largest, the Chianina, can reach a height of 2 meters (6.6 feet) and weight of 1,600 kg (35,723 lb), or 1.6 tonnes. There is more disparity among the bovids than among other ruminants.

== External anatomy ==
=== Hides ===
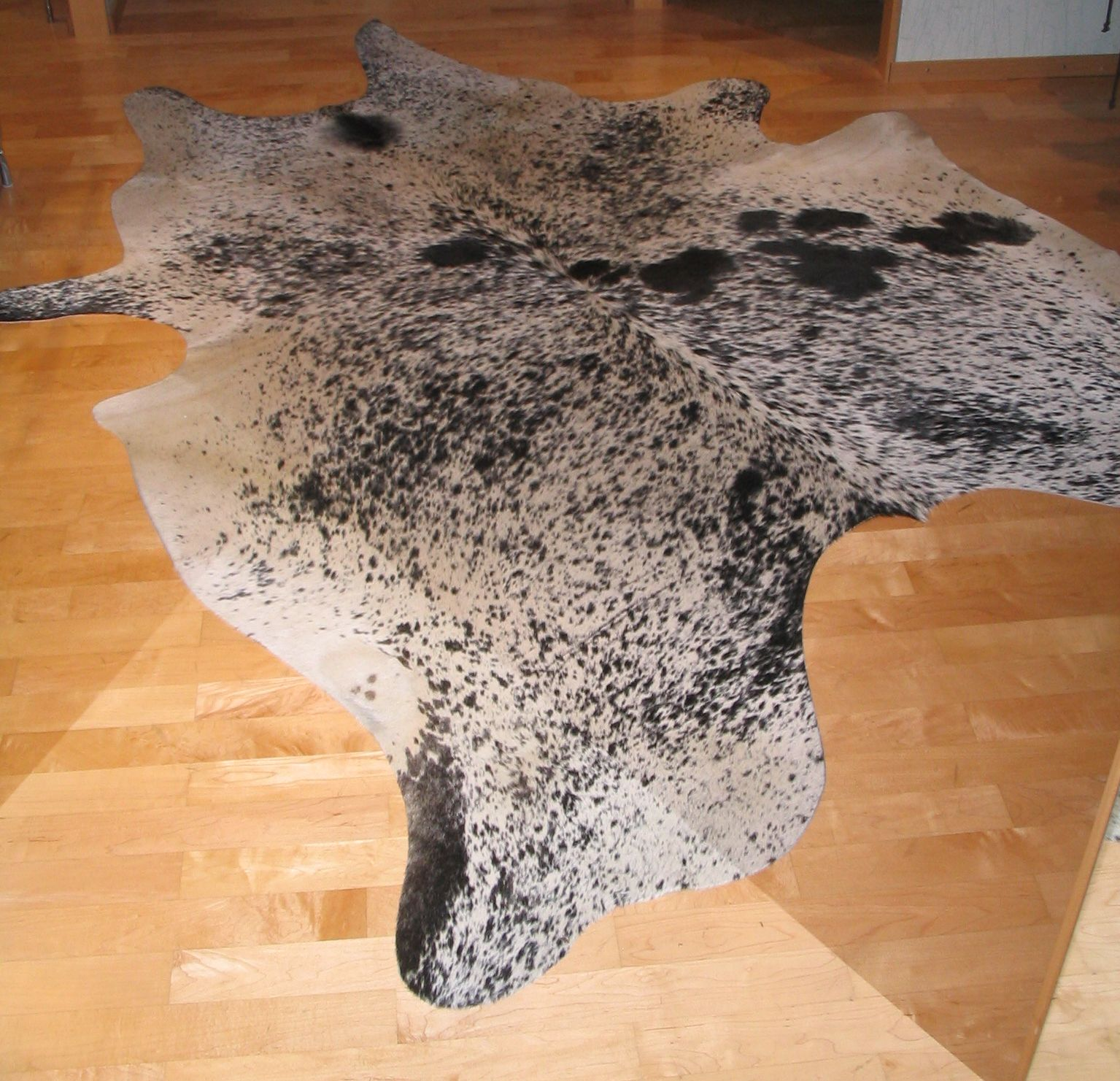
A cow's hide on the floor of a furrier's shop

Bovids come in a wide array of colours. Some utilize camouflage, such as the stripes on the bongo and kudu. Some bovids have unique markings, which individuals can use to tell their herdmates apart. Black cattle are more prone to heat stress than cattle with lighter colours, such as white or red, though colour does not seem to affect the respiration rate. Colour also affects growth, with white cattle growing faster than dark red cattle. Males are often darker than females.

=== Horns ===
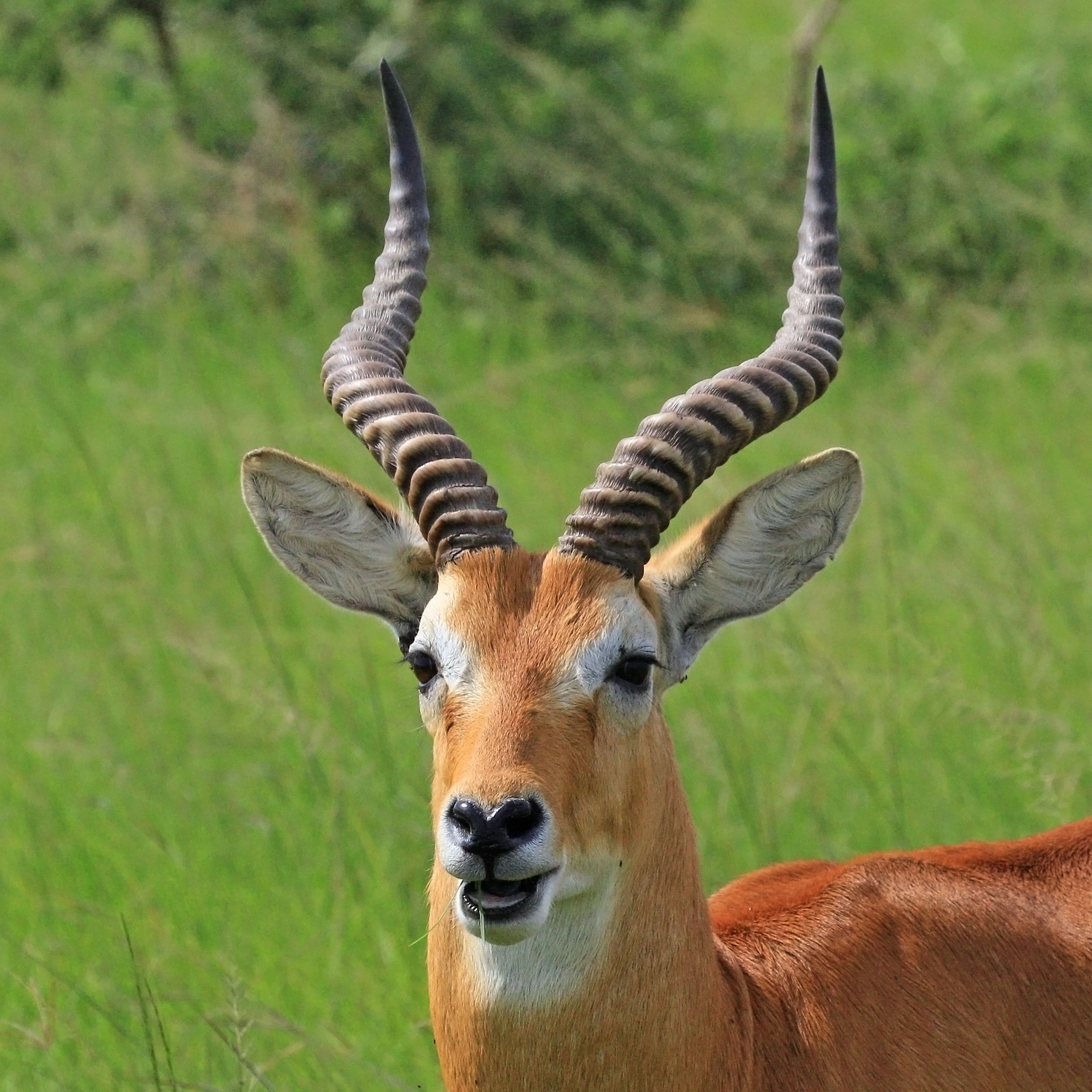
A male Ugandan kob, with long, spiral horns

Bovids have horns, which differ from antlers in that they are permanently attached to the skull, and their bony core is coated in keratin, while antlers shed every year and have no such coating. Horns grow throughout the bovid's life. Bovids in temperate climates have smaller bone cores and thicker keratin coatings than those in tropical climates, reducing surface area and allowing the temperate bovids to retain more heat. Temperate bovid horns also tend to be prostrate or curled in position, again reducing the surface area and thus retaining more heat.

Horn shape is also affected by fighting behaviors. Recurved horns are adapted for ramming behavior, horns with short reaches for stabbing, and horns with longer reaches for fencing. Some bovids, like the common eland, have spirals on their horns, which helps with attaining a grip and deflecting fractures while wresting. Generally, the more likely a species is to engage in fights, the longer its horns will be.

Male bovids always have horns, and these horns are thicker and more complex horns than females. A male's horn size is positively correlated with the size of his herd, likely due to the higher chance of sexual selection. Territoriality, in contrast, is negatively correlated to horn size, likely because territorial males have less access to females. A trade-off to large horns is heat loss; it has been argued that heat loss is a major countering force against sexual selection of horn size. When female bovids have horns, it is usually in species that are large in size or which live in open habitats. Thus, the female cannot hide as well as a less visible species. Females of small but territorial species, like duikers, are an exception to this rule.Female horn length is thought to be controlled by natural, rather than sexual, selection, as it is unaffected by mating system factors, and because the horns of female caprids (a subfamily of Bovidae) seem more affected by temperature.

=== Hooves ===
Bovids have cloven hooves, which means that the hoof is split into two digits, held together by the cruciate ligament. Each digit has 3 phalanx bones, a navicular bone, and 2 sesamoid bones, so that each hoof has a total of 6 bones.

The bovine hoof has a hard outer coating called a hoof wall, which is made of keratin. The hoof wall has a layered structure, making the hoof resistant to wear and protecting the animal from impact force when running. Below the wall is the corium, comparable to the dermis in humans, which consists of nerves and blood vessels. In some species, like yak, the tissue is also rich in adipose. The bottom of the external hoof is the sole, which is softer and more flexible than the hoof wall.

== Skeletal system ==
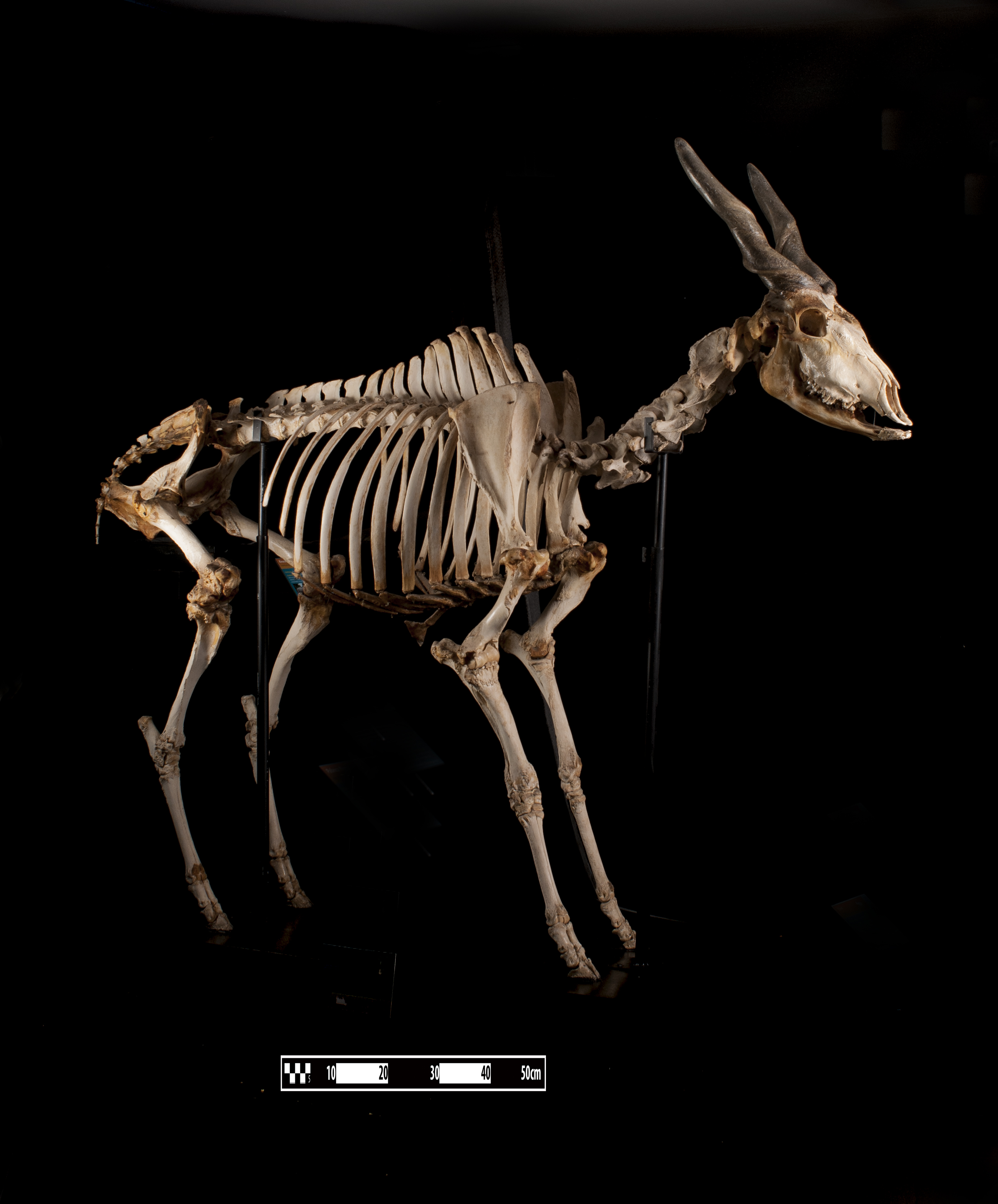
Skeleton of a common eland

As vertebrates, bovids have a spinal column. There are always 6 lumbar vertebrae and 7 cervical vertebrae, though the size of the latter varies with species. The thoracic vertebrae, which connects the lumbar and cervical segments, may consist of 14 or 15 vertebrae. Humped species and breeds have long neural spines on their thoracic vertebrae; in some, like the gaur, the hump is formed solely from these spines.

The long bones of the limbs (the stylopod and zeugopod) are affected by the animal's habitat. For example, bovids in grassland habitats have wider humeri to allow for galloping (and have more body mass overall), while bovids in forest and mountain habitats have rounder femoral heads, allowing for more flexible hip movements in these tighter environments. Limb long bones in heavier species are also more robust, so as to support the animal's heavy weight.

Domestic breeds have had their skeletal systems affected by selected breeding. Most domestic cattle have robust bones similar to the largest wild species, as they are bred for meat. An exception is the Limousin, which has a fine skeleton, and thus its carcass has a higher muscle to bone ratio compared to other breeds.

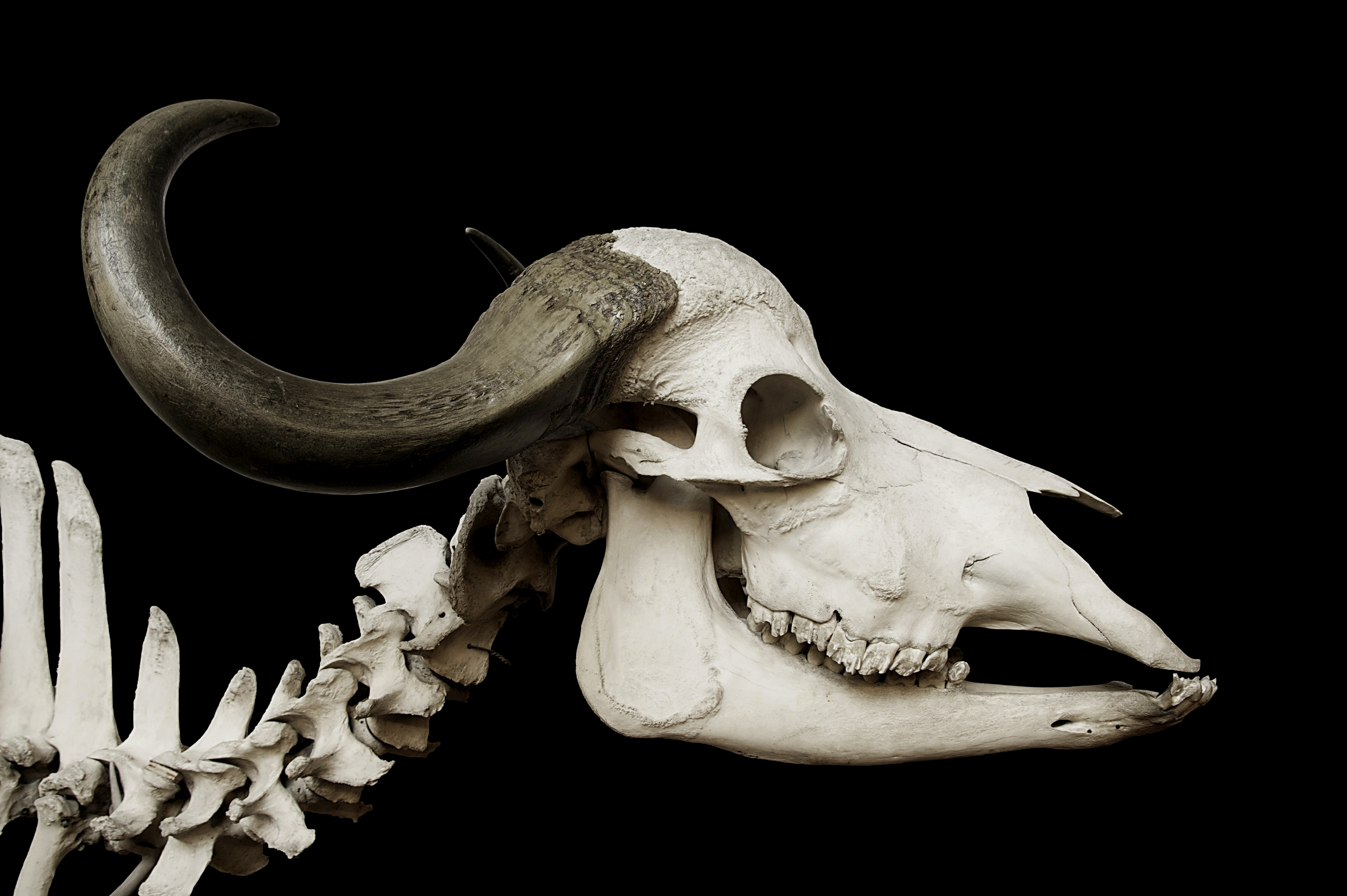
Skull of an African buffalo. Unlike with antlers, a bovid's horns are permanently attached to its skull.

=== Skull ===
There is a much wider disparity between bovine skulls than there is between other ruminants, such as cervids. Snout width is tied to diet and the aridity of the animal's habitat. Grazing bovids have wide skulls for gathering large amounts of grass, with grazers living in humid climates having wider snouts than those in arid ones. This may be tied to grazers in arid climates having to be more selective in feeding. Conversely, the skulls of browsers and mixed feeders have more narrow snouts, as these animals are always more selective, and their snout size is more consistent across climates. Additionally, bovids in the tribe bovini are distinguished by wide, low skulls with short braincases.
