= Animal weapon =

Traits of an animal species, used to fight others for access to resources

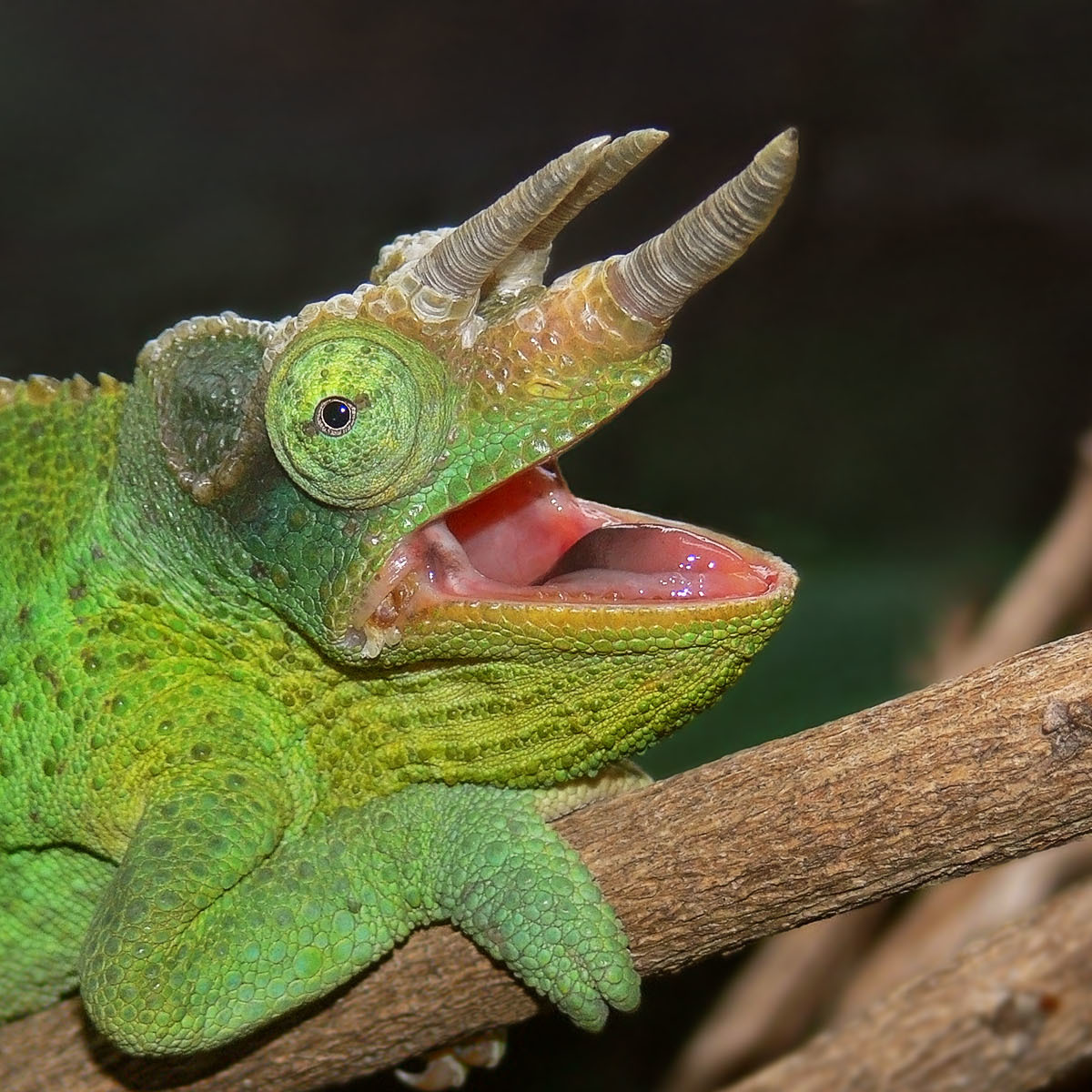
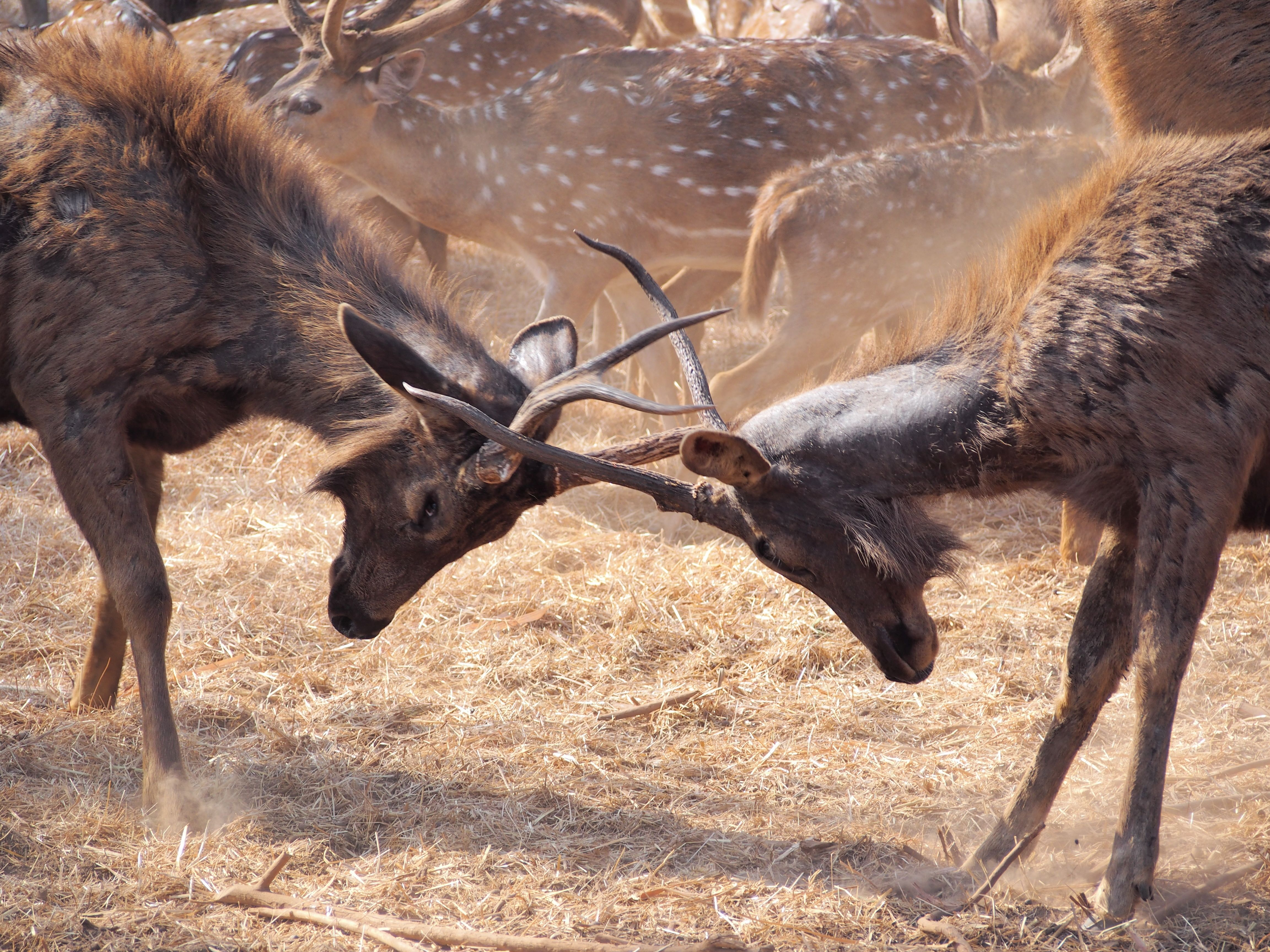
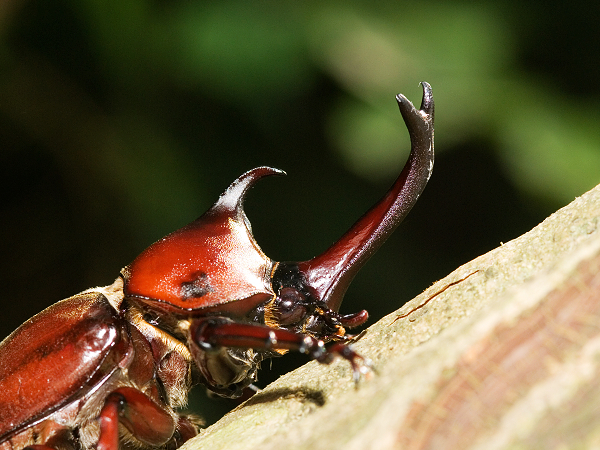
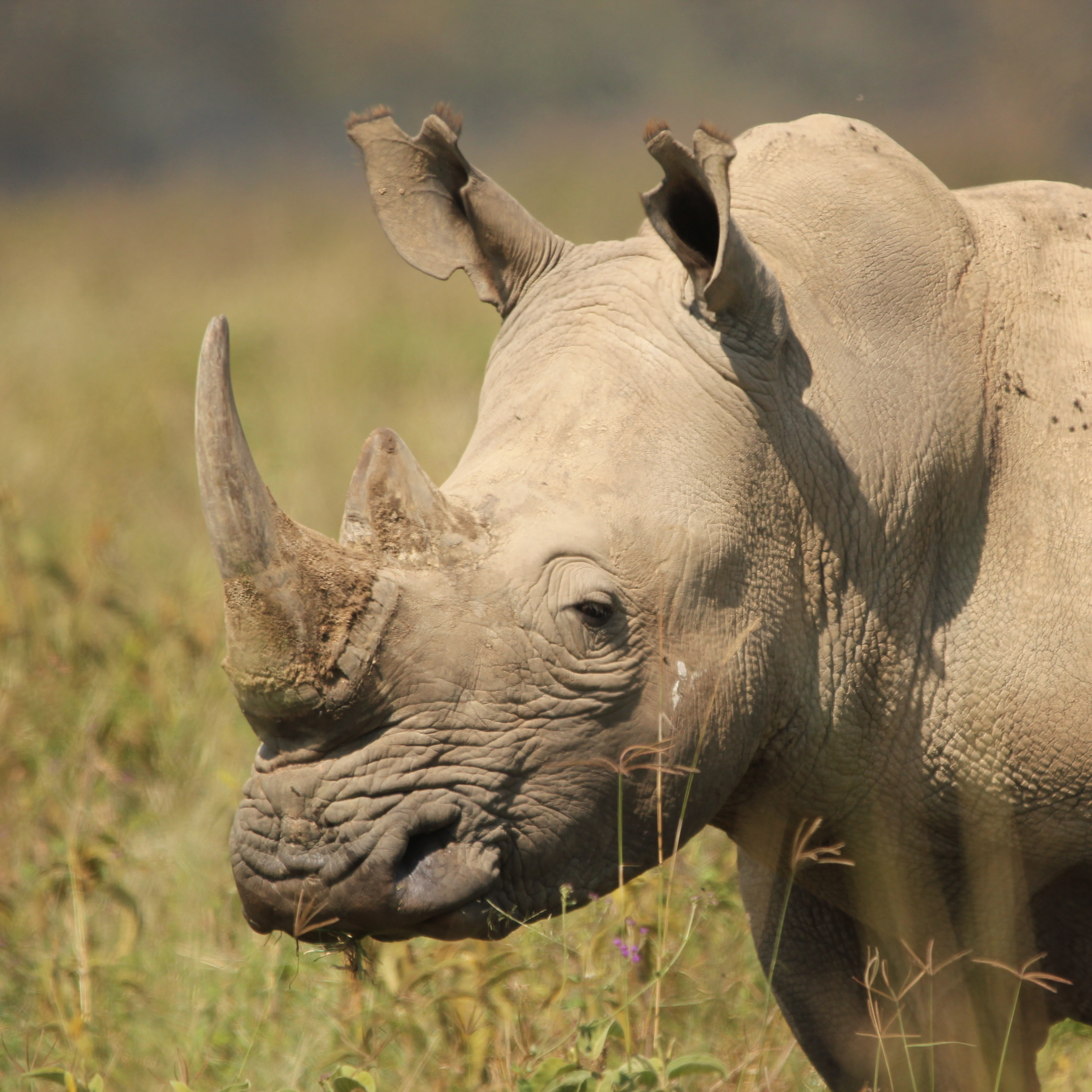
Top left: Jackson's chameleon with three forward facing face horns
Top right: Sambar deer bucking with their horns
Lower left: rhinoceros beetle with giant horns (Trypoxylus dichotomus)
Lower right: White rhinoceros with tandem nose horns

In biology, a weapon is a specialized physical trait that is used by animals to compete with other individuals for resources. Most commonly, the term refers to structures that males use to fight other males off for access to mates. They can also be used to defend resources in intraspecific competition, or to ward off predators. Examples of weapons include horns and antlers, both among the most recognizable weapons, though even within those categories, the structure of the specific weaponry is often unique to the species, with a wide variety of designs observed across many genera.

Many weapons evolve through sexual selection, as they are most often used to fight off competitors for access to mates. A mate is won in battle either by a male chasing off a fellow competitor or killing it, usually leaving the victor as the only option for the female to reproduce with, favoring males with particularly effective weaponry. More broadly, weaponry in animals may consist of any specialized morphology that is present within an organism to aid in its advantage against rivals. Many hypotheses have been produced by researchers to possibly explain the mechanisms behind the evolution of weapons, with studies detailing the intensity, duration, and conclusion of intraspecific combat, as well as analyzing the rapid diversification within species.

Since Darwin's publication The Descent of Man, extensive research has been done on the presence of agonistic behavior and the usage of animal weaponry by different species. Weaponry displays in animals have been found to increase their likelihood of survival in different ways, such as when interacting with other individuals or trying to find another mate, or to defend against predators.

== Occurrence ==
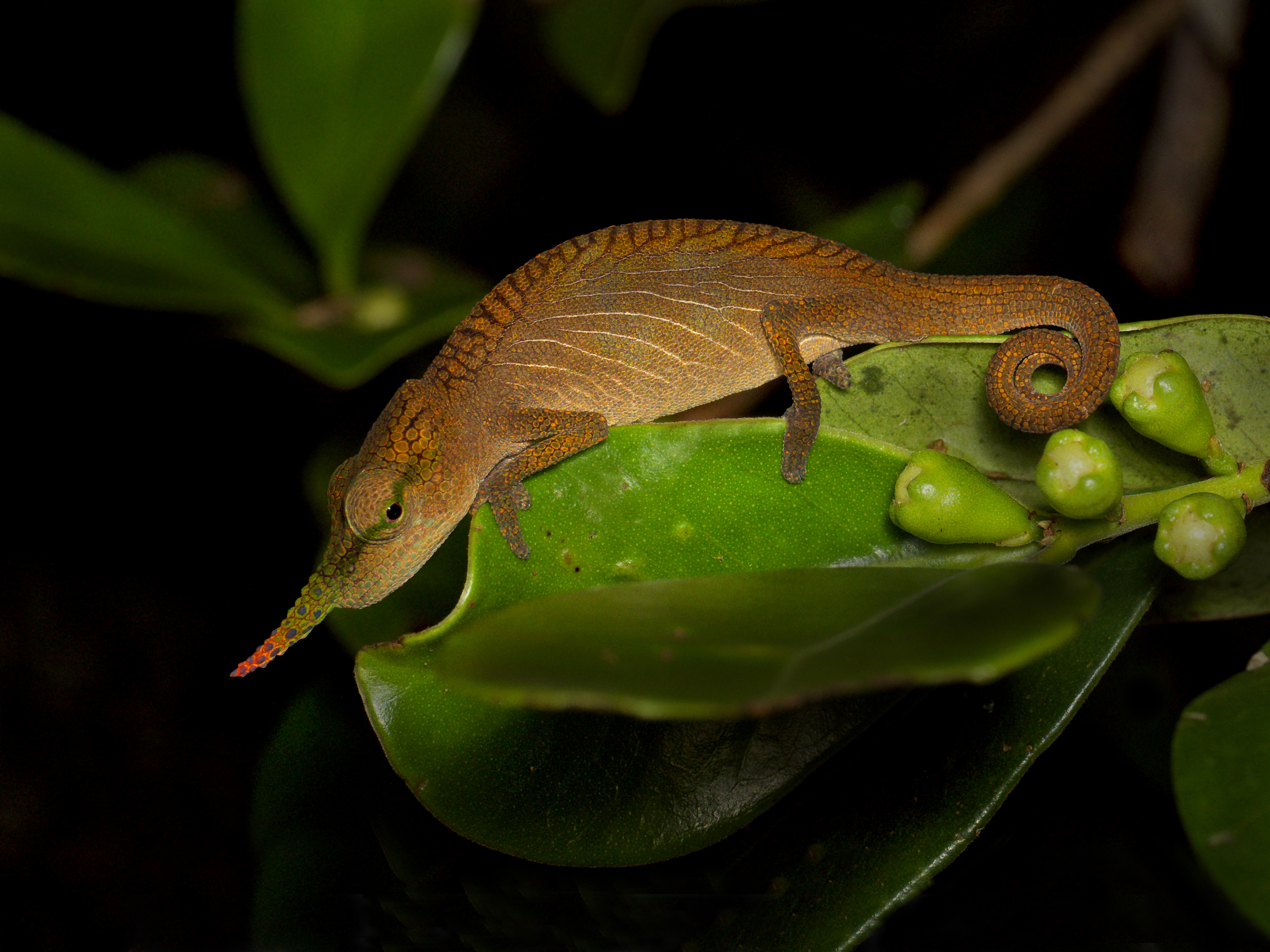
The horn-like projections of a chameleon are used to fight other males on tree trunks

Weapons are common among many genera of animals. Among vertebrates, they are most often found in mammals and fish, and are also known to occur in reptiles, though far less commonly in that class. Many species of dinosaur, an extinct clade of vertebrates, also possessed weapons. Arthropods, such as arachnids and crabs, also have species that wield weapons, and they are extraordinarily widespread among insects.

In mammals, weapons are common and take a number of diverse forms. They are most common among the ungulates. Antlers, complex and unique weapons that are an extension of an animal's skull, are found among male deers, as well as female reindeers, ungulates who are even-toed ruminants. Horns, permanent pointed projections consisting of a covering of keratin and other proteins surrounding a core of live bone, are found commonly among bovids, as well as the pronghorns, which are ruminant artiodactyls. Rhinoceroses are odd-toed ungulates which have horns made of keratin; both sexes use these horns in contests with other individuals of the same species. Walruses and elephants, non-ungulates, both possess elongated tusks. Apart from mammals, the only other group of land vertebrates that shows widespread adoption of weapons are the chameleons, who possess horn-like structures for fighting over access to mates.

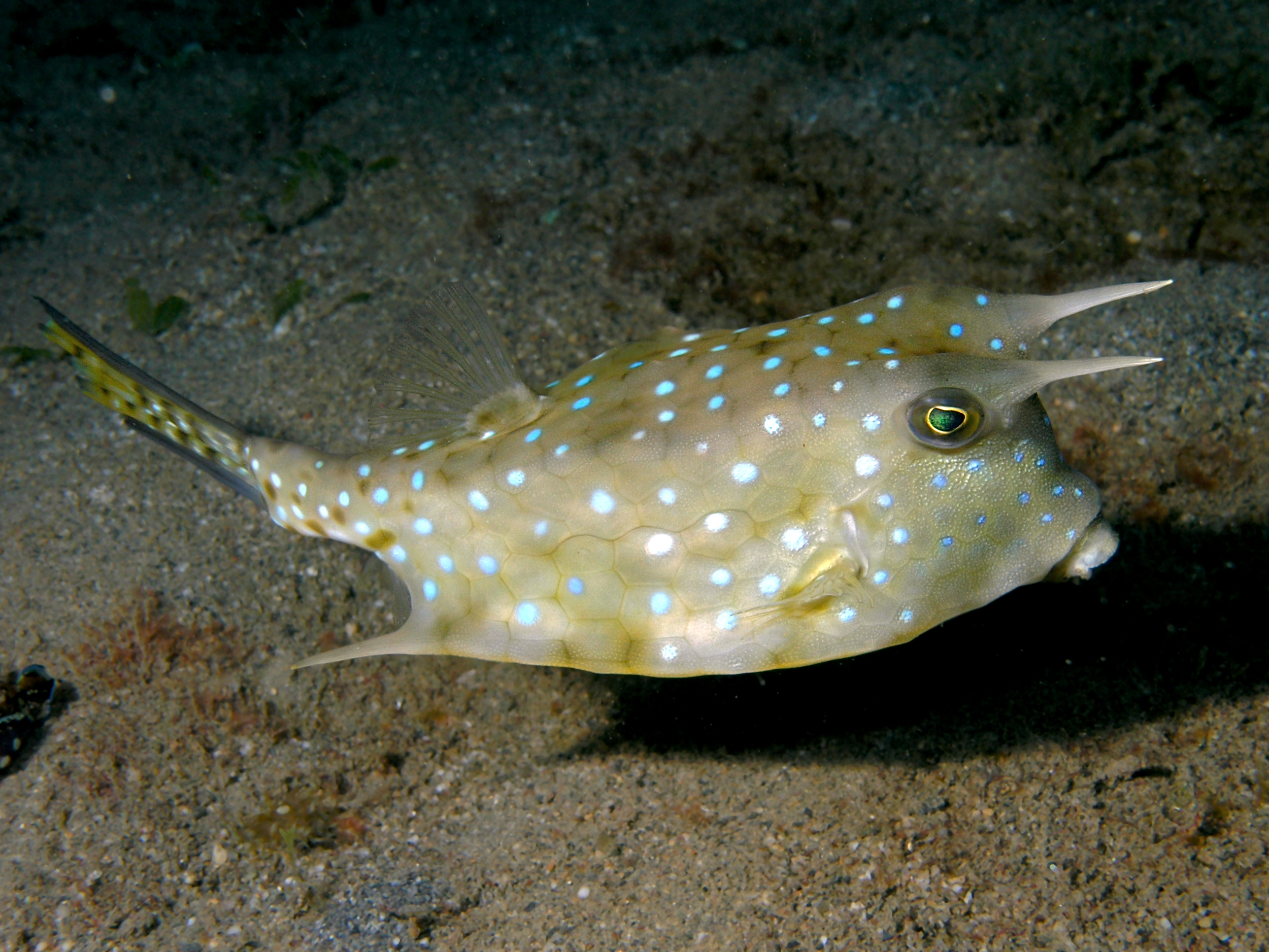
Longhorn cowfish with two forward and backward facing horns respectively to prevent itself from being swallowed

Some species of fish have weapons, though these traits are not as widespread as in mammals. Sawfish are named for their long rostrum, which can be used to inflict damage on other fish. Unicornfish may also use their strange horn-like forehead protection as a weapon, although the general use of this and many similar structures in fish are still somewhat enigmatic. Male salmon notably feature intraspecific competition for mates, and they use their elongated and toothy jaw to fight other males, both over access to females and over access to breeding sites.

Rostrum weapons on fish

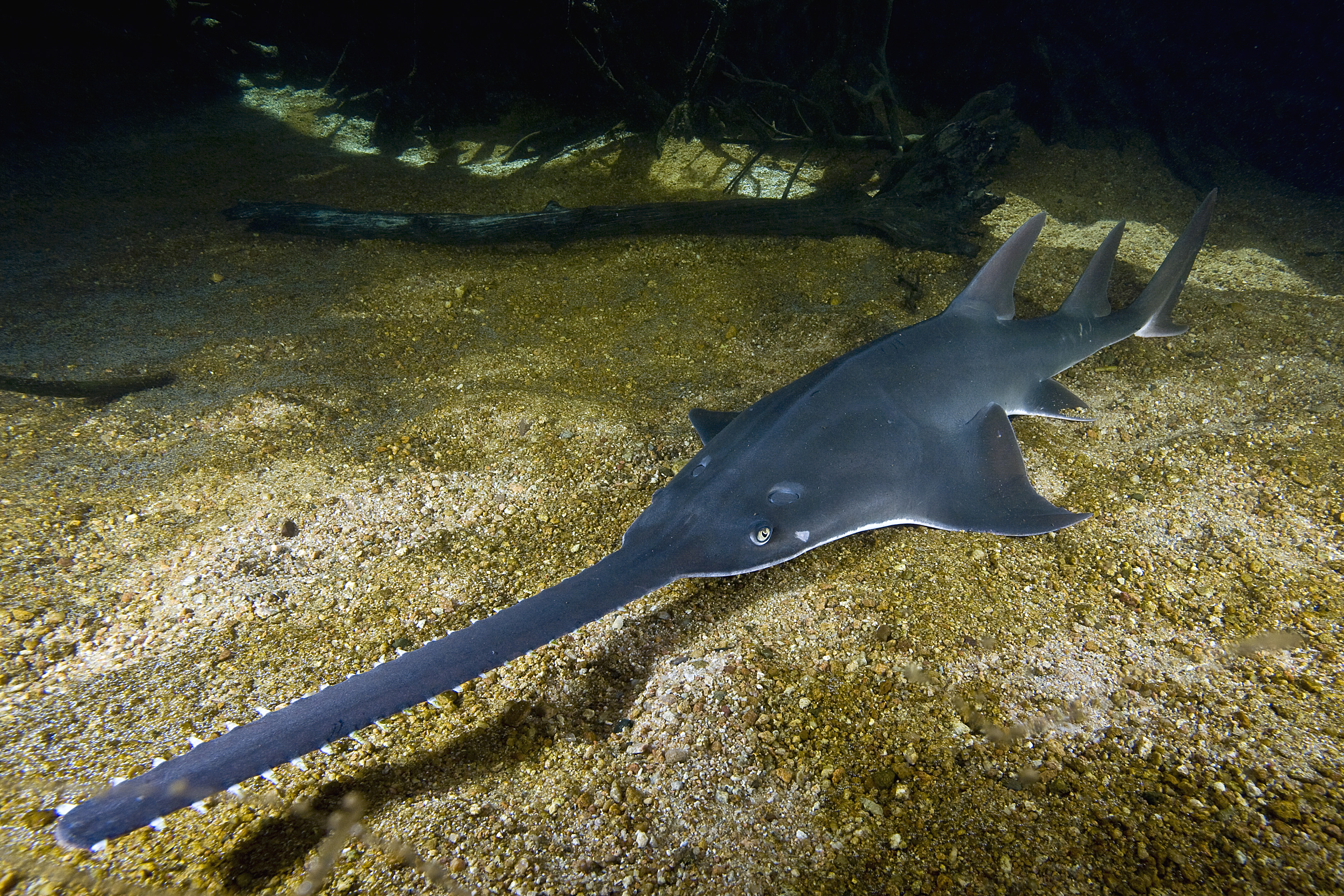
Sawfish with a "saw"-like rostrum

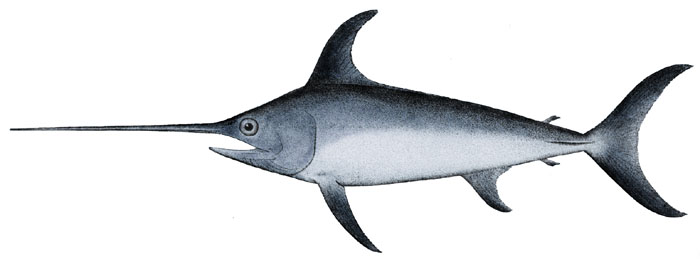
Swordfish with a "rapier"-like rostrum

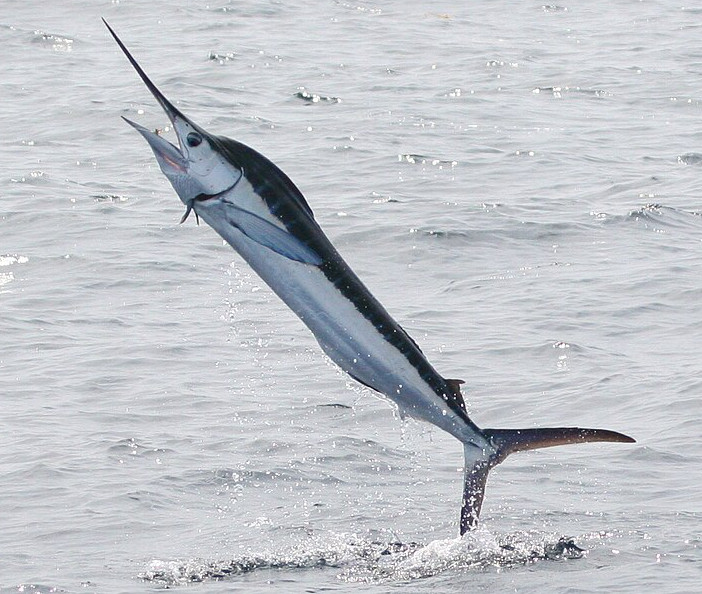
Marlin with a "rapier"-like rostrum

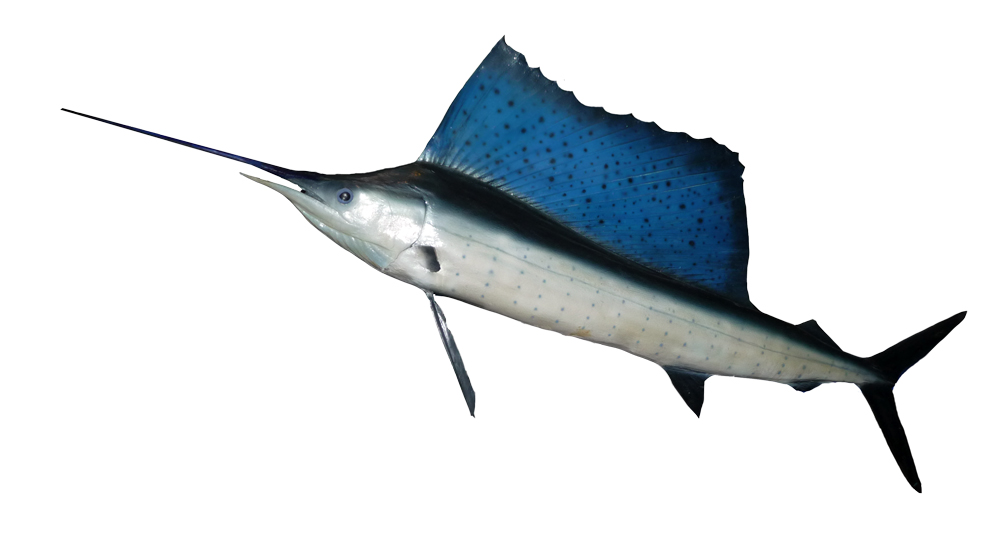
Sailfish with a "rapier"-like rostrum

Weapons are very widespread among insects, having been observed in nearly every major taxonomic group. Insects possess a huge variety of weapons, often with entirely different uses and modes of action. Rhinoceros beetles, like the mammal they are named for, have large horns which they famously use to fight for mates. Stag beetles have enlarged mandibles, which resemble the antlers of stags. Male stag beetles use these weapons to wrestle each other for favoured mating sites in a way that parallels the way stags fight over females. Fights may also be over food, such as tree sap and decaying fruits. Harlequin beetles have legs that are longer than their entire body, using which they protect a suitable spot for a female to lay eggs. They also possess strong mandibles to bite other males, which can include removing their legs. Camel crickets use spines on their tibias for two reasons; (1) to fight other males for access to females, and (2) to pin mates as a form of coercion. Among arthropods that are not insects, male fiddler crabs have large claws that comprise half their body mass and are used to attract mates elaborate waving displays with the claw. They are also, though somewhat less commonly, used as a weapon to directly attack other males.

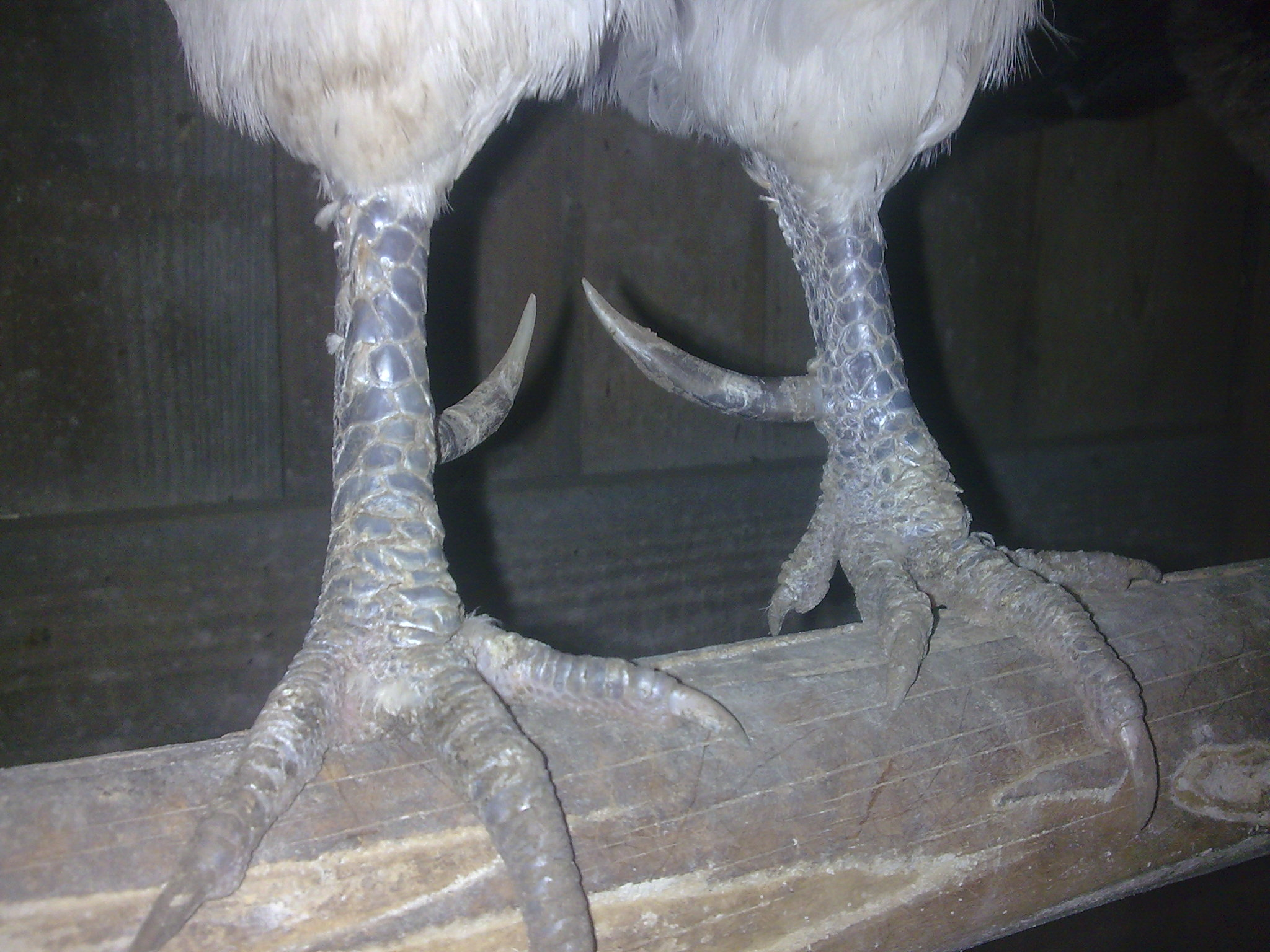
Spur (zoology)

Among various birds, spurs are a common weapon for defending against threats and fighting others of the same species. Spurs also occur in other animals, such as platypuses, which is also venomous.

== Evolution ==
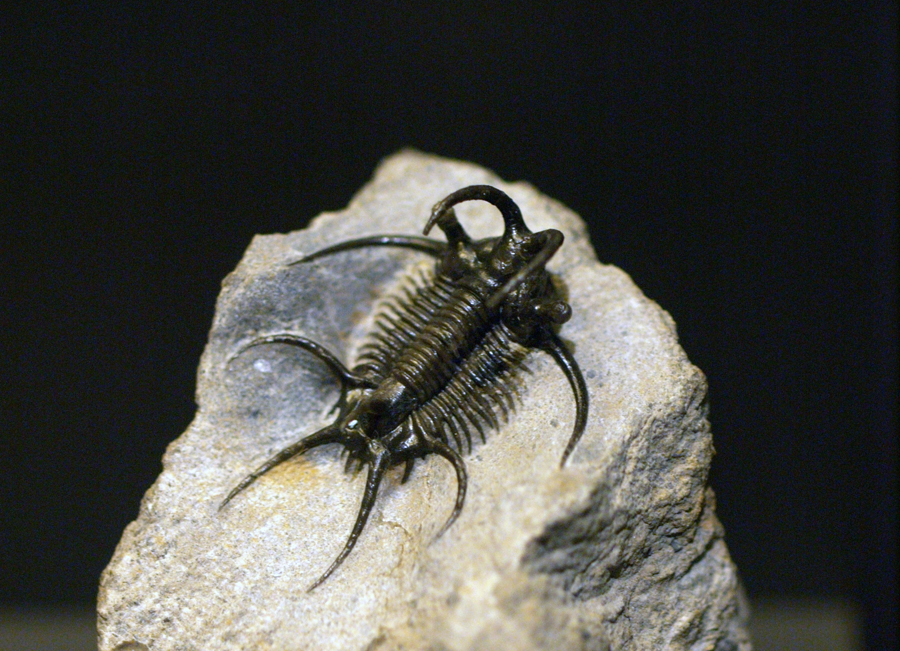
A trilobite of the genus Ceratarges, showing large spines probably used as weapons

Animal weaponry is capable of drastic and rapid diversification in form, with closely related species, even within the same clade, having distinctly different weaponry. One hypothesized mechanism for this is the gradual change in weaponry function from purely physical agonistic behavior, to a stronger emphasis on display, resulting in potentially more elaborate weapons. For instance, many dinosaurs may have had structures that were once weapons but were later used as ornaments to attract mates. Another possible mechanism is the presence of male-male combat, with diverging lineages of animals expanding into different habitats and then fighting under different conditions. Changes in the physical contest between species in different environments may potentially drive the evolution in modified weaponry. Sites that have localized, defendable resources, like a single food or water source, or a breeding burrow, often are where species with weapons are found.

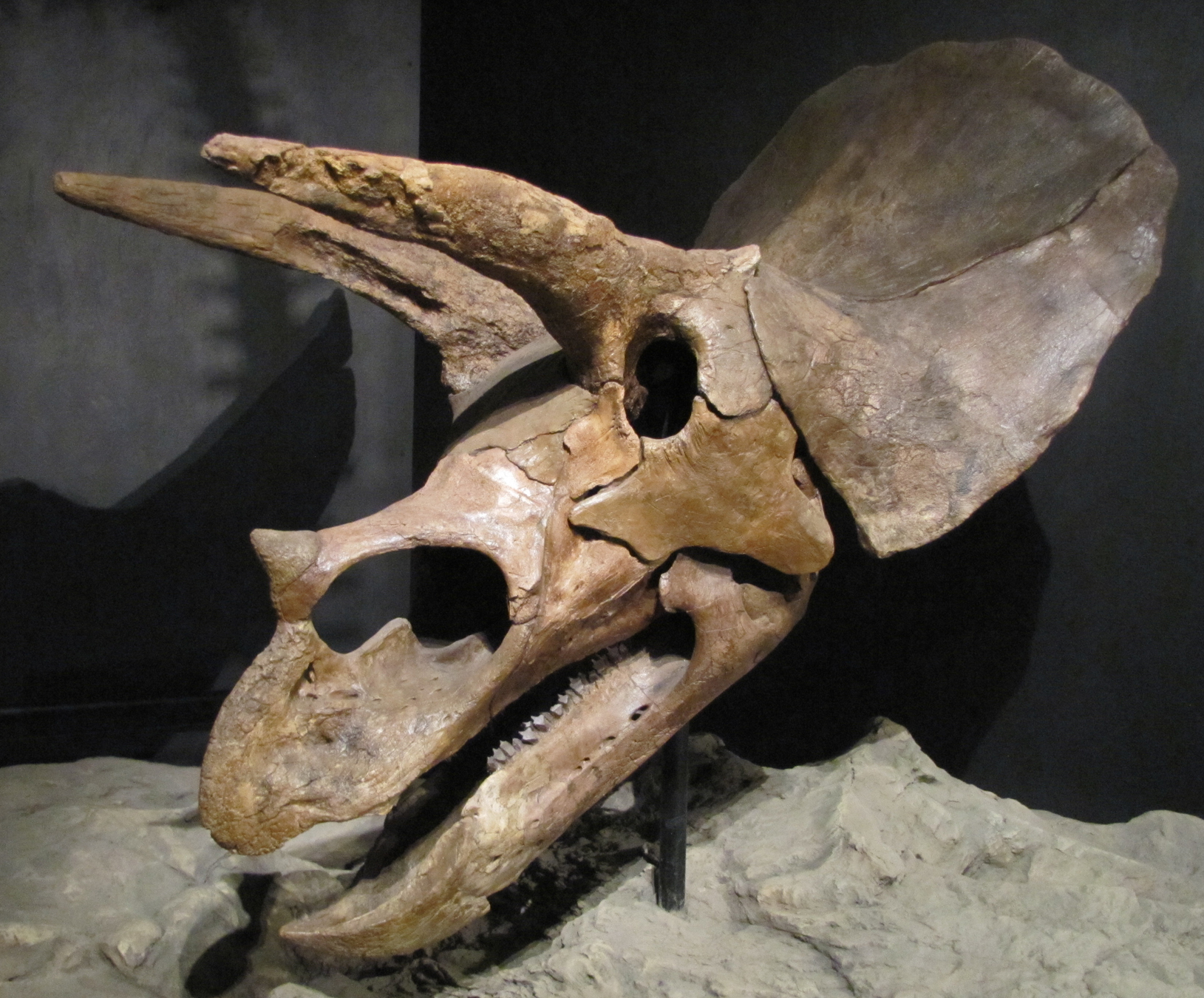
The horns that give Triceratops its name were used as weapons

Sexual selection has been a main focus on weaponry and antagonist interactions between animals, with males that present the largest weapons having the highest probability of winning. Sexual selection has been credited by previous researchers as the main influence of nature's extravagant weaponry for the purpose of attractive females. During agonistic interactions, there is the potential risk of weaponry lost resulting in a possible decrease in an individual's fighting ability and overall fitness.

Most animal weapons probably emerged independently. The weapons of ungulates, for instance, are believed to have evolved independently during the Age of Mammals, and are not from an earlier, basal clade of mammals. One group that had weapons early in the history of multicellular life were the trilobites, one of the earliest arthropods, and a dominant life form in the Paleozoic. Many species had horns or spikes which are theorized to have been used in intraspecific combat. Many dinosaurs also had weapons such as spines, spikes, and plates, although the exact use of these is not known for all species—some may have been used for mating displays more than as weapons.

An exception to the general independence of weapon evolution is found in stag beetles, whose common ancestor is believed to have had mandibles, much like modern stag beetles. However, that species likely had little or no sexual dimorphism in the mandible phenotype, unlike modern stag beetles, in which males usually have markedly larger mandibles than females. Dung beetles, on the other hand, have evolved and lost their weapons many, many times over their history, with the single genus Onthophagus, whose ancestor likely had horns, undergoing at least ten evolutionary events where horns were gained or lost.

== Usage and characteristics ==
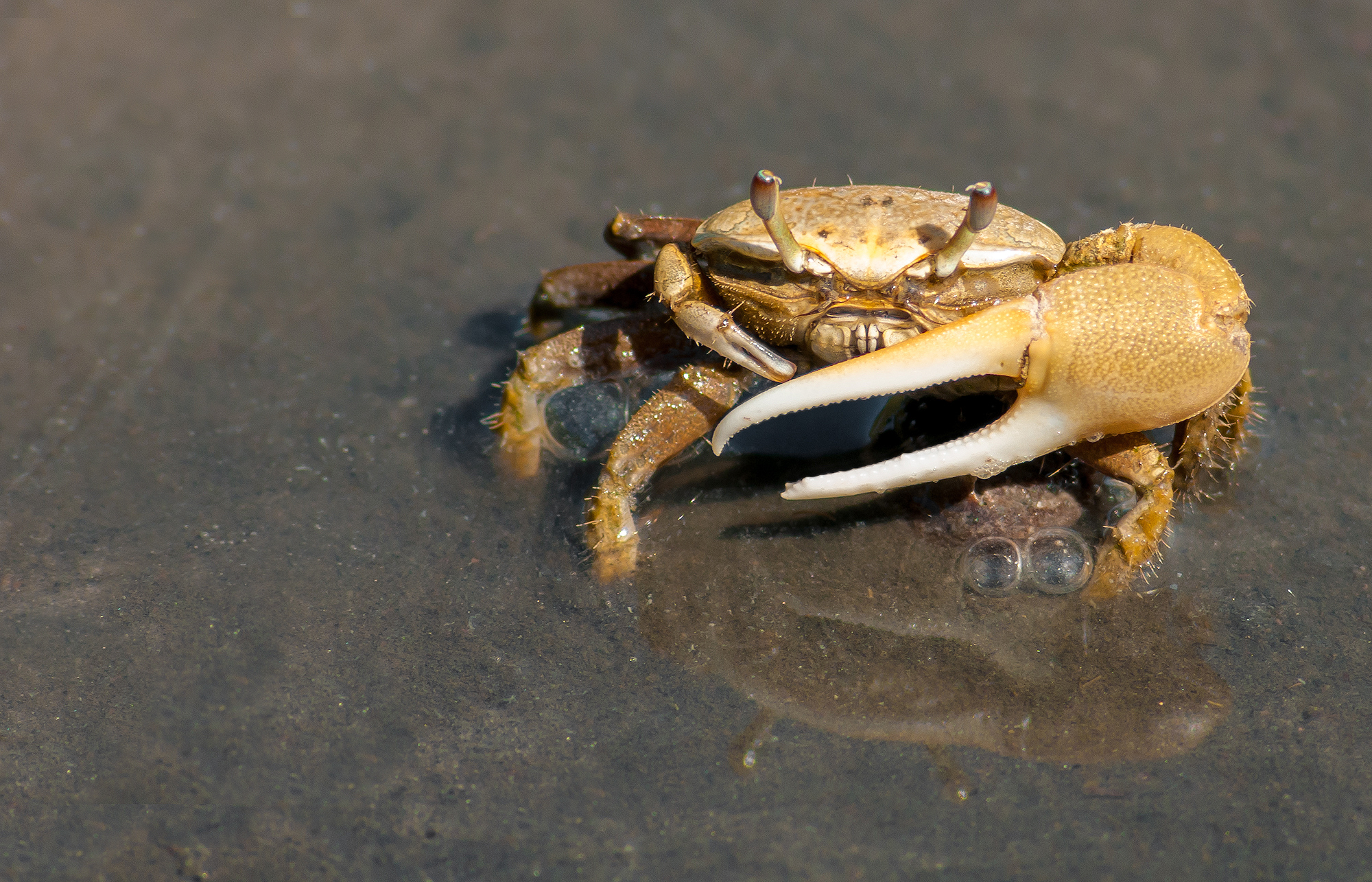
A fiddler crab uses its large claw as both a display ornament for females, and a weapon to directly compete with other males

Agonistic behaviors amongst animals for resources have been studied by many researchers, and specifically the interaction of weapons during these exchanges of behavior. Not only the presence of weaponry, but also specific characteristics of the weaponry itself can have an effect on the outcome of competition in determining the winners and losers from an intraspecies competition. The display of weaponry has been found to be favored in animals that frequently engage in contest as a mechanism to decrease the costs of aggression.

Most weapons that are studied are utilize to injure other individuals. These include the most famous weapons, such as antlers, horns, and mandibles; conversely, some animals have specialized "weapons" that actually fulfill a defensive role, such as the horned weevil, which have sheaths that can neutralize the horns of other beetles. Some of these weapons can be used to inject chemicals into enemies; tentacles and stingers are examples of this phenomenon. Other weapons are used to displace their opponents, usually to block burrows or entrances from other individuals. Some termites, for instance, use their heads as plugs to physically impede other termites from invading through the colony entrance. These termites also use their mandibles to displace enemies. Finally, many weapons are used for displays, with males using their large physical features to attract females to mate with. Additionally, most organisms display their weapons before fighting as a threat to other individuals. In general, displays are considered any behavior that is used to show a species' fighting ability without any physical contact, and the term applies to signalling both potential mates and potential opponents. This behavior allows for rivals to have the chance to assess the weaponry that is present to determine whether to engage in physical agonistic behavior or not.

=== Female weaponry ===
Since the publication of The Descent of Man and The Origin of Species, research has been heavily focused on weaponry in male animals, potentially leaving out females and their possible mechanisms behind present weaponry. Presence of weapons in females, and female-female competition has been seen in many species for better fitness of both sexual and social selection. Social selection, first hypothesized by Mary Jane West-Eberhard, is a broader term that includes both sexual and non sexual behaviors to increase an individual's fitness. For example, research has suggested that horns present in female bovids, may have evolved from competition for resources such as food.

== Gallery ==
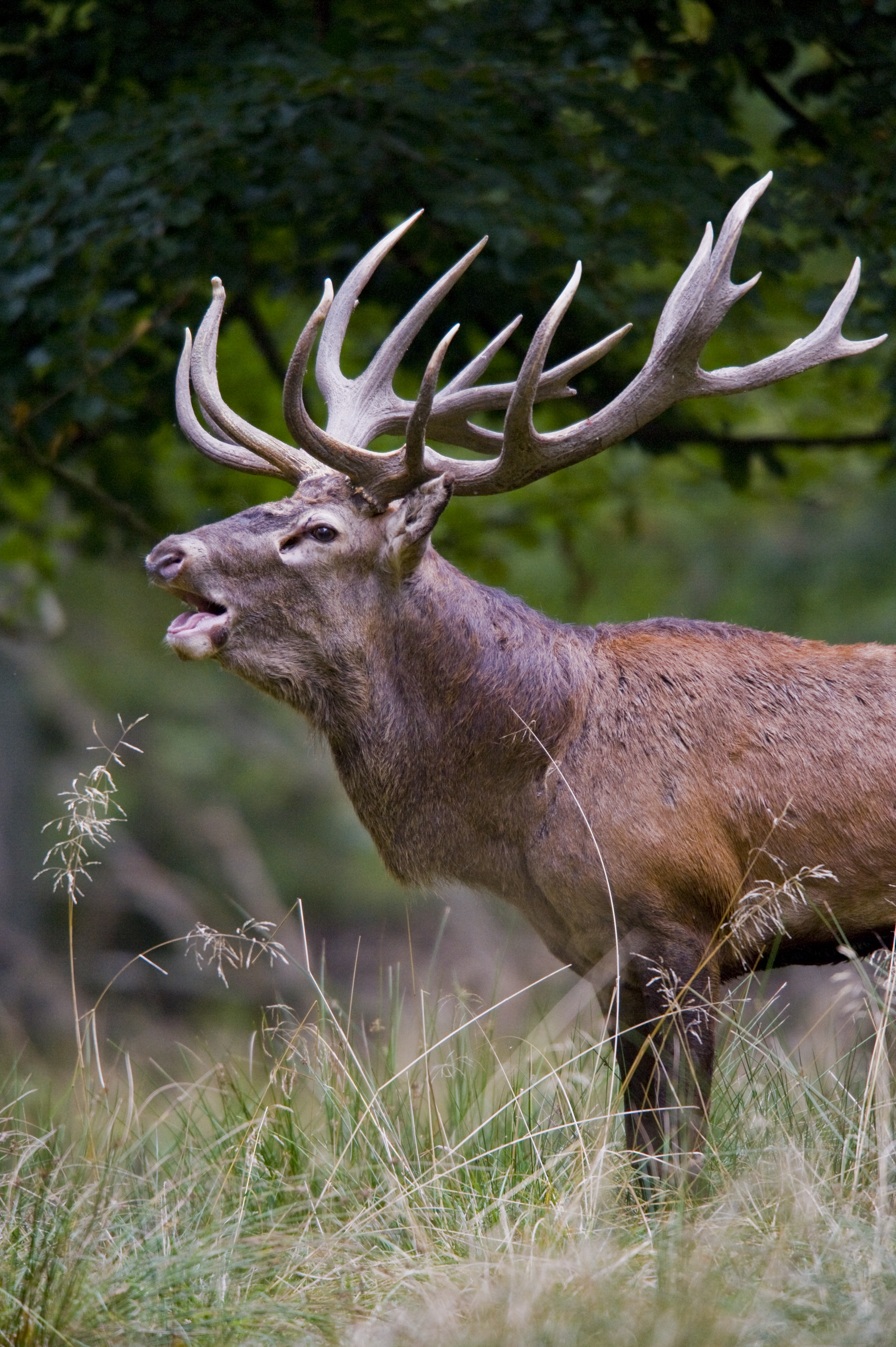
Antlers of a red deer

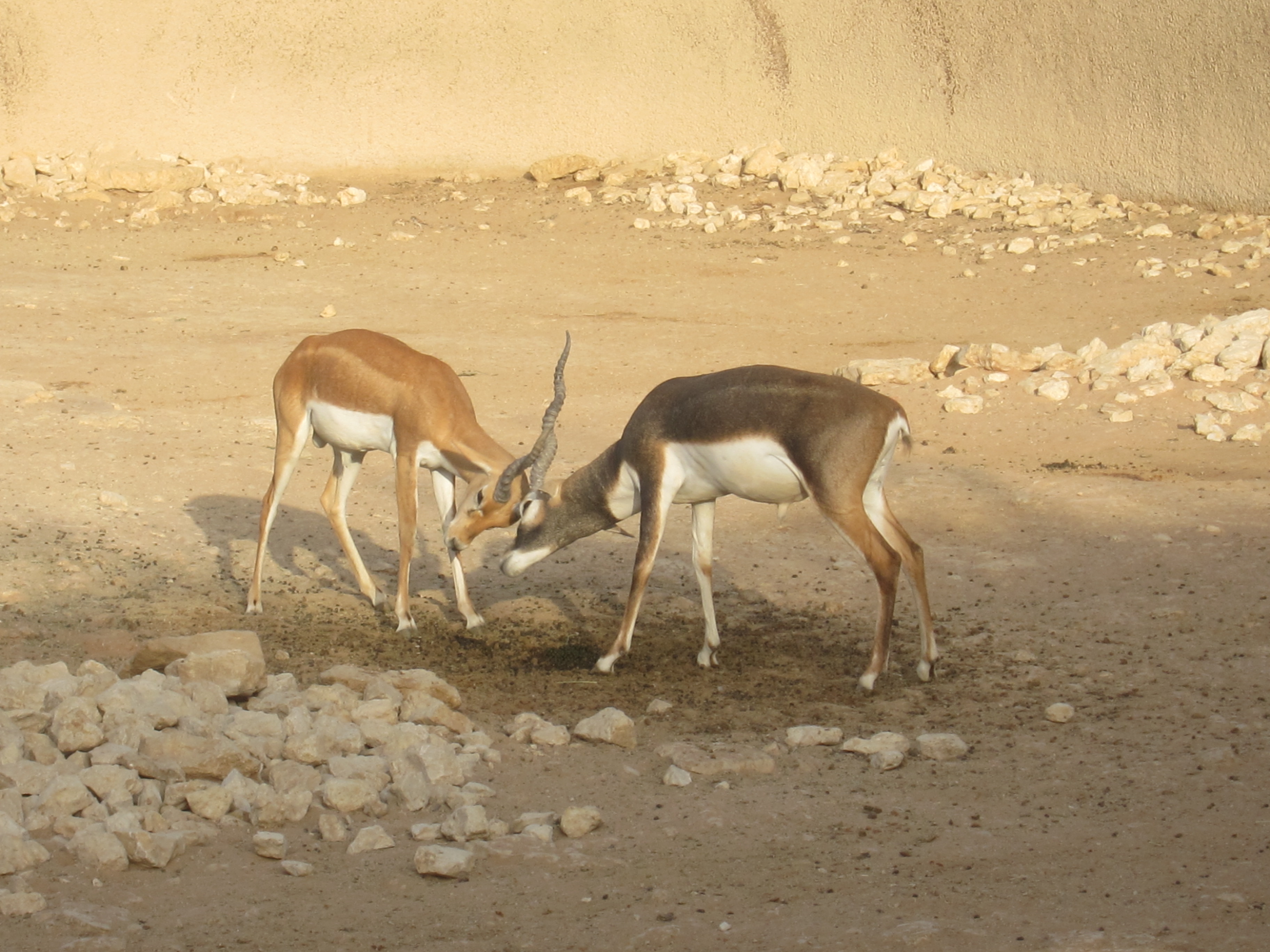
Blackbuck using their horns to fight

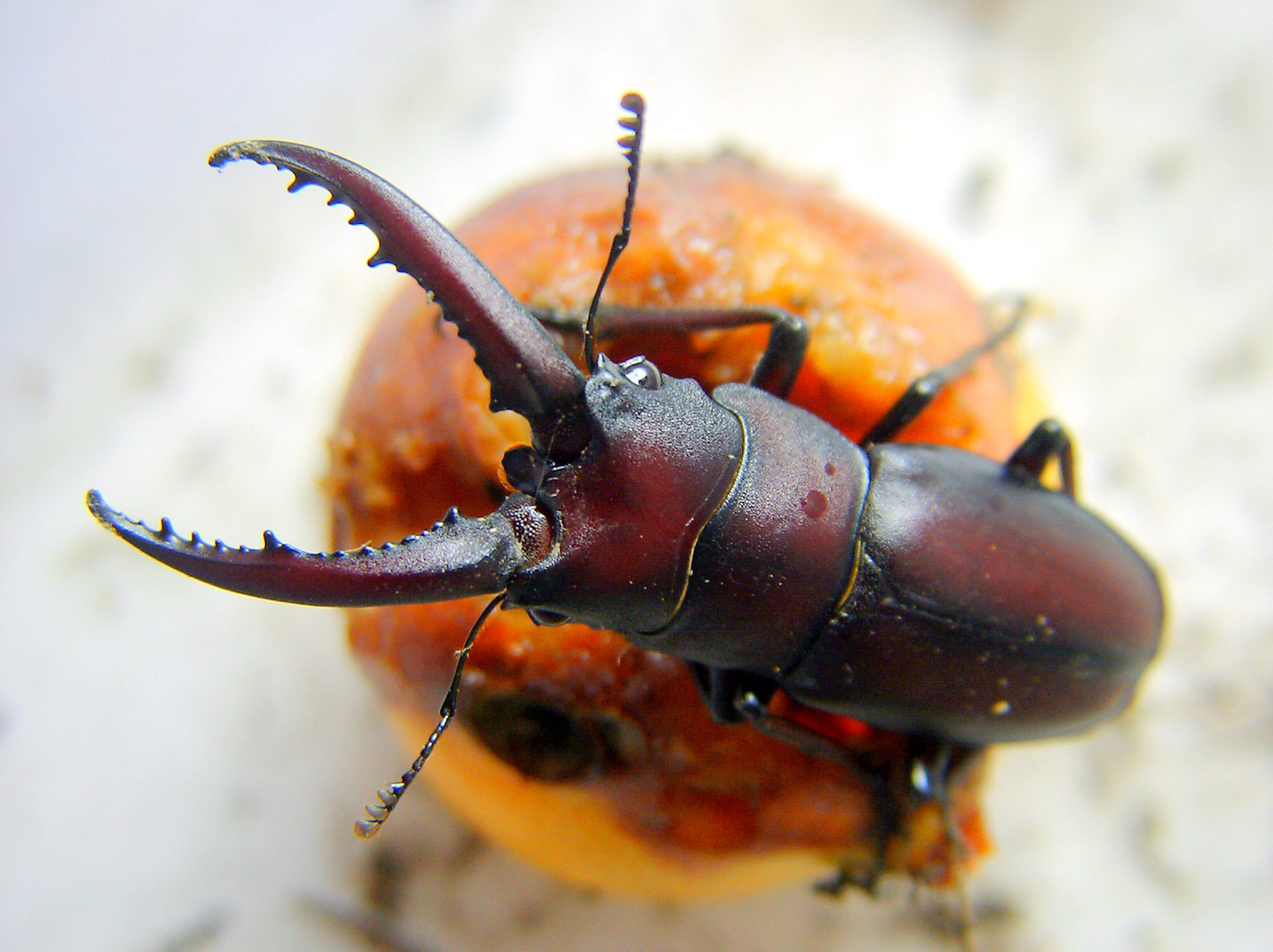
Mandibles of a stag beetle

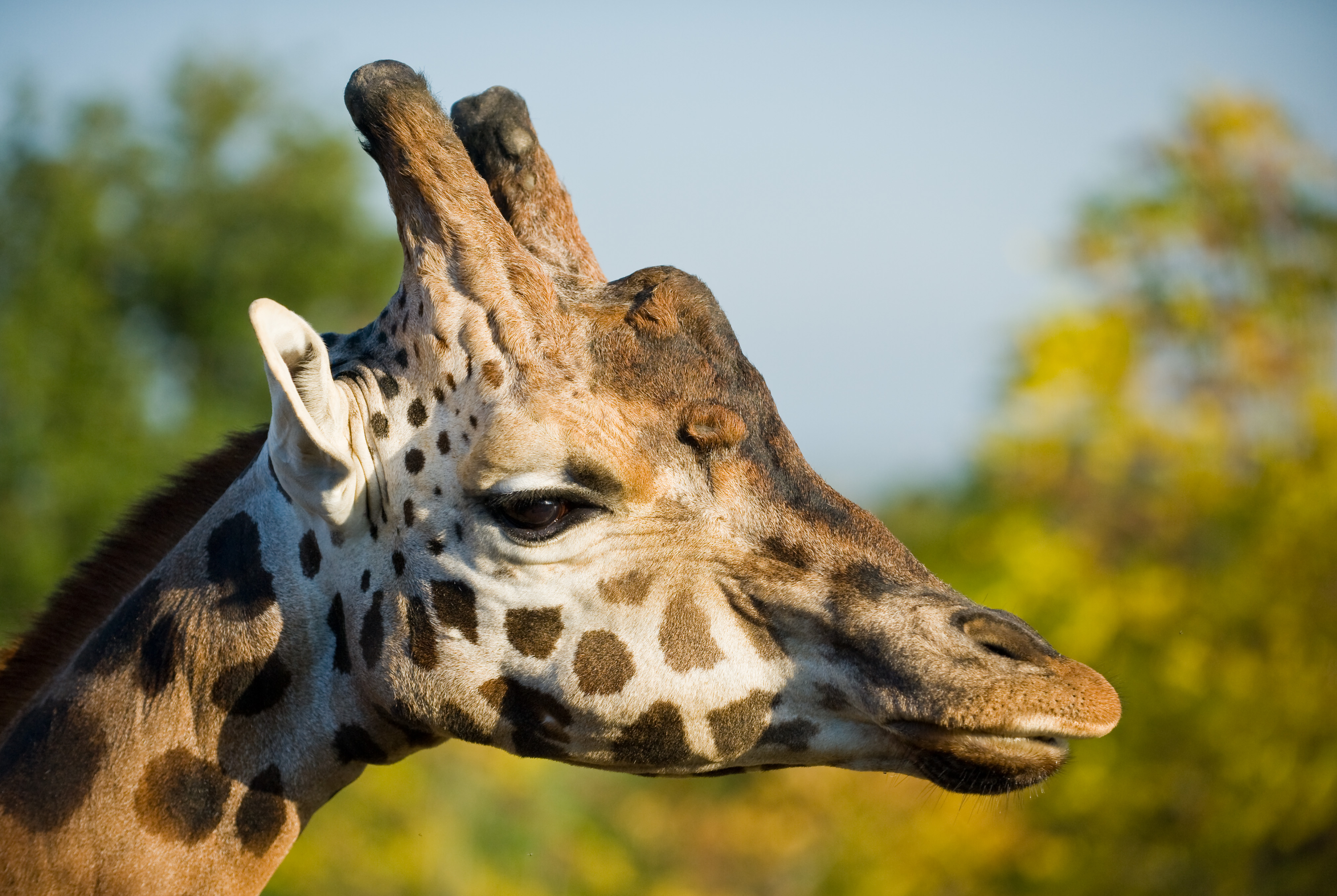
Ossicones of a giraffe

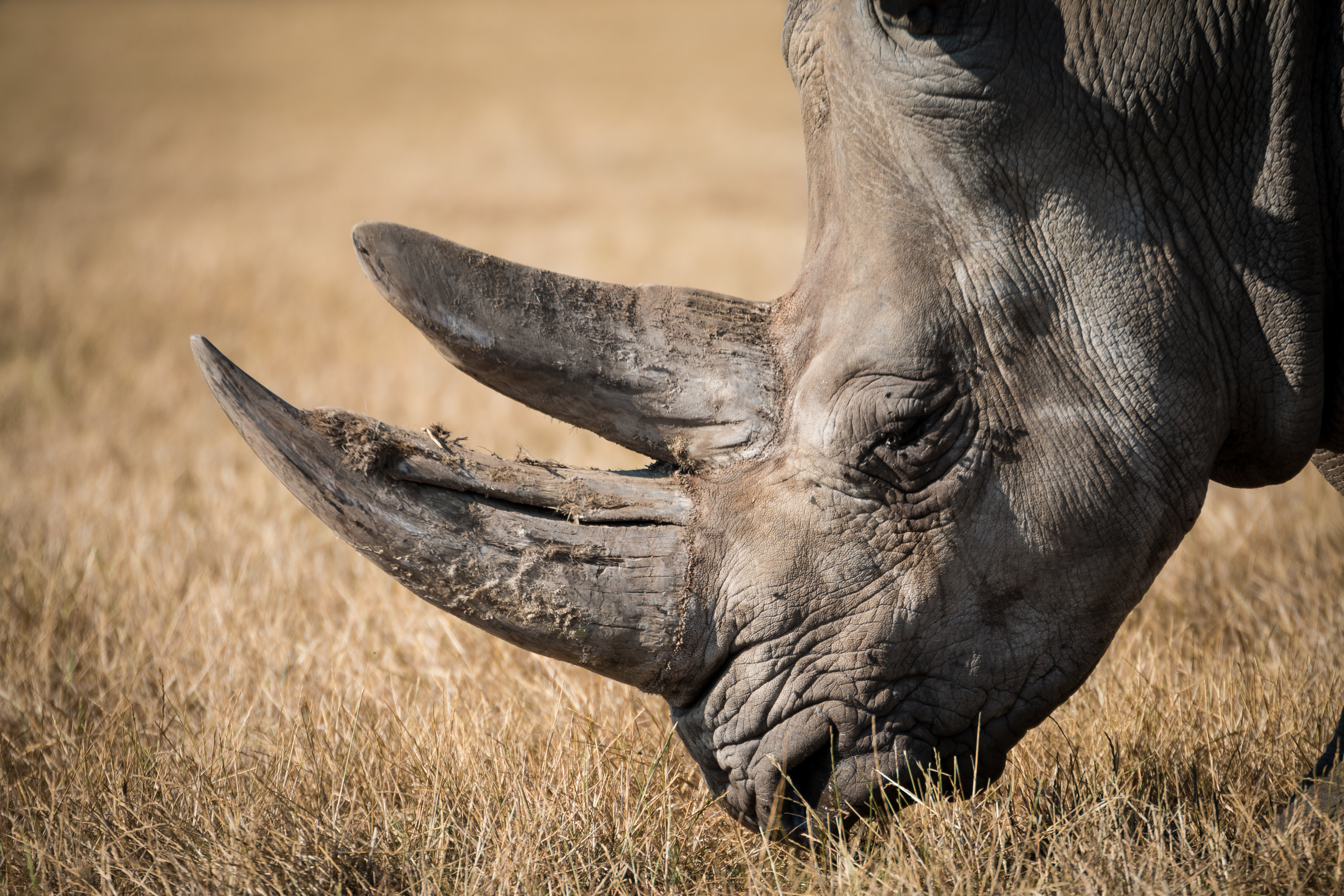
Rhinoceros horns

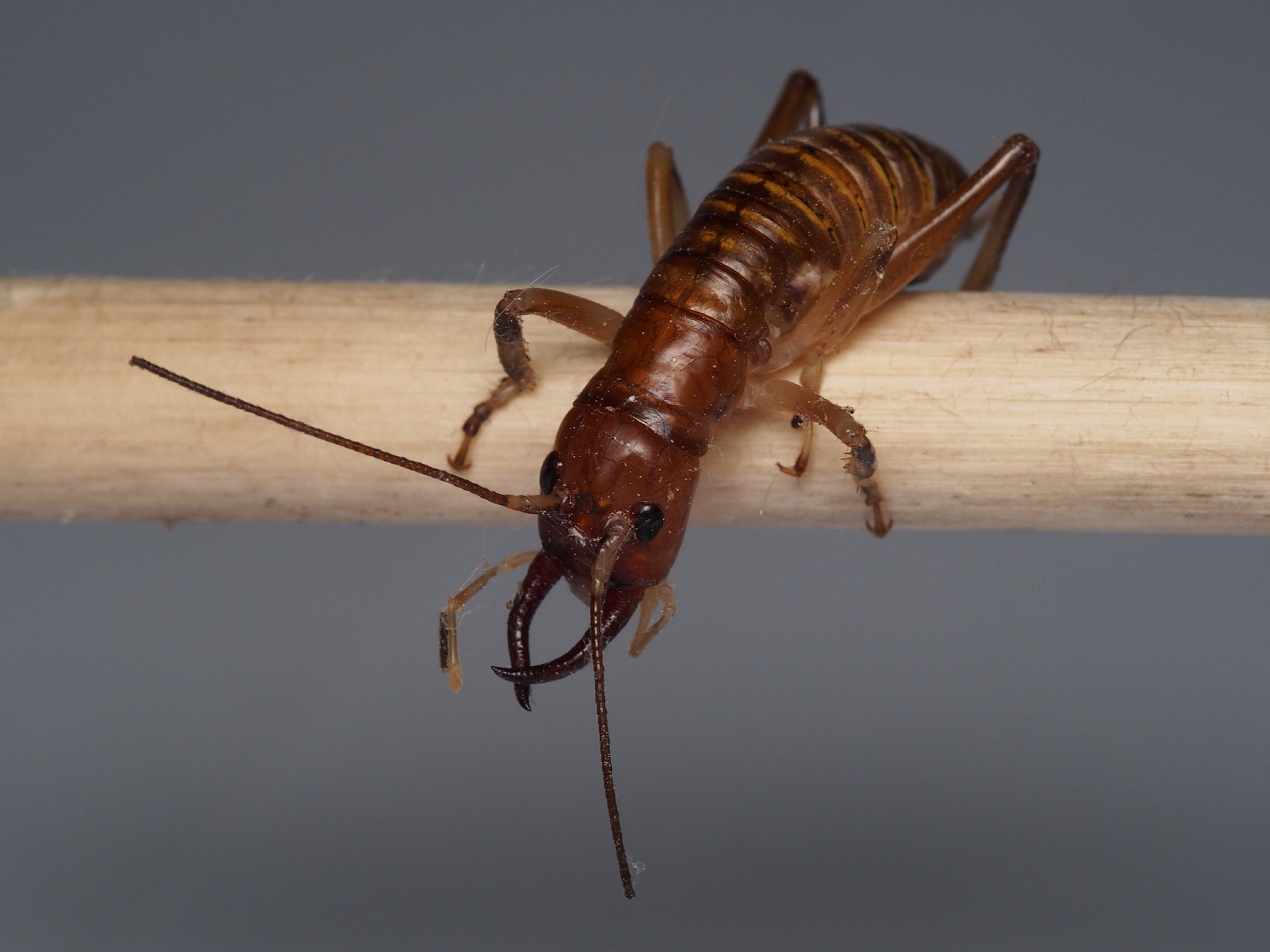
Mandibles of a tusked wētā

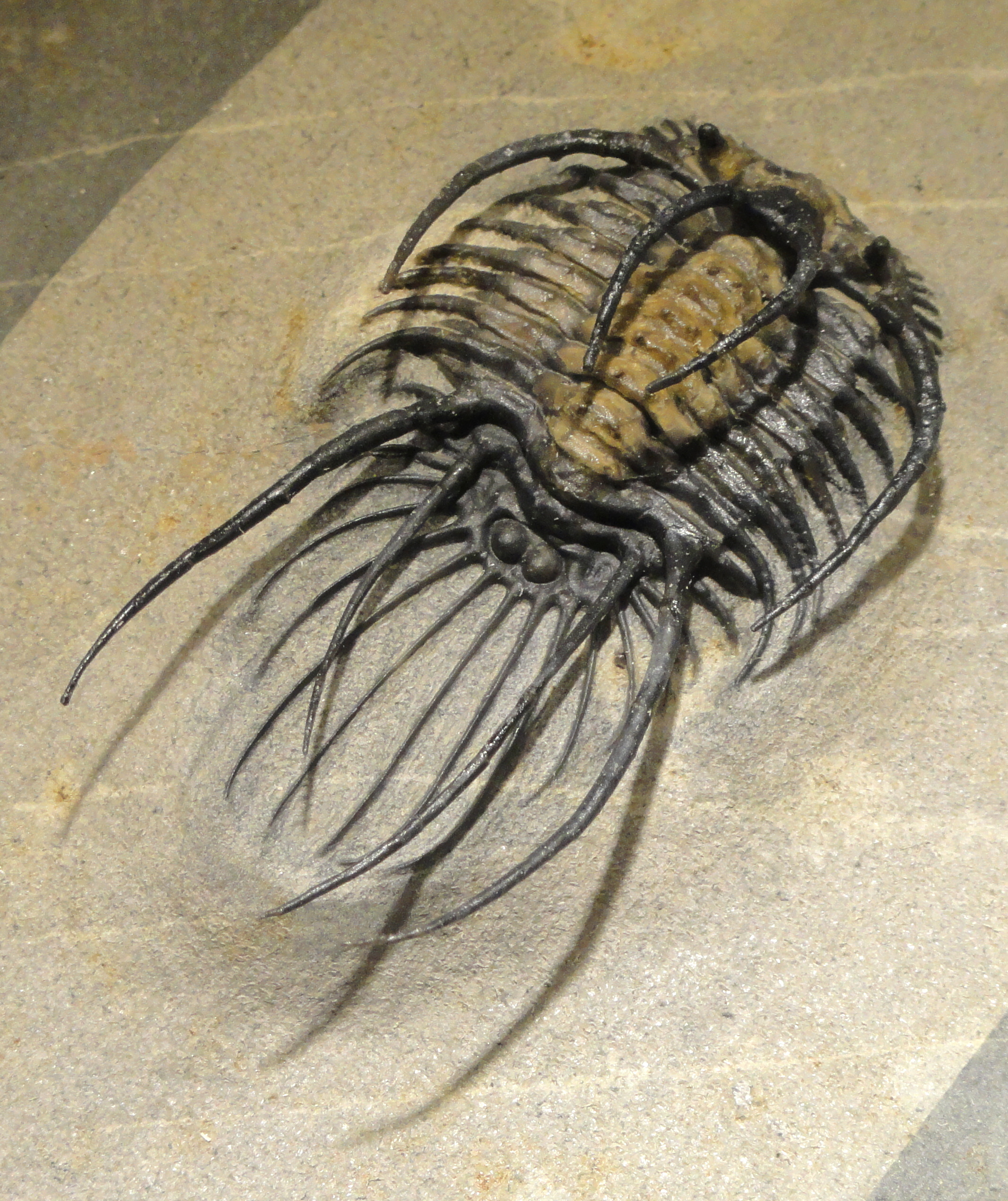
Spines of a trilobite

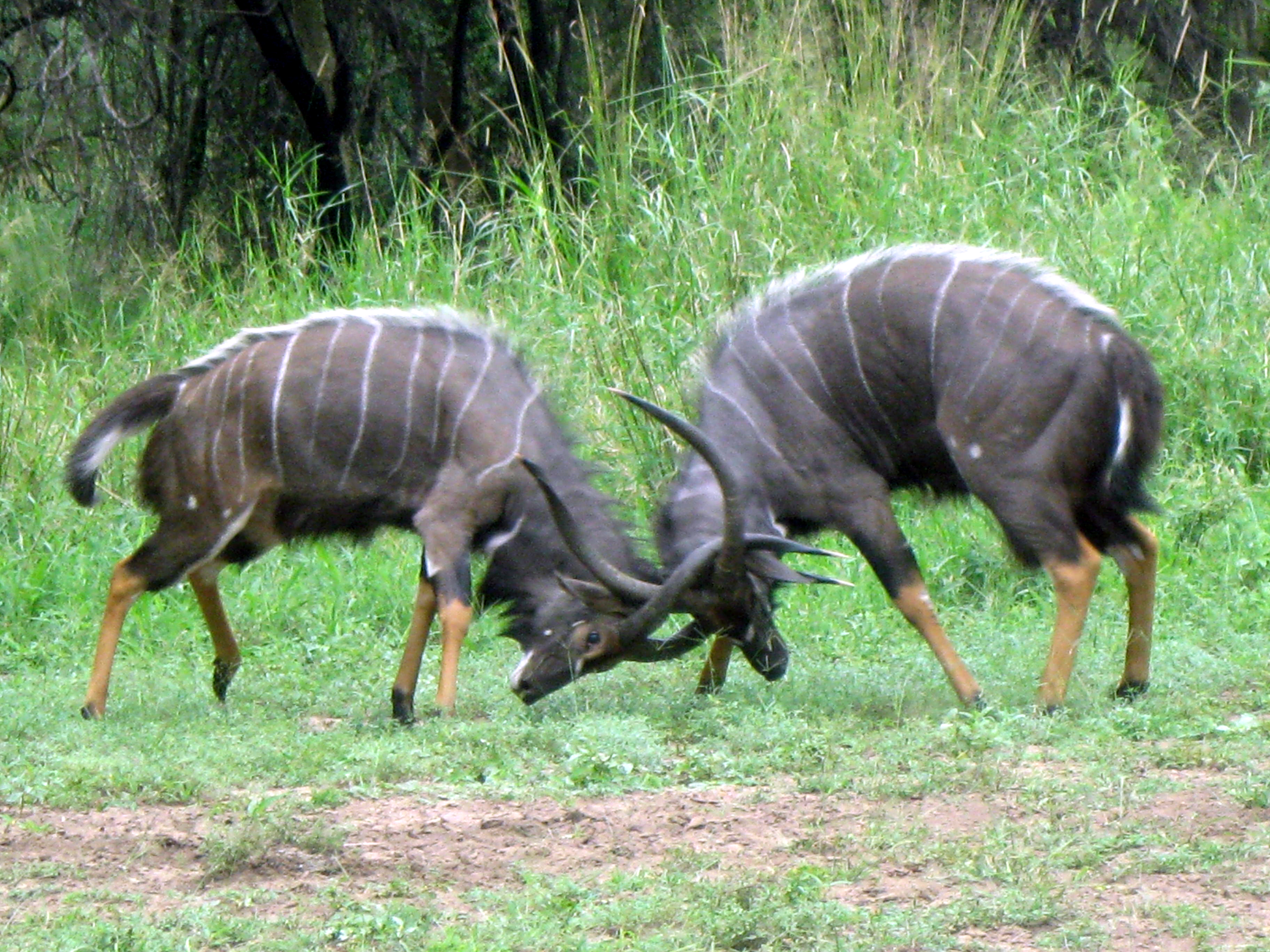
Nyalas fighting using their horns

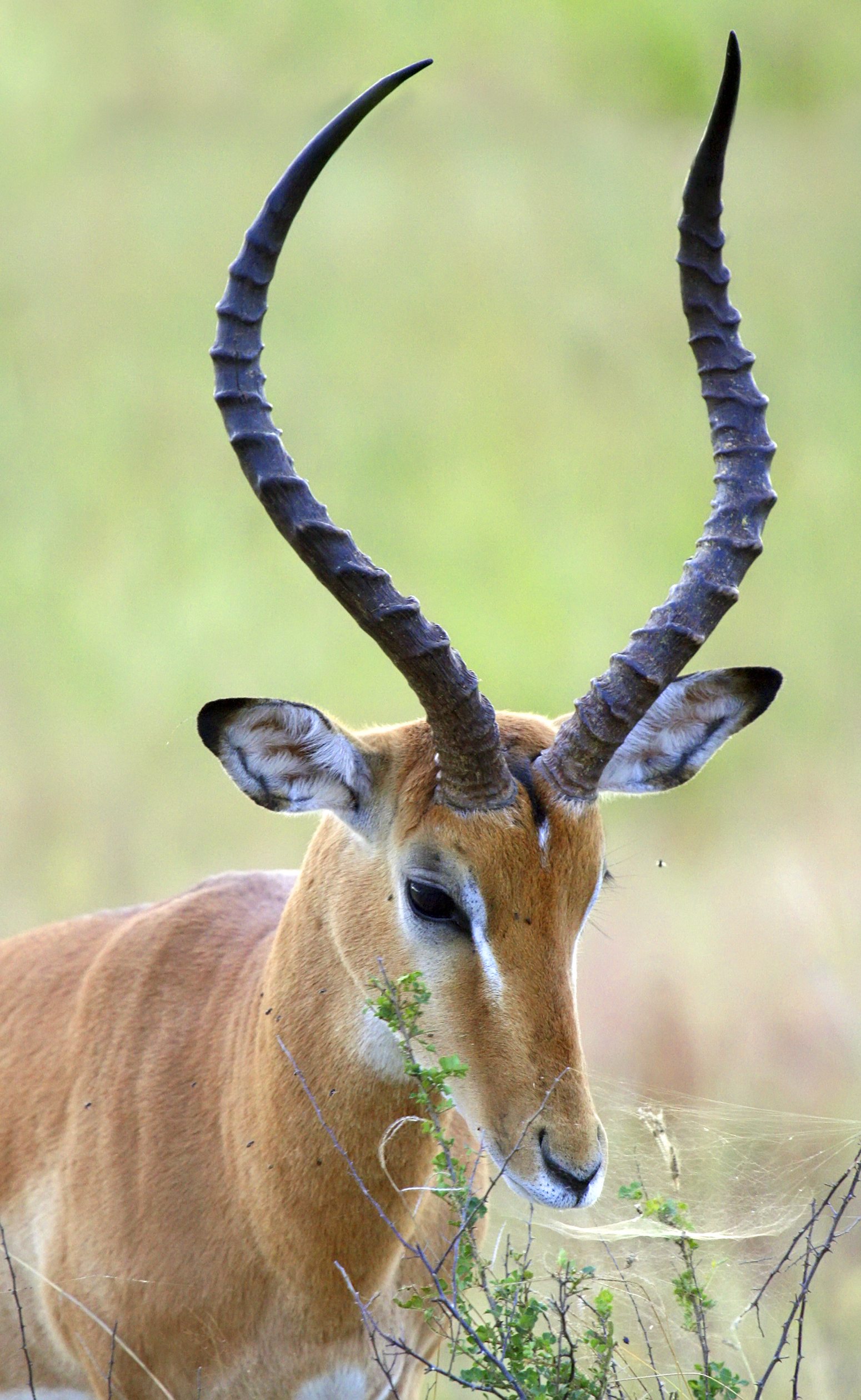
The impala uses horns to compete for resources

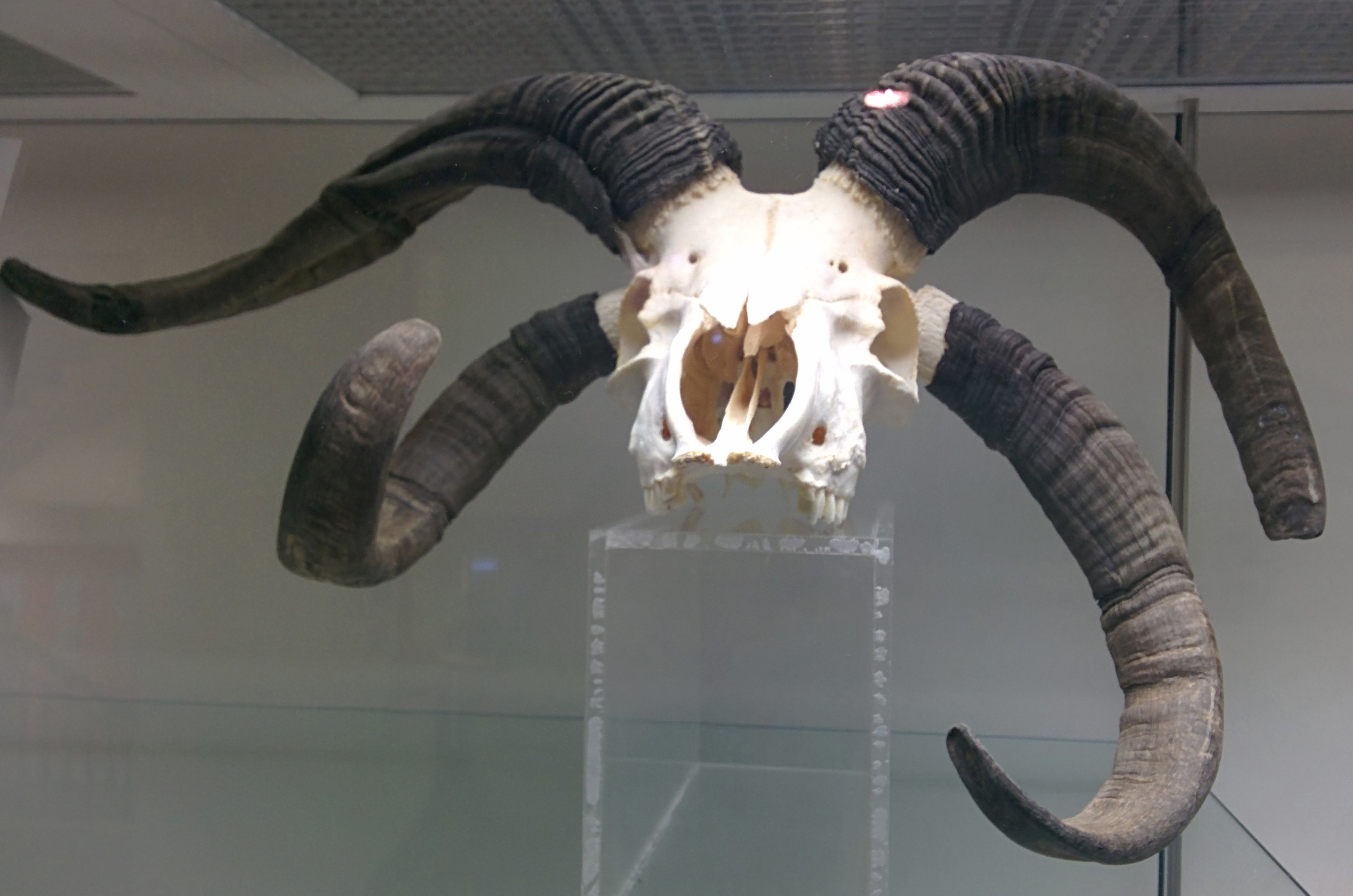
Polycerate Jacob sheep skull
