= Navajo-Churro =

North American sheep breed

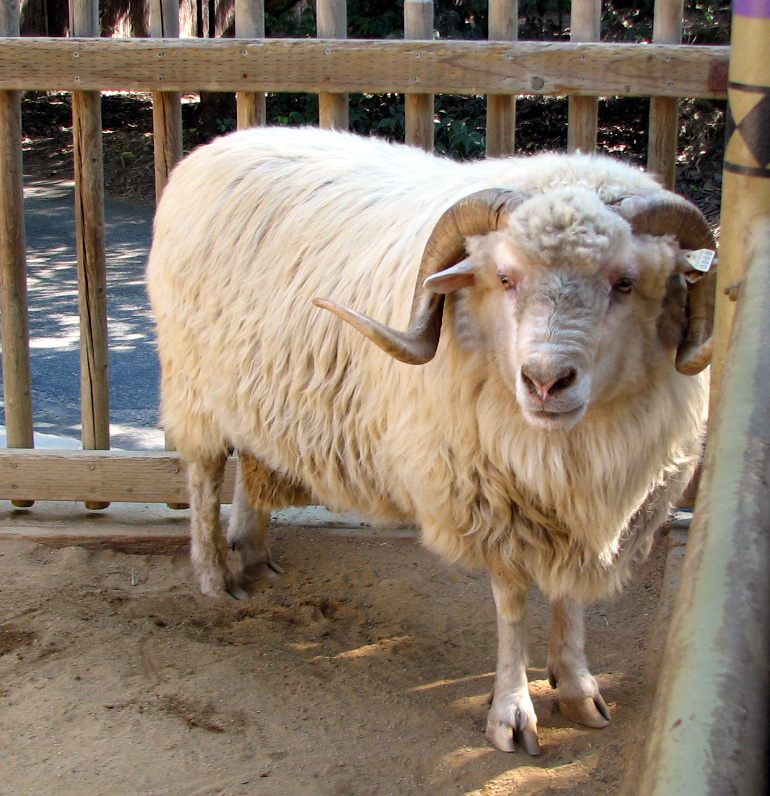
- A Navajo-Churro ram
- Conservation status: DAD-IS: at risk
- Other names: American Four-Horned Sheep, Navajo Four-Horned Sheep
- Country of origin: United States
- Use: wool, milk, pelts, meat

Traits
- Weight: Male: 55–85 kg (121–187 lb); Female: 40–60 kg (88–132 lb)

The Navajo-Churro, or Churro for short, (also American or Navajo Four-Horned) is a breed of domestic sheep originating with the Spanish Churra sheep obtained by the Diné around the 16th century during the Spanish Conquest. Its wool consists of a protective topcoat and soft undercoat. Some rams have four fully developed horns, a trait shared with few other breeds in the world. The breed is highly resistant to disease. Ewes often bear twins, and they have good mothering instincts. This breed is raised primarily for wool, although some also eat their meat.

The common Diné word for the breed, Dibé dits’ozí, means "long fleeced sheep." T’áá Dibé is also occasionally used, meaning "first sheep." The churro is important to Diné subsistence and culture.

== History ==
The Spanish Churra (renamed Churro by American frontiersmen) was first imported to North America in 1598 by Juan de Oñate and used to feed Spanish armies and settlers. By the 17th century, Churros were popular with the Spanish settlers in the upper Rio Grande Valley. The Diné acquired Churro flocks by trading. The Churro soon became an important part of the Diné economy and culture. The Navajo bred sheep to adapt to a pastoral lifestyle in a harsh desert environment.

During the Navajo Wars, American soldier Kit Carson instructed his troops to destroy Navajo crops and kill their livestock, including the Churro sheep, in 1863. They killed thousands of sheep. Some small clusters in remote canyons survived the attack. The entire Navajo nation was then forced to march to a reservation. The Navajo nation and the US government signed the Treaty of Bosque Redondo in 1868, allowing the Navajo to return to their homeland. As part of the agreement, the US government provided sheep to the Navajo; however, these breeds were unfamiliar and contaminated the Churro sheep line.

In the 1930s, the US government implemented the Navajo Livestock Reduction, intended to reduce the amount of sheep and horses on Diné lands. Tens of thousands of Churro sheep were slaughtered, and their numbers dwindled. The Livestock Conservancy estimated that less than 450 Churros remained by the 1970s. This reduction of the flocks drove many Diné ranchers into poverty. Many Diné who had traditionally lived off the land and agriculture turned to wage work.

Restoration of the breed began in the 1970s when breeders began acquiring Churro phenotypes with the purpose of preserving the breed and revitalizing Diné and Hispanic flocks. The Navajo Sheep Project, headed by Lyle McNeal, was the first organization to start a breeding program.

While the Navajo-Churro breed is no longer in danger of extinction, it is still considered a rare breed. There were over 8,000 head of Navajo-Churro sheep in 2022.

== Cultural role ==
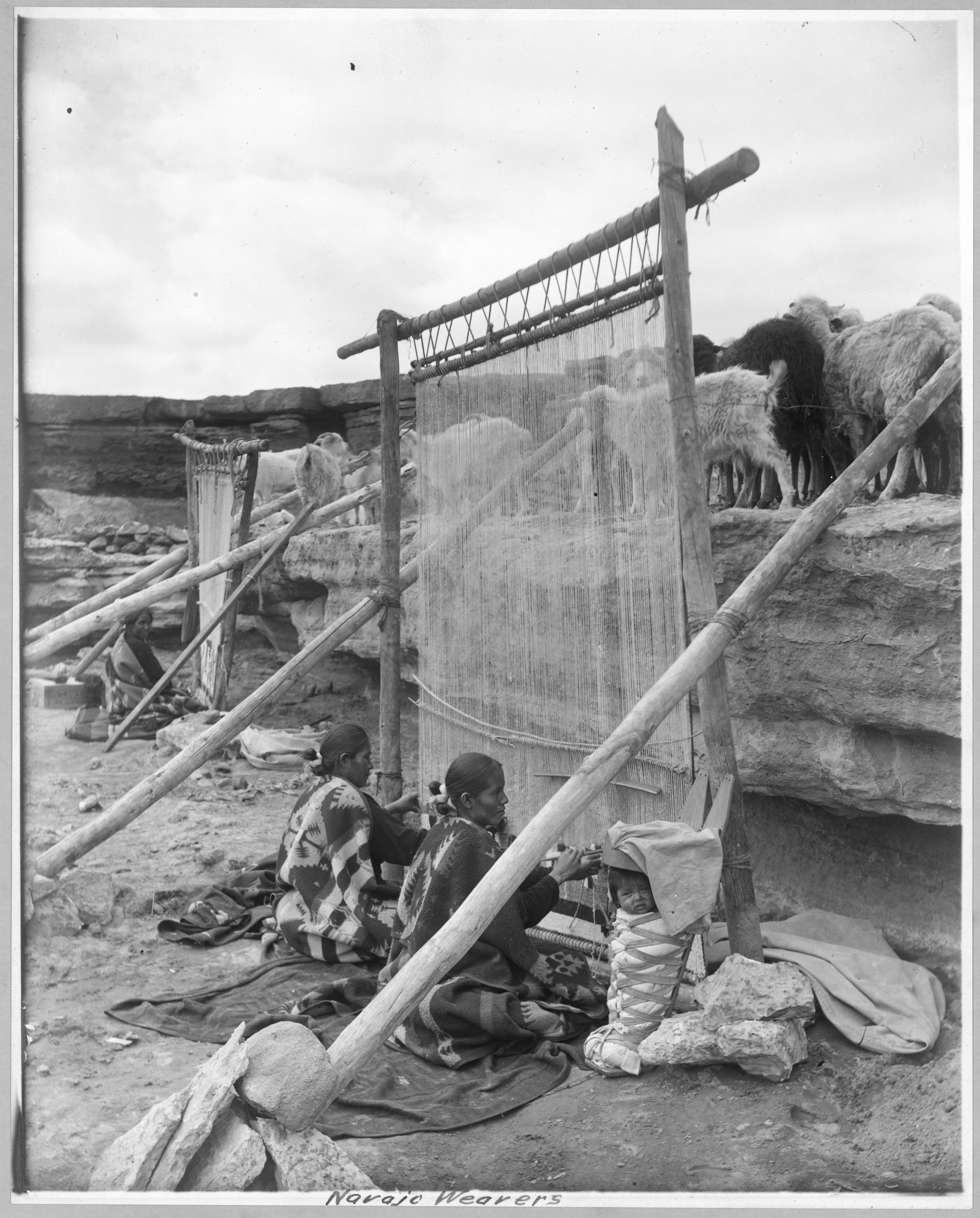
Diné women weaving outdoors with their flocks in the background

Diné weavers have used Churro wool to make rugs, wall hangings, and other products since the late 1600s. The sheep naturally produce wool in fourteen colors, so weavers can produce complex colorwork without needing to dye the wool. The yarn produced from the wool is durable, coarse, and non-pilling. Many Diné through the early 20th century made their livelihood in farming and ranching. Woven products, such as rugs and blankets, were and continue to be important exports.

Carding wool, spinning yarn, and weaving are traditionally women's work among the Diné. As such, flocks of sheep traditionally belonged to women and were passed from a mother to her children. Children learned to tend the sheep at a young age.

The specific Churro breed, as opposed to sheep in general, is an important part of Diné cultural identity. Elders in particular remembered the Churro flocks from the early 20th century. Some were overjoyed to see the revitalization from the 1970s onward:

I said, "Why are you crying for grandpa?" He said, "It's been a long time since I've seen these sheep. I'm so happy that they're here again."

== Description ==
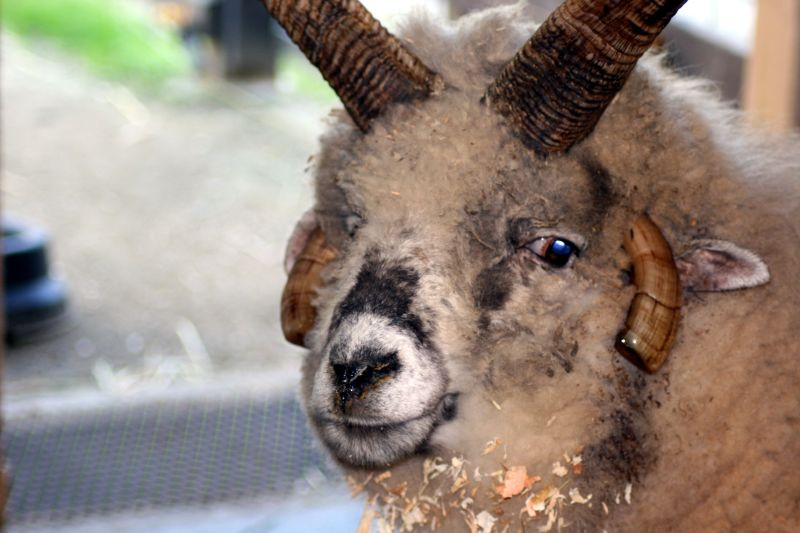
Navajo-Churro sheep at the San Francisco Zoo with four horns

Churros are small sheep with long, thin tails, horizontal ears, and a double coat. Ewes are 40–60 kg (88–132 lb), while rams are 55–85 kg (121–187 lb). The sheep are long-lived and can be productive for up to 15 years. An ideal Churro, according to the breed standard, has a bare face, bare legs, and a mostly bare belly. The sheep are hardy with light bones, narrow bodies, and long legs. They do not reach their full-grown size until well into their second year.

Most rams have horns, either two or four. Rams may also have scurs or be polled. Ewes are more likely to have scurs or be polled; however, they may also have two or four horns. Sheep with more than two horns are polycerate. Although this is more common in rams, the polycerate trait appears in ewes as well. This is because they possess a mutation on the HOXD1 gene, a mutation also found in old heritage breeds like the Jacob Sheep.

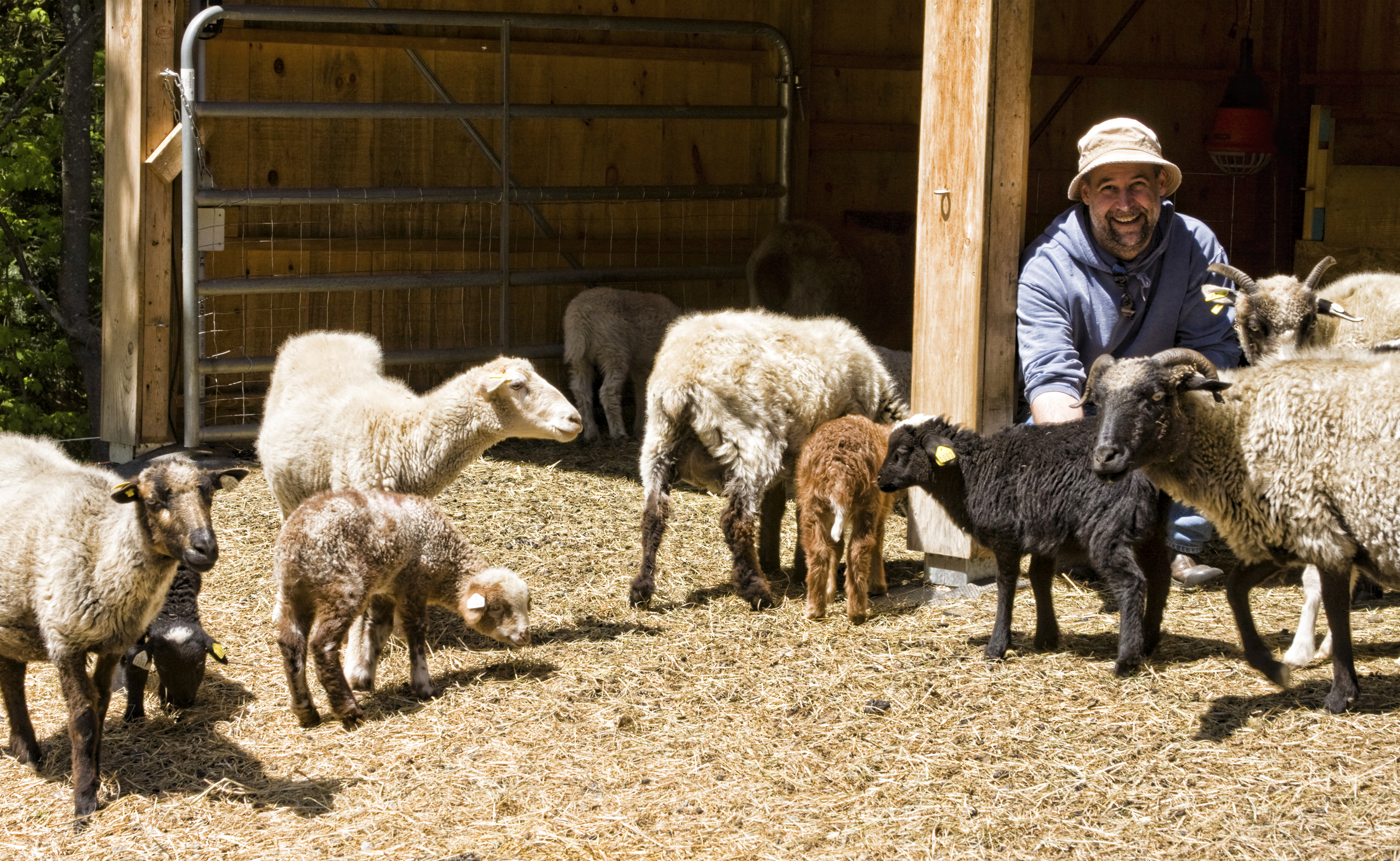
This small flock of Navajo-Churros shows a common variety of colors.

Churros come in a variety of colors, including reds, browns, black, white, and mixes, and color may change with age. The color is separated into the fleece color and the points color (legs and head). The sheep may also have different color patterns, such as eye patches and hip spots.

== Fleece and meat ==
The Navajo-Churros possess a dual coat, which has an inner and an outer layer. The fleece is composed of an inner coat (80% of fleece), and outer coat that is hair fibers (10-20% of fleece) and kemp (a coarse, opaque fiber, less than 5% of fleece).

The fleece color is separated from the points color. The fleece can often change from lamb to adulthood. Blacks, for instance, often white out with age.

The meat is lean with a low fat content. Meat may be eaten for sustenance, or it may be used in traditional medicine.

== Listings ==
Navajo-Churros are listed by The Livestock Conservancy as critical. They are also part of the Ark of Taste, a list of endangered heritage foods catalogued by Slow Food.
