= Polycerate =

Animal with more than two horns

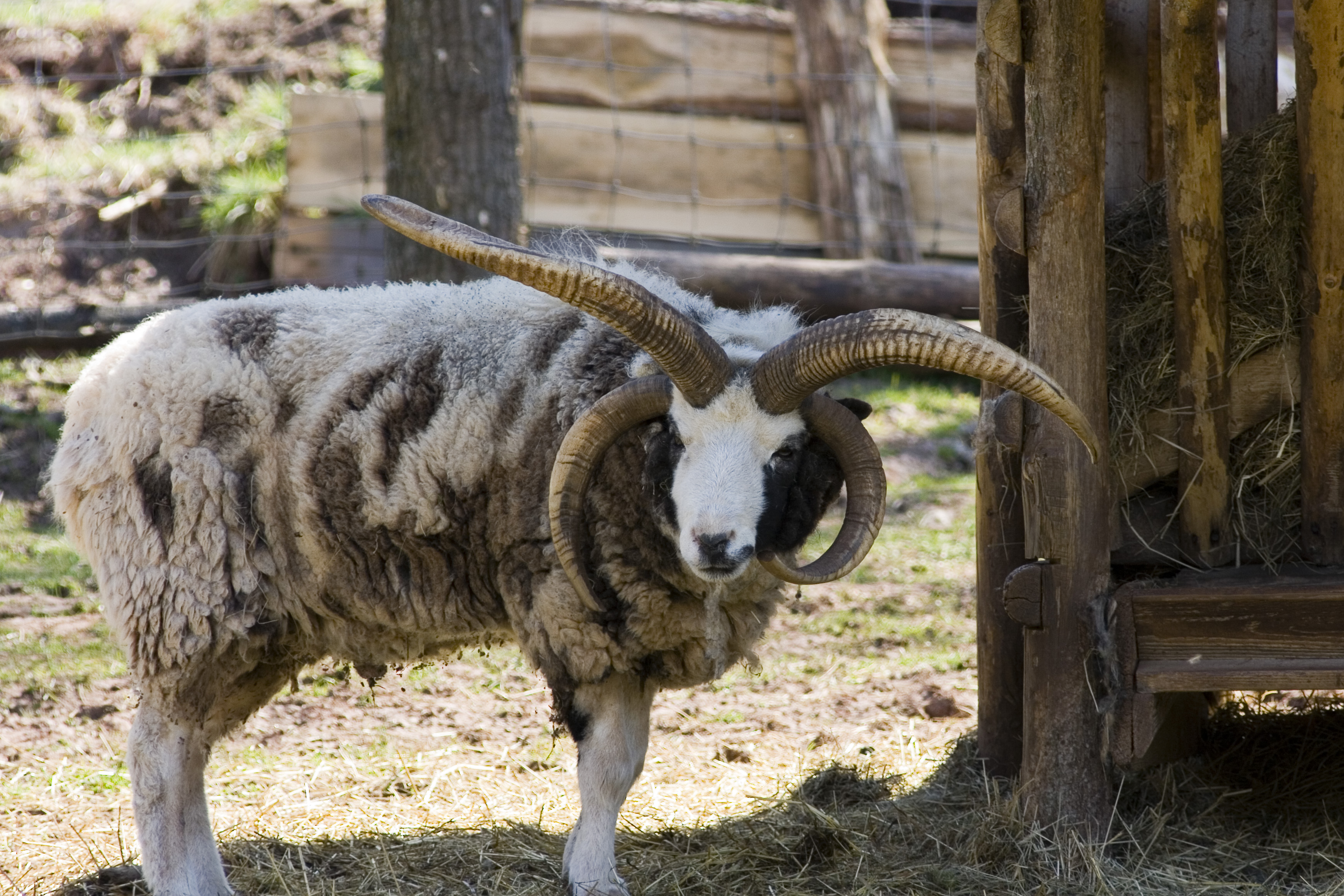
A Jacob sheep with the polycerate condition

Polycerates (meaning "many-horned") are animals with more than two horns.

== Sheep ==
Polyceraty has been observed in ancient sheep remains dating to c. 6000 BCE from Çatalhöyük in modern Turkey.

Polycerate sheep breeds include the Hebridean, Icelandic, Jacob, Manx Loaghtan, Boreray and the Navajo-Churro. One example of a polycerate Shetland sheep was a ram kept by US President Thomas Jefferson for several years in the early 19th century in front of the White House. In the spring of 1808 this ram attacked several people who had taken shortcuts across the square, injuring some and actually killing a small boy. Because of selective breeding, polycerate sheep are increasingly rare in the British Isles and Spain, but some breeds can still be found in Asia. One example is the black-faced sheep of Tibet.

== Goats ==
In Europe, there have been incidents of polycerate goats (having as many as eight horns), although this is a genetic rarity caused by a dominant homeotic gene known as the HOXD1. recent studies have discussed the possibility of the gene being lethal in pure form (two copies of the gene) as all goats researched with the gene only had one copy. For the most part these polycerate goats have only survived in small numbers within alpine herds.

Overall, polycerate goats are quite rare with an estimated 70-100 of these goats known to exist in Austria in the form of the breed known as the Vierhornziege (four-horned goat), and very few individuals found outside of Austria. An example of this can been seen in the breed known as the "Capra quattro corna di Sondrio" (four-horned goat of Sondrio) that is now considered functionally extinct. The four-horned goat of Sondrio were primarily located in Sondrio, Lombardy, Italy, but used to be found in much of the Italian Alps. A more recent example of what little remains of the Sondrio Polycerate goats can be been in the goats that were brought to a show back in 2014. The outcrossed offspring are bred for strong horn cores and good horn conformation as most polycerate goats suffer from small size and smaller skulls causing the goats to have weak brittle horn cores. This is unfortunately why many pure polycerate goats have broken horns. Polycerate goats have been dying out primarily because of breeders shifting to high production dairy breeds where the horns are most typically removed in commercial dairy goat herds, to reduce the injuries to humans and other goats. Although the numbers are low, there is a growing group of farmers dedicated to the preservation of these polycerate goats. These goats commonly debated as to whether they're a true breed of simply a polycerate landrace, as there is no herd book or proper breed standard, but many coat colors are recognized by the breeder association dedicated to the preservation which include Swiss, Chamois colored, and Piebald.

== Wildlife ==
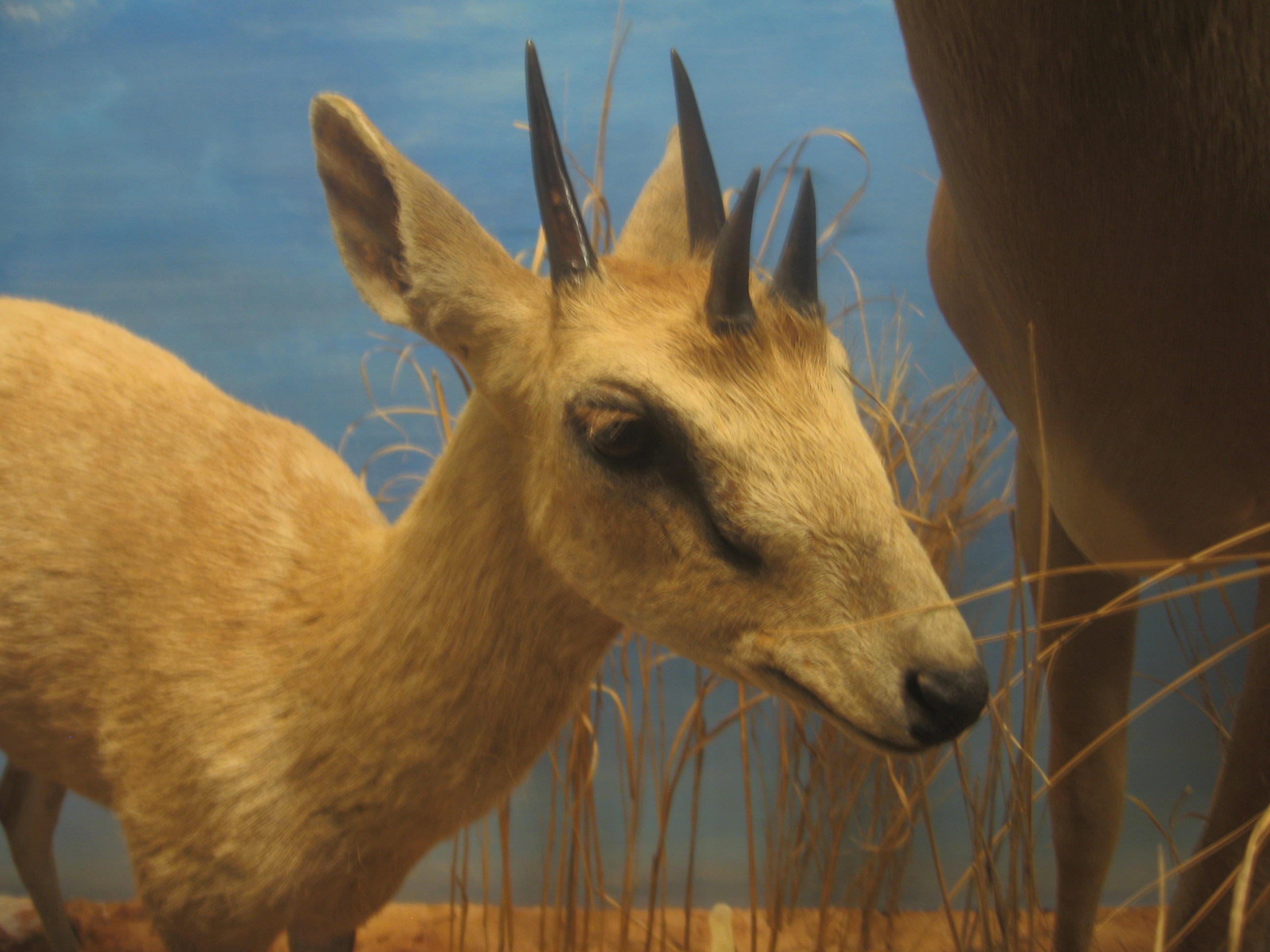
Preserved four-horned antelope

The four-horned antelope (Tetracerus quadricornis) of India and Nepal is unique among antelopes in having four horns: a longer pair of straight, spike-like horns between the ears and a shorter pair on the forehead.

Other Antelopes can also have polycerate individuals, for example, the blue wildebeest (Connochaetes taurinus). Both sexes normally possess one pair of large curved horns.

== Mythology ==
Cerastes, a legendary Greek horned serpent, is sometimes described with two horns or with four small ones.
