= Jacob sheep =

British breed of domestic sheep

Jacob
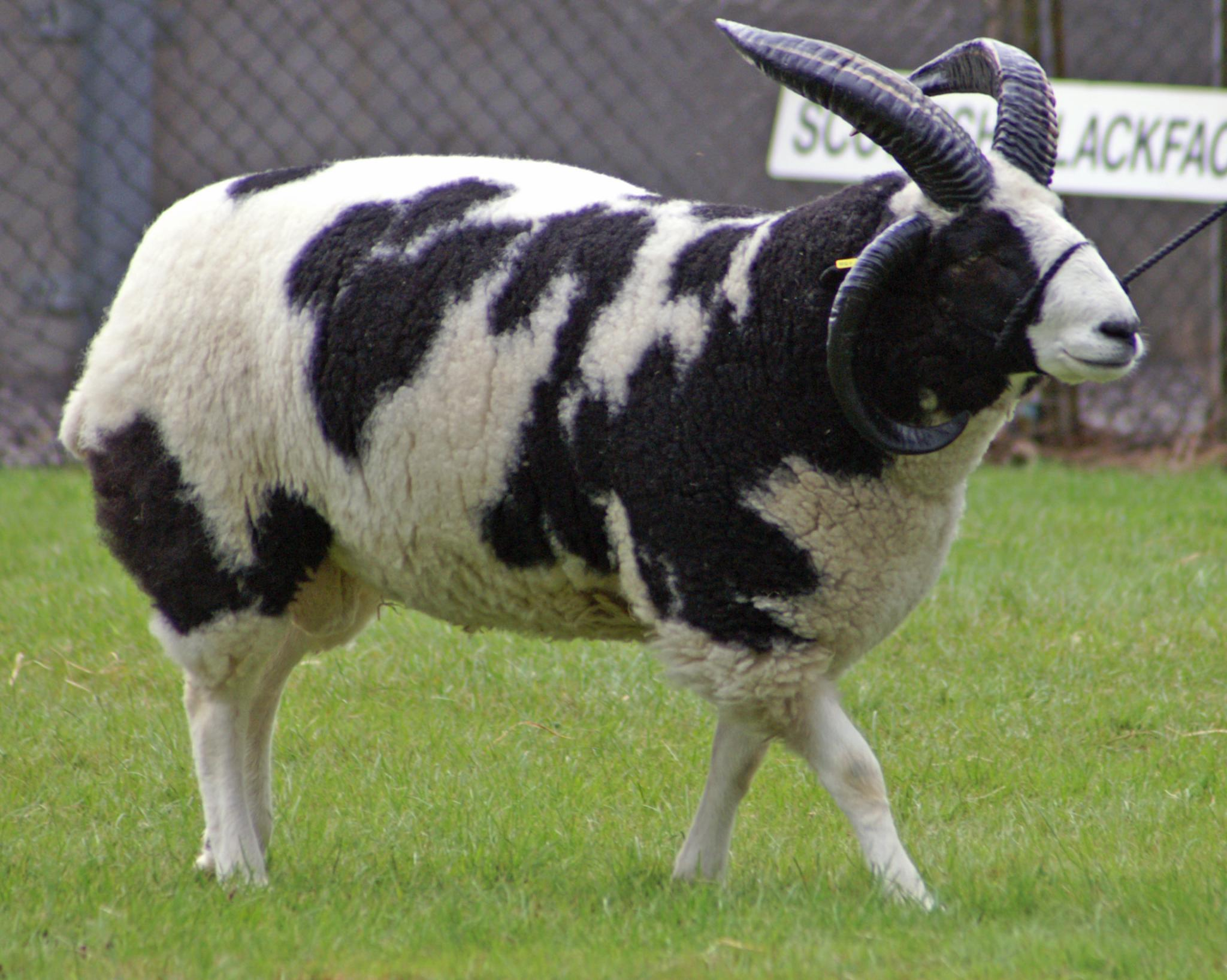
- Ram at the Royal Show at Stoneleigh Park, Warwickshire

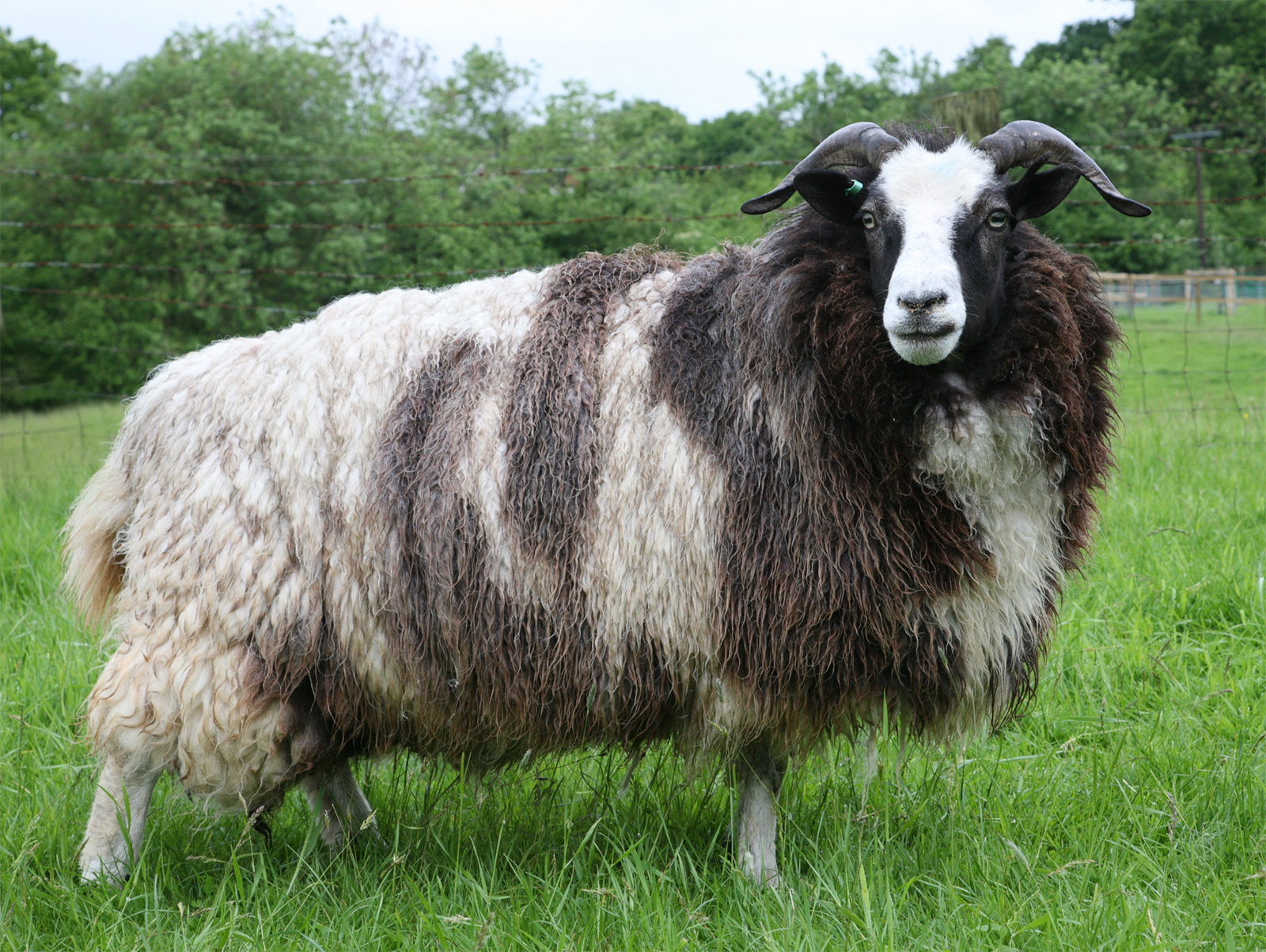
- Ewe in full fleece
- Conservation status: FAO (2007): not at risk; RBST (2017): Category 6; DAD-IS (2026): at risk/vulnerable
- Other names: Spanish Sheep
- Country of origin: United Kingdom
- Standard: Jacob Sheep Society

Traits
- Weight: Male: 80 to 100 kg (180 to 220 lb); Female: 60 to 65 kg (132 to 143 lb)
- Wool colour: piebald – black or grey with white patches
- Face colour: badger-faced – black cheeks and muzzle, white blaze
- Horn status: horned in both sexes; may have two or four horns

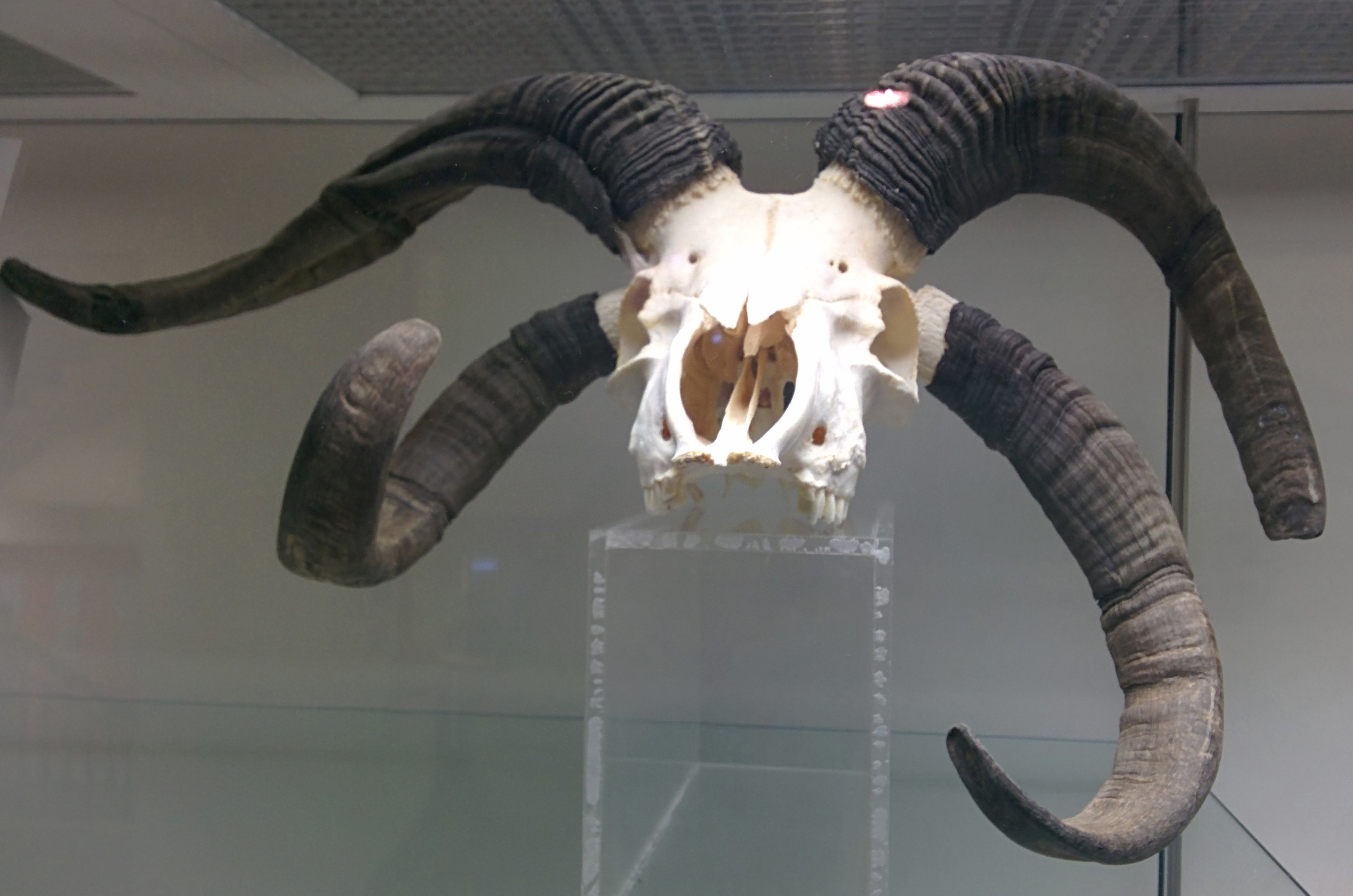
Skull in the anatomy museum of the Royal Veterinary College in London

The Jacob is a British breed of domestic sheep. It combines two characteristics unusual in sheep: it is piebald – dark-coloured with areas of white wool – and it most commonly has four horns. The origin of the breed is not known; broken-coloured polycerate sheep were present in England by the middle of the seventeenth century, and were widespread a century later. A breed society was formed in 1969, and a flock book was published from 1972.

The Jacob was kept for centuries as a "park sheep", to ornament the large estates of landowners. In modern times it is reared mainly for wool, meat and skins.

== History ==
The origins of the Jacob are not known. It has been bred in the British Isles for several hundred years. Sheep of this kind, little different from the modern breed, were shown in paintings from about 1760 at Tabley House in Cheshire, and – by George Stubbs – at Wentworth Woodhouse in Yorkshire.

In the de Tabley family, the tradition was that the piebald sheep had come ashore in Ireland from a wrecked ship of the Spanish Armada in 1588, and been brought to England by Sir John Byrne on his marriage.

Among the many accounts of ancient breeds of piebald sheep is the story of Jacob from the Book of Genesis (Genesis 30:31–43). Jacob took every speckled and spotted sheep from his father-in-law's (Laban's) flock and bred them. Due to the resemblance to the animal described in Genesis, the Jacob sheep was named for the Biblical figure of Jacob sometime in the twentieth century.

In 2009, a study which used endogenous retrovirus markers to investigate the history of sheep domestication found the Jacob to be more closely linked to sheep from Africa and South-west Asia than to other British breeds, though all domestic breeds can be traced back to an origin in the Fertile Crescent.

Some believe that the modern breed is actually the same one mentioned in the Bible (although there is little genetic evidence) having accompanied the westward expansion of human civilisation through Northern Africa, Sicily, Spain and eventually England. Elisha Gootwine, a sheep expert at the Israeli Agriculture Ministry, says that the resemblance of a British breed to the Bible story is a coincidence, that the breed was not indigenous to ancient Israel, and that "Jacob Sheep are related to Jacob the same as the American Indians are related to India".

The Jacob was referred to as the "Spanish sheep" for much of its early recorded history. It has been bred in England for at least 350 years, and spotted sheep were widespread in England by the mid–eighteenth century. The British landed gentry used Jacob as ornamental sheep on their estates and kept importing the sheep which probably kept the breed extant.

A breed society, the Jacob Sheep Society, was formed in July 1969. Mary Cavendish, dowager Duchess of Devonshire, who had a flock of Jacob sheep at Chatsworth House in Derbyshire, was the first president of the society. From 1972 onwards, the society published a flock book.

Jacobs were first exported to North America in the early twentieth century. Some individuals acquired them from zoos in the 1960s and 1970s, but the breed remained rare in America until the 1980s; registration began in 1985. The first North American association for the breed, the Jacob Sheep Breeders Association, was established in 1988. The Jacob was introduced to Israel in 2016, when a small flock of about 120 head was shipped there from Canada by a couple who believed the breed is the same one mentioned in Genesis.

=== Conservation status ===
In 2012 the total Jacob population in the UK was reported to the DAD-IS database of the FAO as 5638, of which 2349 were registered breeding ewes. In 2017, the Rare Breeds Survival Trust listed the Jacob in Category 6 ("Other UK Native Breeds") of its watchlist, in which categories 1–5 are for various degrees of conservation risk, and category 6 is for breeds which have more than 3000 breeding females registered in the herd-book. Small numbers of Jacobs are reported from four other countries: the Czech Republic, Germany, the Netherlands and the United States, with conservation status in those countries ranging from critical to endangered-maintained.

== Characteristics ==
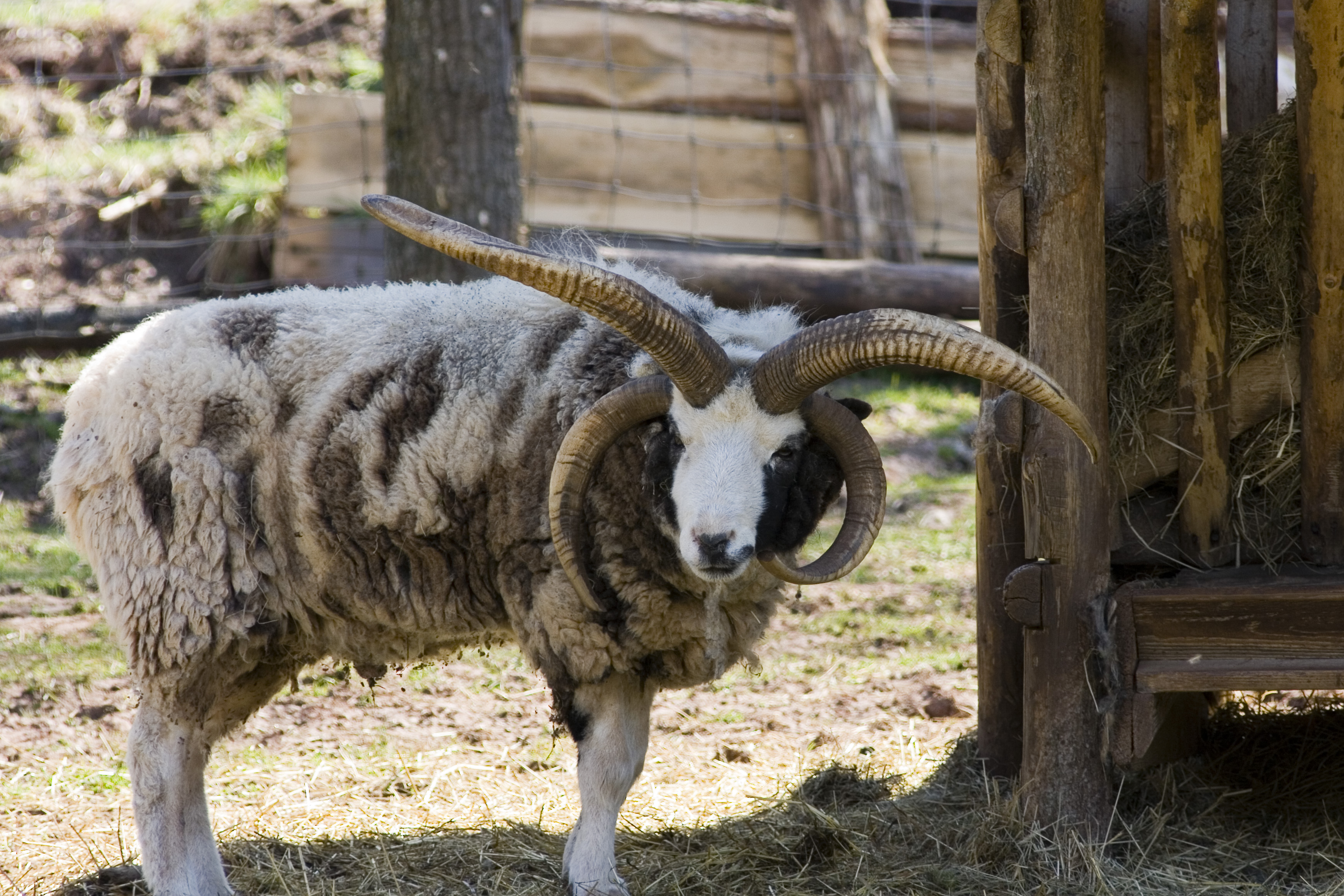
In the Wildpark Tambach in Weitramsdorf, in Coburg, Bavaria

The Jacob is a medium- to large-sized sheep; body weights are usually in the range 60–65 kg for ewes and 80–100 kg for rams. Weights in the United States are considerably lower, approximately 40–50 kg for ewes and 55–80 kg for rams.

It displays two characteristics unusual in sheep: it is piebald – dark-coloured with areas of white wool – and is commonly polycerate. Unlike other European breeds that may be polycerate (such as the Hebridean or the Manx Loaghtan), broken-coloured (such as the Finnsheep or the Shetland) or both (such as the Icelandic), it does not form part of the Northern European short-tailed group of breeds. It does not have the short fluke-shaped tail typical of those breeds, but is long-tailed.

The body frame is long, with a straight back and a rump that slopes toward the base of the tail. The rams have short scrotums free of wool which hold the testicles closer to the body than those of modern breeds, while the ewes have small udders free of wool that are also held closer to the body than those of modern breeds. The head is slender and triangular, and clear of wool forward of the horns and on the cheeks. The tail is long and woolly, extending almost to the hock if it has not been docked. Jacob owners do not usually dock the tail completely, even for market sheep, but instead leave several inches (several centimetres) to cover the anus and vulva. The legs are medium-length, slender, free of wool below the knees, and preferably white with or without coloured patches. The hooves are black or striped. It is not unusual for Jacobs to be cow-hocked. They provide a lean carcass with little external fat, with a high yield of meat compared to more improved breeds.

=== Horns ===
The most distinguishing features of the Jacob are their four horns, although they may have as few as two or as many as six. Both sexes are always horned, and the rams tend to have larger and more impressive horns. Two-horned rams typically have horizontal double-curled horns. Four-horned rams have two vertical centre horns which may be 61 cm (2 ft) or more in length, and two smaller side horns, which grow down along the sides of the head. The horns on the ewe are smaller in diameter, shorter in length and appear more delicate than those of the ram. British Jacobs most often have two horns, while American Jacobs are more often polycerate. Polled (hornless) sheep are not registrable, since this trait is considered an indication of past cross-breeding, and as such there is no such thing as a polled purebred Jacob.

The horns are normally black, but may be black and white striped; white horns are undesirable. Ideally, horns are smooth and balanced, strongly attached to the skull, and grow in a way that does not impede the animal's sight or grazing abilities. Rams have larger horns than ewes. The horns in two-horned sheep, and the lower horns in four-horned animals, grow in a spiral shape. The rostral set of horns usually extend upwards and outwards, while the caudal set of horns curls downwards along the side of the head and neck. On polycerate animals it is preferred that there is a fleshy gap between the two pairs of horns. Partial or deformed horns that are not firmly attached to the skull, often referred to as "scurs", are not unusual but are considered undesirable.

=== Markings ===
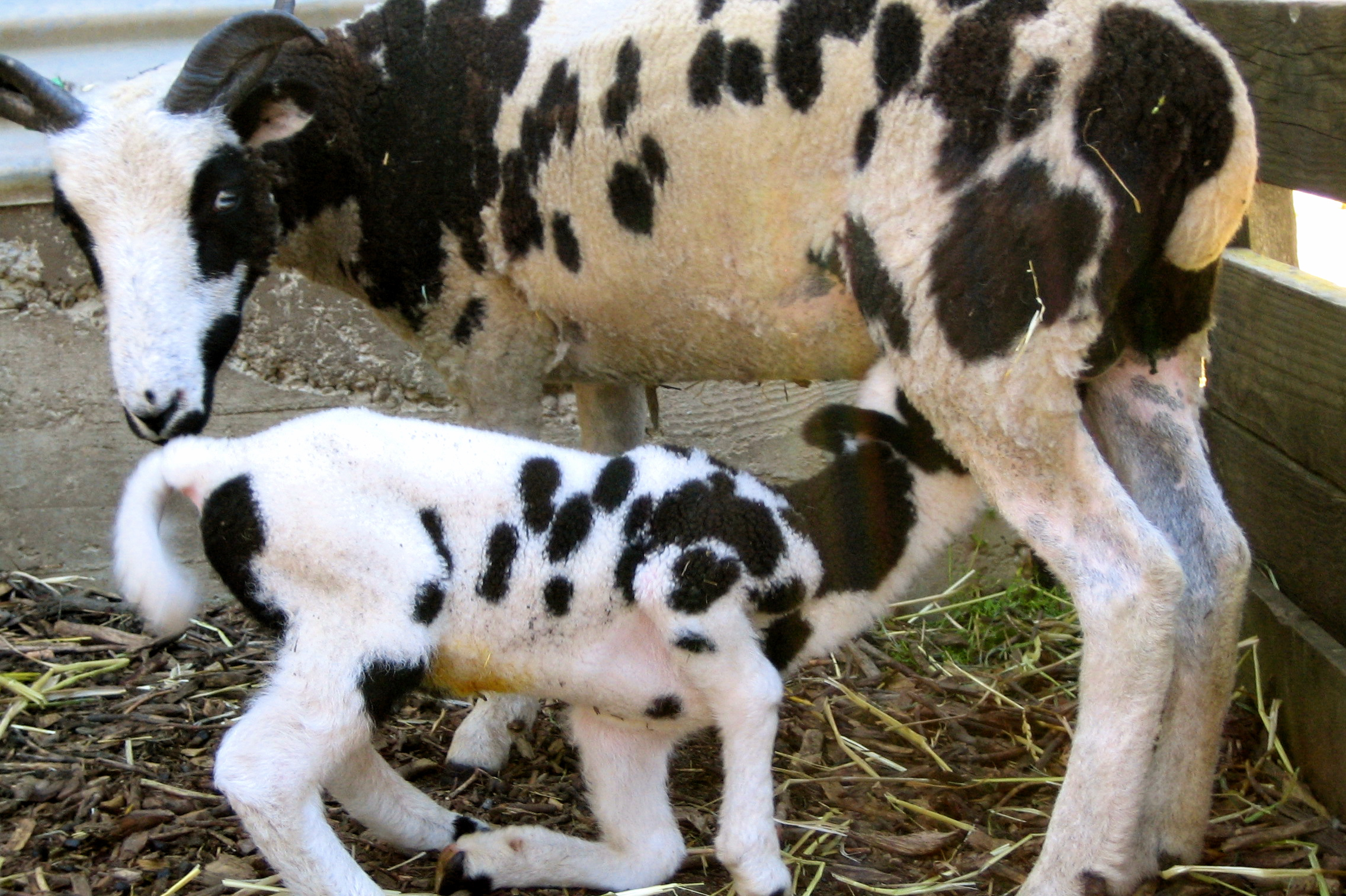
Ewe suckling her lamb

Each Jacob has distinctive markings that enable the shepherd to identify specific sheep from a distance. Desirable colour traits include an animal which is approximately 60% white, with the remaining 40% consisting of a random pattern of black or "lilac" (brownish-gray) spots or patches. The skin beneath the white fleece is pink, while skin beneath coloured spots is darkly pigmented. Both rams and ewes exhibit black markings, some of which are breed specific and some of which are random.

Breed specific markings include large, symmetrical dark patches incorporating the ears, eyes and cheeks, and a dark cape over the dorsal part of the neck and shoulders. The face should have a white blaze extending from the poll to the muzzle. The muzzle itself should be dark. The classic Jacob face is often referred to as "badger-faced", consisting of black cheeks and muzzle with a white blaze running down the front of the face. In addition to these markings, random spots may occur on the rest of the body and legs (including the carpi, hocks, and pasterns). Certain markings are common in particular lines: large muzzle markings, lack of leg markings, lack of muzzle markings, etc.

The lilac color is caused by a recessive variant of the MLPH gene.

=== Diseases ===
Several rare or unusual diseases have been identified in Jacob sheep.

The condition known as split eyelid is a congenital defect common to several polycerate British breeds, and is genetically linked to the multi-horned trait. In mild cases, the eyelid shows a "peak" but does not impair vision or cause discomfort. Extreme cases (Grade 3 or higher) result in a complete separation of the upper eyelid in the middle.

In 1994, an unusual form of asymmetric occipital condylar dysplasia was found in two Jacob lambs; a possible link to the multi-horn trait has been suggested.

In 2008, researchers in Texas identified the hexosaminidase A deficiency known in humans as Tay–Sachs disease in four Jacob lambs. Subsequent testing found some fifty carriers of the genetic defect among Jacobs in the United States. The discovery offers hope of a possible pathway to effective treatment in humans. In 2022, two babies diagnosed with the disease were treated with gene therapy developed from this research and further follow up studies are being conducted.

== Husbandry ==
The Jacob is generally considered to be an "unimproved" or "heirloom" breed (one that has survived with little human selection). Such breeds have been left to mate amongst themselves, often for centuries, and therefore retain much of their original wildness and physical characteristics. American breeders have not subjected Jacobs to extensive cross-breeding or selective breeding, other than for fleece characteristics. Like other unimproved breeds, significant variability is present among individuals within a flock. In contrast, the British Jacob has been selected for greater productivity of meat, and therefore tends to be larger, heavier and have a more uniform appearance. As a result, the American Jacob has retained nearly all of the original phenotypic characteristics of its Old World ancestors while its British counterpart has lost many of its unimproved physical characteristics through cross-breeding and selective breeding. The British Jacob has thus diverged from the American Jacob as a result of artificial selection.

Jacobs are typically hardy, low-maintenance animals with a naturally high resistance to parasites and hoof problems. Jacobs do not show much flocking behaviour. They can be skittish if not used to people, although with daily handling they will become tame and make good pets. They require shelter from extreme temperatures, but the shelter can be open and simple. They tend to thrive in extremes of heat and cold and have good or excellent foraging capabilities. They can secure adequate nutrition with minimal to no supplementation, even in the presence of suboptimal soil conditions.

Due to their low tail dock and generally unimproved anatomy, Jacob ewes are widely reputed to be easy-lambing. Jacobs are seasonal breeders, with ewes generally cycling in the cooler months of the autumn. They will begin to cycle during the first autumn following their birth and most often the ewe's first lamb is a single. Subsequent gestations will typically bear one or two lambs in the spring, and triplets are not unusual. The lambs will exhibit their spotting and horn characteristics at birth, with the horn buds more readily apparent on ram lambs. Lambs may be weaned at two months of age, but many shepherds do not separate lambs and allow the ewe to wean the lamb at about 4 months of age. Jacob ewes are instinctively attentive mothers and are protective of their lambs. They are included in commercial flocks in England because of their ease of lambing and strong mothering instincts.

== Use ==
=== Wool and skins ===
Jacobs are shorn once a year, most often in the spring. The average weight of the fleece is 2–2.5 kg (4–6 lb). The wool is medium to coarse: staple length is about 8–15 cm (3–6 in) and fibre diameter about 32–34 microns (Bradford count 48s–56s).

In general, the fleece is light, soft, springy and open, with little lanolin (grease); there may be some kemp. In some sheep (particularly British Jacobs, which have denser fleeces), the black wool grows longer or shorter than the white wool. This is called "quilted fleece", and is an undesirable trait.

While other British and Northern European multi-horned sheep have a fine inner coat and a coarse, longer outer coat, Jacobs have a medium-grade fleece and no outer coat. Lambs of the more primitive lines are born with a coat of guard hair that is protective against rain and cold; this birth coat is shed at 3–6 months.

Some individual sheep may develop a natural "break", or marked thinning, of the fleece in springtime, which can lead to a natural shedding of the fleece, particularly around the neck and shoulders. The medium-fine-grade wool has a high lustre, and is highly sought after by handspinners. The colours may be separated or blended after shearing and before spinning to produce various shades of yarn from a single fleece, from nearly white to nearly black. Tanned Jacob sheepskins also command high market prices.
